= Peter Cowie =

Film historian and author

- Born: 24 December 1939 (age 86); England
- Education: Magdalene College, Cambridge
- Occupation: Film historian

Peter Cowie (born 24 December 1939) is a British film historian and author of more than thirty books on film. In 1963 he was the founder/publisher and general editor of the annual International Film Guide, a survey of worldwide film production, which he continued to edit for forty years.

== Life and career ==
Educated at Charterhouse School, and an exhibitioner in history at Magdalene College, Cambridge, he began writing about film in 1960. He has contributed to many of the world's leading newspapers and periodicals, including The New York Times, The Wall Street Journal, The Sunday Times (London), the Los Angeles Times, Le Monde, Expressen, Neue Zürcher Zeitung, Sight and Sound, Variety and Film Comment.

His books include definitive surveys of the Scandinavian cinema, in particular the work of Swedish film director Ingmar Bergman. In fact, Cowie himself has said that he belongs to a generation whose life was changed by seeing The Seventh Seal.

In 1963 he published the first edition of International Film Guide which he continued to publish annually for 40 years. During the period 1963–1988, he published almost 100 books on film by various authors at The Tantivy Press in London, including classics like Robin Wood's Hitchcock's Films. He also launched annual publications on sport (International Cycling Guide, International Running Guide), classical music (International Music Guide), television (International TV and Video Guide) and the Nordic area (The Scandinavian Guide).

Other aspects of his work in the area of Scandinavian cinema include his service on the "Quality Awards" Jury of the Swedish Film Institute for 11 years from the 1970s where he was its only non-Nordic member. In 1989 he was decorated by King Carl XVI Gustaf of Sweden with the Royal Order of the Polar Star for his services to Swedish culture. During the 1980s he spent several years in Finland, and since 1983 was the director of the Nordic Film Festival in Hanasaari, Helsinki. Cowie has been on various juries, at the Cannes, Venice, Berlin, and Tampere festivals.

In November 1988, Variety acquired the International Film Guide and other related annuals and Cowie became their European manager from January 1989. He later served as their international publishing director until 2000. After the acquisition, International Film Guide was published as Variety International Film Guide until 2006. In 1999, he edited The Variety Insider with detailed information on the year in entertainment as well as historical information.

He is also interested in the work of American film directors as different as Francis Ford Coppola, Orson Welles, and John Ford. The Godfather Book (Faber, London, 1997) examined Coppola's trilogy of films, and after a visit to Monument Valley in Utah, he wrote an analysis of Ford's films which were shot there, John Ford and the American West (Abrams, New York, 2004), examining the importance of the location and the influences of 19th Century American painting.

He has provided more than a dozen voice-over audio commentaries for DVD versions of classic films which form part of The Criterion Collection. Many of these commentaries are for the films of Bergman. In 2018 he served as Consultant on Criterion's 39-film box-set entitled Ingmar Bergman's Cinema.

He is a sometime visiting professor in film studies at the University of California, Santa Barbara. Between 2003 and 2020 he was a special consultant to the Berlin International Film Festival, working with Berlinale Talents. He has moderated panels and symposia at the Venice International Film Festival, and also on behalf of the European Film Academy. In 2016, he moderated on-stage conversations with Sir Alan Parker, Jaco van Dermal, and Michael Roskam for the MEDIA Program's 25th anniversary celebrations in Brussels.

From 2004 to 2006, he was a member of the executive board at The European Film College in Ebeltoft, Denmark. In November 2006, to coincide with the centenary of the actress Louise Brooks, Cowie's Louise Brooks: Lulu Forever was published in Germany and the United States. In 2008, Cowie co-edited Projections: The European Film Academy (Faber, London), and was a contributing editor to the Taschen volume, The Ingmar Bergman Archives. His most recent work includes Joan Crawford, the Enduring Star (Rizzoli, New York 2009), and Akira Kurosawa, Master of Cinema (Rizzoli, New York, 2010). Also in 2010, he wrote a concise history of the Berlin International Film Festival (published by Bertz und Fischer, Berlin).

In 2017, Cowie was a producer of the Criterion Collection's largest-ever boxed set of DVDs/Blu-rays -- "100 Years of Olympic Films 1912-2012", and contributed a book-length study of the more than fifty documentaries on the Olympics. In the same year he acquired Swiss citizenship.

Cowie published his memoirs, under the title “Flashbacks, A Passion for Cinema” in 2025 (Sticking Place Books, New York).

== Selected publications ==
- Cowie, Peter, Ingmar Bergman: A Critical Biography, New York: Scribers, 1982
- Cowie, Peter, The Godfather Book, London: Faber and Faber, 1997
- Cowie, Peter, The Apocalypse Now Book, New York: Da Capo Press, 2001
- Cowie, Peter, John Ford and the American West, Harry Abrams Inc., New York, 2004 ISBN 0-8109-4976-8
- Cowie, Peter, Revolution: The Explosion of World Cinema in the Sixties, New York: Faber and Faber, 2004
- Cowie, Peter, Louise Brooks: Lulu Forever, New York: Rizzoli, 2006
- Cowie, Peter, Akira Kurosawa: Master of Cinema, New York, Rizzoli, 2010
- Cowie, Peter, The Godfather: The Official Motion Picture Archives, 2012
- Cowie, Peter, Happy 75°: A Brief Introduction to the History of the International Film Festival [of Venice], Venezia: La Biennale di Venezia, 2018
- Cowie, Peter, Japanese Cinema. A Personal Journey, Berkeley CA, Stone Bridge Press, 2022
- Cowie, Peter, God and the Devil, The Life and Work of Ingmar Bergman, London, Faber and Faber, 2023

== Audio commentaries ==
Cowie has provided audio commentaries for the following films in The Criterion Collection:

- Autumn Sonata
- Casque d'or
- Diary of a Country Priest
- Fanny and Alexander
- Grand Illusion
- Hiroshima mon amour
- The Leopard
- The Magician
- Salvatore Giuliano
- Sawdust and Tinsel
- The Seventh Seal
- Tokyo Olympiad
- Wild Strawberries
- Winter Light
- Z
