= Foreign Harbour =

1948 film

Främmande hamn
- Film poster
- Directed by: Hampe Faustman
- Written by: Herbert Grevenius
- Based on: Okänd svensk soldat by Josef Kjellgren
- Starring: Adolf Jahr; George Fant; Fritiof Billquist
- Cinematography: Carl-Erik Edlund
- Edited by: Lennart Wallén
- Music by: Carl-Olof Anderberg
- Production company: Sandrews
- Distributed by: Sandrew-Baumanfilm
- Release date: 2 October 1948
- Running time: 85 minutes
- Country: Sweden
- Language: Swedish

Foreign Harbour (Swedish: Främmande hamn) is a 1948 Swedish drama film directed by Hampe Faustman and starring Adolf Jahr, George Fant and Fritiof Billquist. It was entered into the 1949 Cannes Film Festival. It was shot at the Centrumateljéerna Studios in Stockholm and on location in Värtahamnen and Turku in Finland. The film's sets were designed by the art director P.A. Lundgren. The film is based on Josef Kjellgren's 1938 play Okänd svensk soldat (Unknown Swedish Soldier).

== Cast ==
- Adolf Jahr as Captain Greger
- George Fant as Håkan Eriksson
- Illona Wieselmann as Mimi
- Fritiof Billquist as First Mate
- Åke Fridell as Steward
- Stig Järrel as Man wearing fur
- Gösta Holmström as Second Mate
- Carl Ström as Engine-man
- Anders Börje as Christian
- Stig Johanson as Jerker
- Jan Molander as Shipping Company Official
- Bengt Sundmark as Second Engine Officer Møen
- Georg Skarstedt as Strandmark
- Nils Hallberg as Boiler Stoker
- Josua Bengtson as 'Masthugget'
- Anders Andelius as Gutten
- Ivar Wahlgren as Boiler Stoker
- Sten Sture Modéen as Sailor
- Sten Larsson as Drunk Sailor
- Gösta Holmström as Second Mate
- Henake Schubak as Toivo
- Alexander von Baumgarten as Dirty Dick
- Emanuel Warhaftig as Polish Police Officer
- Elsa Meiring as Old Polish Lady
- Janina Appelqvist as Singing Girl at Dick's Bar
- Per-Axel Arosenius as Waiter
- Birger Lensander as Cook
- Gita Gordeladze as Dancer

== Bibliography ==
- Sundholm, John. Historical Dictionary of Scandinavian Cinema. Scarecrow Press, 2012.
