= Åke Fridell =

Swedish actor

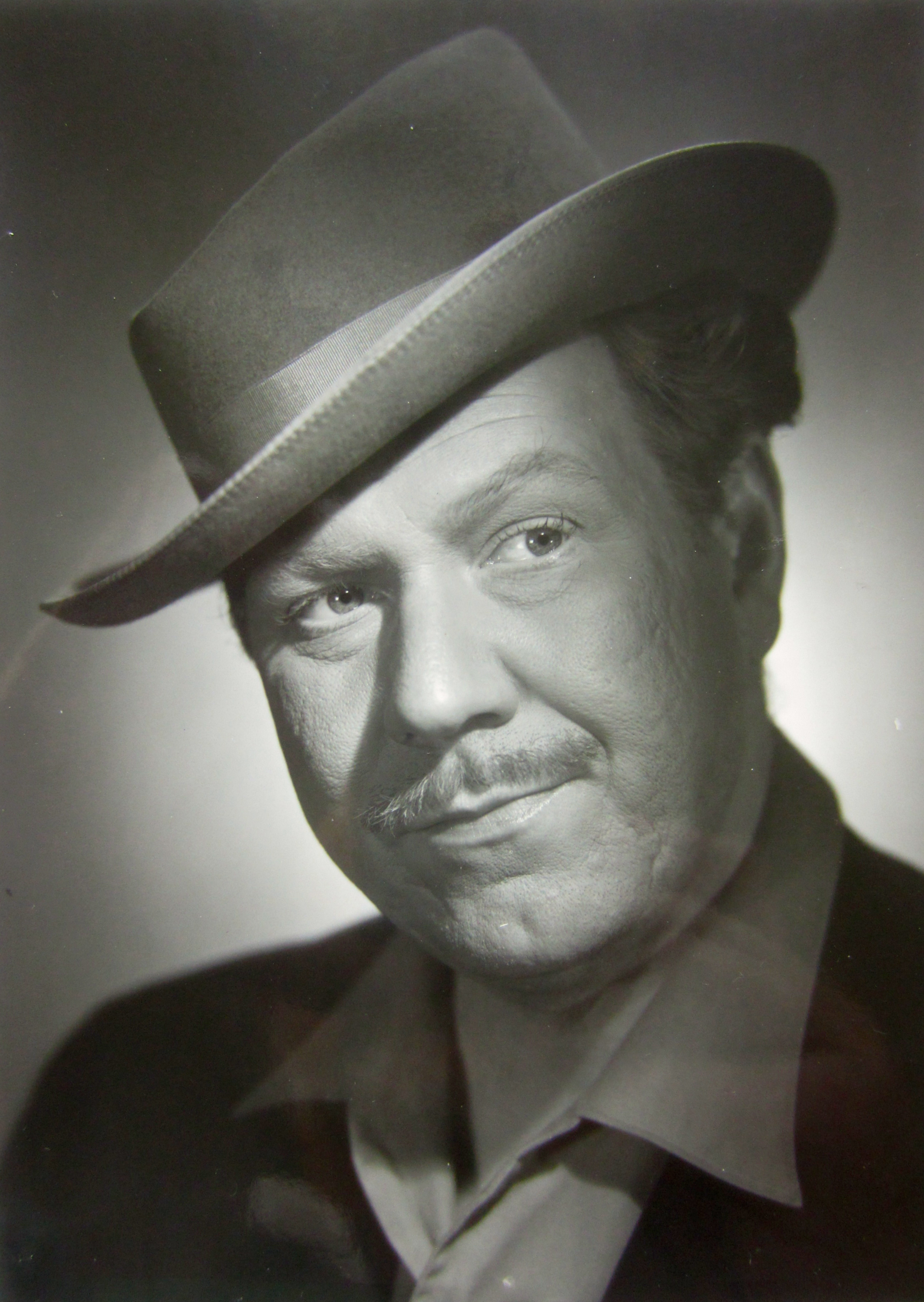
- Born: 23 June 1919; Gävle, Sweden
- Died: 26 August 1985 (aged 66); Stockholm, Sweden
- Occupation: Actor
- Years active: 1944–1975
- Spouse: Maja Stina Nystedt (m. 1951–1959)
- Children: 1

Åke Fridell (23 June 1919 – 26 August 1985) was a Swedish film actor. He was born in Gävle, Sweden and died in Stockholm.

== Selected filmography ==
- The Old Clock at Ronneberga (1944) - Legal clerk at the mayor's party
- Flickan och djävulen (1944) - Young Man at the Harvest Celebration (uncredited)
- We Need Each Other (1944) - Secretary
- It Rains on Our Love (1946) - Reverend
- When the Meadows Blossom (1946) - Emil Nicklasson
- Iris and the Lieutenant (1946) - Officer (uncredited)
- Onda ögon (1947) - Sven
- Soldier's Reminder (1947) - Åkesson
- A Ship to India (1947) - Variety hall owner
- I Am with You (1948) - Carlsson
- Lars Hård (1948) - Sadistic Prison Guard
- Robinson in Roslagen (1948) - Constable (uncredited)
- Främmande hamn (1948) - Steward
- Vagabond Blacksmiths (1949) - Jernberg
- The Street (1949) - Gustaf Persson
- Prison (1949) - Man at the Boarding-house (uncredited)
- Kvinnan som försvann (1949) - Lövdahl
- Sjösalavår (1949) - Karl Oscar
- Only a Mother (1949) - Inspector
- Stora Hoparegränd och himmelriket (1949) - Bister
- Number 17 (1949) - Brandt
- Two Stories Up (1950) - Caretaker
- Restaurant Intim (1950) - Restaurant guest (uncredited)
- Jack of Hearts (1950) - Berra
- When Love Came to the Village (1950) - Johan
- Regementets ros (1950) - Officer Knislund
- Miss Julie (1951) - Robert
- A Ghost on Holiday (1951) - Bovén, agronomist
- Dårskapens hus (1951) - Ordförande i Föreningen för Fornfilmsforskning
- Stronger Than the Law (1951) - Mattias
- In Lilac Time (1952) - Doctor
- Farlig kurva (1952) - Sternberg
- Summer with Monika (1953) - Ludwig Eriksson, Monikas far
- Ursula, the Girl from the Finnish Forests (1953) - Kåre Flatten
- Barabbas (1953) - Eliahu, Robber, Barabbas' Father
- Sawdust and Tinsel (1953) - Artillery Officer (uncredited)
- Luffaren och Rasmus (1955) - Policeman
- Smiles of a Summer Night (1955) - Frid the Groom
- Night Child (1956) - Eva's Father
- The Biscuit (1956) - Filip Schöling
- The Seventh Seal (1957) - Blacksmith Plog
- A Dreamer's Journey (1957) - Terje
- Amor i telefonen (1957) - Direktør Svensson
- Wild Strawberries (1957) - Karin's lover
- A Goat in the Garden (1958) - David Jespersson
- Rabies (1958, TV Movie) - Sixten Garberg
- The Magician (1958) - Tubal
- A Lion in Town (1959) - Circus Director
- Av hjärtans lust (1960) - Sjöberg
- Kärlekens decimaler (1960) - Edgar Temmelin
- Pärlemor (1961) - Marcus Wæbel
- Chans (1962) - Uncle
- Nils Holgerssons underbara resa (1962) - Dog on Leash (voice)
- Mordvapen till salu (1963) - Rovan
- Svenska bilder (1964) - Industrialist Kronvall
- Drömpojken (1964) - Pettersson
- Pang i bygget (1965) - Teobald Grym
- Träfracken (1966) - Bertil Durell
- Here Is Your Life (1966) - Nicke Larsson
- Komedi i Hägerskog (1968) - Gunnarsson
- Mej och dej (1969) - Customs Officer
- Kameleonterna (1969) - Superintendent
- Kyrkoherden (1970) - Mr. Paular
- The Emigrants (1971) - Aron på Nybacken
- Dagmars Heta Trosor (1971)
- Sängkamrater (1974) - Ollie / Paul's father
- Garaget (1975) - Nancy's father
