= Soldier's Reminder =

1947 film

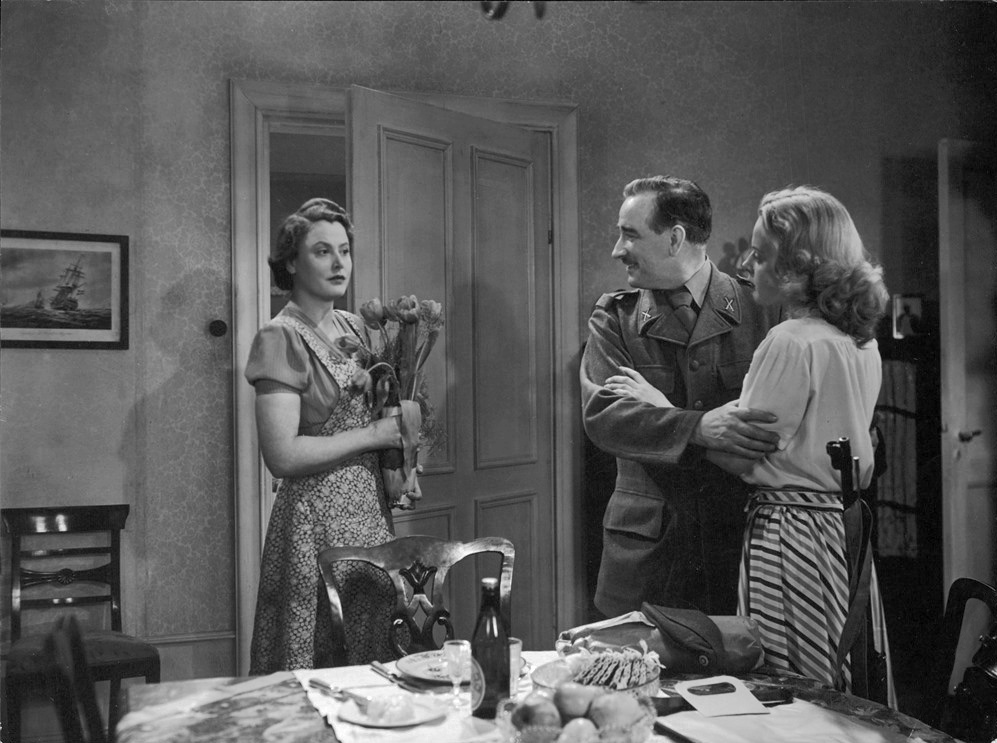
- Birgit Tengroth, Elof Ahrle and Harriett Philipson in a scene from the film.
- Directed by: Hampe Faustman
- Written by: Herbert Grevenius (play); Hampe Faustman
- Produced by: Harald Molander
- Starring: Elof Ahrle; Birgit Tengroth; Gunnar Björnstrand
- Cinematography: Gunnar Fischer
- Edited by: Oscar Rosander
- Music by: Jules Sylvain
- Production company: Svensk Filmindustri
- Distributed by: Svensk Filmindustri
- Release date: 15 August 1947
- Running time: 84 minutes
- Country: Sweden
- Language: Swedish

Soldier's Reminder (Swedish: Krigsmans erinran) is a 1947 Swedish drama film directed by Hampe Faustman and starring Elof Ahrle, Birgit Tengroth and Gunnar Björnstrand. It was shot at the Råsunda Studios in Stockholm. The film's sets were designed by the art director Arne Åkermark.

== Cast ==
- Elof Ahrle as Jocke Svensson
- Birgit Tengroth as Sickan
- Gunnar Björnstrand as Sgt. Löfgren
- Harriett Philipson as Eva
- Bengt Eklund as Vaterson
- Sven-Eric Gamble as Svenne
- Naemi Briese as Margit Andersson
- Ulf Palme as Jerker
- Artur Rolén as Manager
- Josua Bengtson as Lundin
- Åke Fridell as Åkesson
- David Erikson as Persson
- Lillie Wästfeldt as Mrs. Persson
- Rune Stylander as Policeman
- Ivar Kåge as Vicar
- Torsten Bergström as Major

== Bibliography ==
- Qvist, Per Olov & von Bagh, Peter. Guide to the Cinema of Sweden and Finland. Greenwood Publishing Group, 2000.
