= Sonja (film) =

1943 film

- Directed by: Hampe Faustman
- Written by: Herbert Grevenius (play); Gösta Stevens; Hampe Faustman
- Produced by: Lorens Marmstedt
- Starring: Birgit Tengroth; Åke Grönberg; Sture Lagerwall
- Cinematography: Hilding Bladh
- Edited by: Lennart Wallén
- Music by: Carl-Olof Anderberg; Kai Gullmar
- Production company: Terrafilm
- Distributed by: Terrafilm
- Release date: 5 November 1943
- Running time: 79 minutes
- Country: Sweden
- Language: Swedish

Sonja is a 1943 mystery drama film directed by Hampe Faustman and starring Birgit Tengroth, Åke Grönberg and Sture Lagerwall. It was shot at the Centrumateljéerna Studios in Stockholm. The film's sets were designed by the art director Harald Garmland.

== Cast ==
- Birgit Tengroth as Sonja Larsson
- Åke Grönberg as Kurt Larsson
- Sture Lagerwall as Nick Berggren
- Elsie Albiin as Maj Larsson
- David Erikson as Kalle Lindgren
- Bengt Ekerot as Bengt
- Gunn Wållgren as Sonja's Room-mate
- Barbro Fleege as Inga
- Lotten Olsson as Berta Lindgren

== Bibliography ==
- Sundholm, John . Historical Dictionary of Scandinavian Cinema. Scarecrow Press, 2012.
