= U-Boat 39 =

1952 film

- Directed by: Hampe Faustman
- Written by: Herbert Grevenius
- Based on: U-Boat 39 by Rudolf Värnlund
- Produced by: Rune Waldekranz
- Starring: Eva Dahlbeck; Karl-Arne Holmsten; Gunnel Broström
- Cinematography: Curt Jonsson
- Edited by: Lennart Wallén
- Music by: Carl-Olof Anderberg
- Production company: Sandrews
- Distributed by: Sandrew-Baumanfilm
- Release date: 25 August 1952
- Running time: 85 minutes
- Country: Sweden
- Language: Swedish

U-Boat 39 (Swedish: Ubåt 39) is a 1952 Swedish drama film directed by Hampe Faustman and starring Eva Dahlbeck, Karl-Arne Holmsten and Gunnel Broström. It is part of the subgenre of Submarine films. It was based on the play of the same title by Rudolf Värnlund

== Synopsis ==
A submarine of the Swedish Navy is involved in an accident and marooned at the bottom of the sea, while on land the crew's relatives anxiously awaits news about their wellbeing.

== Cast ==
- Eva Dahlbeck as Maria Friberg
- Karl-Arne Holmsten as Herman Friberg
- Gunnel Broström as Anna
- Erik Strandmark as John Nilsson
- Lars Ekborg as Gunnar Friberg
- Harriet Andersson as Harriet, Gunnar's Girlfriend
- Lennart Lindberg as Captain Sundström
- Erik Hell as First Mate
- Olle Florin as Managing director
- Erik Molin as Berg
- Gunnar Hellström as Harriet's Escort
- Tord Stål as Reverend
- Sven-Axel Carlsson as Crew member Malmberg
- Axel Högel as Church warden
- Ove Tjernberg as Crew member
- Bibi Andersson as Girl on the train
- Märta Arbin as Relative
- Gösta Gustafson as Relative
- Svea Holst as Relative
- Frithiof Bjärne as Navy officer
- Bengt Blomgren as Navy officer
- Gösta Krantz as Officer
- Eric Laurent as Navy commander
- Ivar Wahlgren as Clerk

== Bibliography ==
- Qvist, Per Olov & von Bagh, Peter. Guide to the Cinema of Sweden and Finland. Greenwood Publishing Group, 2000.
