= Thirst (1949 film) =

1949 film by Ingmar Bergman

- Swedish cover
- Directed by: Ingmar Bergman
- Screenplay by: Herbert Grevenius
- Based on: Thirst by Birgit Tengroth
- Produced by: Helge Hagerman
- Starring: Eva Henning; Birger Malmsten; Birgit Tengroth
- Cinematography: Gunnar Fischer
- Edited by: Oscar Rosander
- Production company: Svensk Filmindustri
- Release date: 17 October 1949 (Sweden)
- Running time: 83 minutes
- Country: Sweden
- Languages: Swedish; German

Thirst (Swedish: Törst) is a 1949 Swedish drama film directed by Ingmar Bergman. It was released as Three Strange Loves in the United Kingdom.

== Plot ==
Rut and her husband Bertil travel home by train after a holiday in Italy. Their marriage is unhappy due to Rut's changing moods and heavy drinking. While passing through the ruins of post-war Germany, Rut recalls an earlier affair with married military officer Raoul. Raoul forced her to abort their child, which resulted in complications, mainly Rut's infertility and her inability to continue her career as a dancer. Her friend and co-dancer Valborg, disgusted by men, turned to other women.

Bertil too is haunted by an earlier affair, with widow Viola. While Rut and Bertil travel home, the film shows Viola's escape from a sadistic psychiatrist, her encounter with Valborg, who openly tries to seduce her, and her final suicide.

Meanwhile, tension between Rut and Bertil escalates, and Bertil seemingly kills Rut after a fight. Bertil awakens and realises that he imagined Rut's death. The couple decide to give their marriage another chance.

== Cast ==
- Eva Henning as Rut
- Birger Malmsten as Bertil
- Birgit Tengroth as Viola
- Hasse Ekman as Dr. Rosengren
- Mimi Nelson as Valborg
- Bengt Eklund as Raoul
- Gaby Stenberg as Astrid
- Naima Wifstrand as Miss Henriksson
- Verner Arpe as German ticket collector
- Calle Flygare as Priest
- Sven-Eric Gamble as Glass worker
- Helge Hagerman as Priest
- Else-Merete Heiberg as Norwegian lady
- Estrid Hesse as Patient
- Gunnar Nielsen as Assistant doctor
- Sif Ruud as Widow

== Production ==
After the financial failure of Prison, the collaboration between Terrafilm and Bergman had ended. Svensk Filmindustri offered Bergman to produce his next film. Thirst was based on a short story collection published by Birgit Tengroth in 1948; Herbert Grevenius, who had already worked with Bergman on It Rains on Our Love, wrote the screenplay. Bergman asked Tengroth to star in his film, who helped him in finding the right tone in the lesbian scene between Viola and Valborg. Shooting took place between 15 March and 5 July 1949. Thirst premiered on 17 October 1949 in Sweden and on 30 August 1956 in the US.

Finnish Critic Jörn Donner later called Thirst "a commercial version of Prison". François Truffaut saw similarities between Bergman's film and Alfred Hitchcock's Suspicion and Rich and Strange.

== Literature ==
Bergman on Bergman, Touchstone/Simon & Schuster, New York 1973.
