= Gunnar Fischer =

Swedish cinematographer (1910–2011)

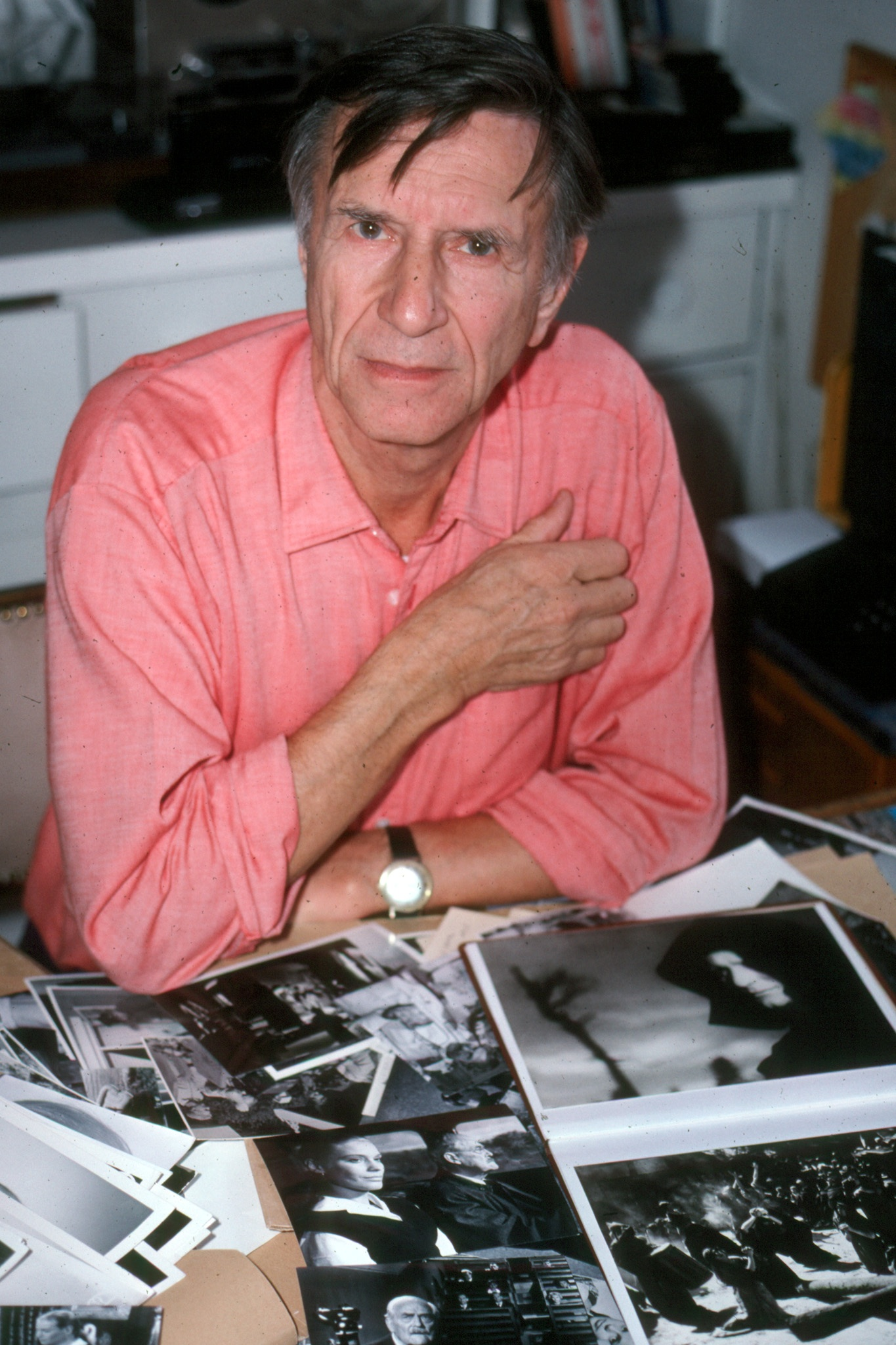
- Gunnar Fischer in 1985.
- Born: 18 November 1910; Ljungby, Sweden
- Died: 11 June 2011 (aged 100); Stockholm, Sweden
- Occupations: Photography director, cinematographer
- Children: Jens Fischer, Peter Fischer

Gunnar Fischer (18 November 1910 – 11 June 2011) was a Swedish cinematographer who worked with director Ingmar Bergman on several of the director's best-known films, including Smiles of a Summer Night (1955) and The Seventh Seal (1957). In addition to his career as a cinematographer, Gunnar Fischer directed short films, wrote screenplays (1933–41) and published books for children.

== Early life ==
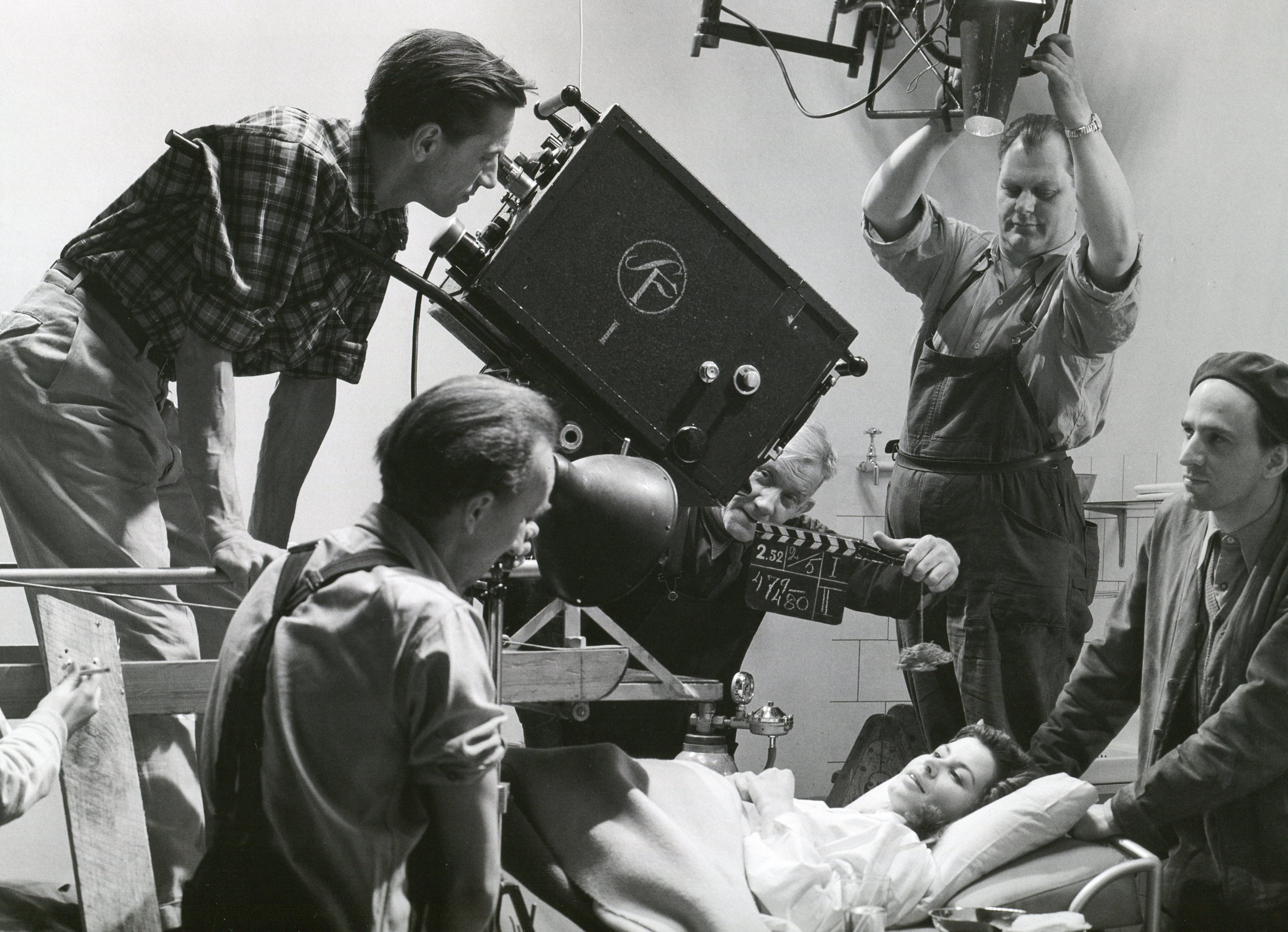
Fischer (behind the camera), Maj-Britt Nilsson (lying down) and Ingmar Bergman (right) on the set of Secrets of Women, 1952.

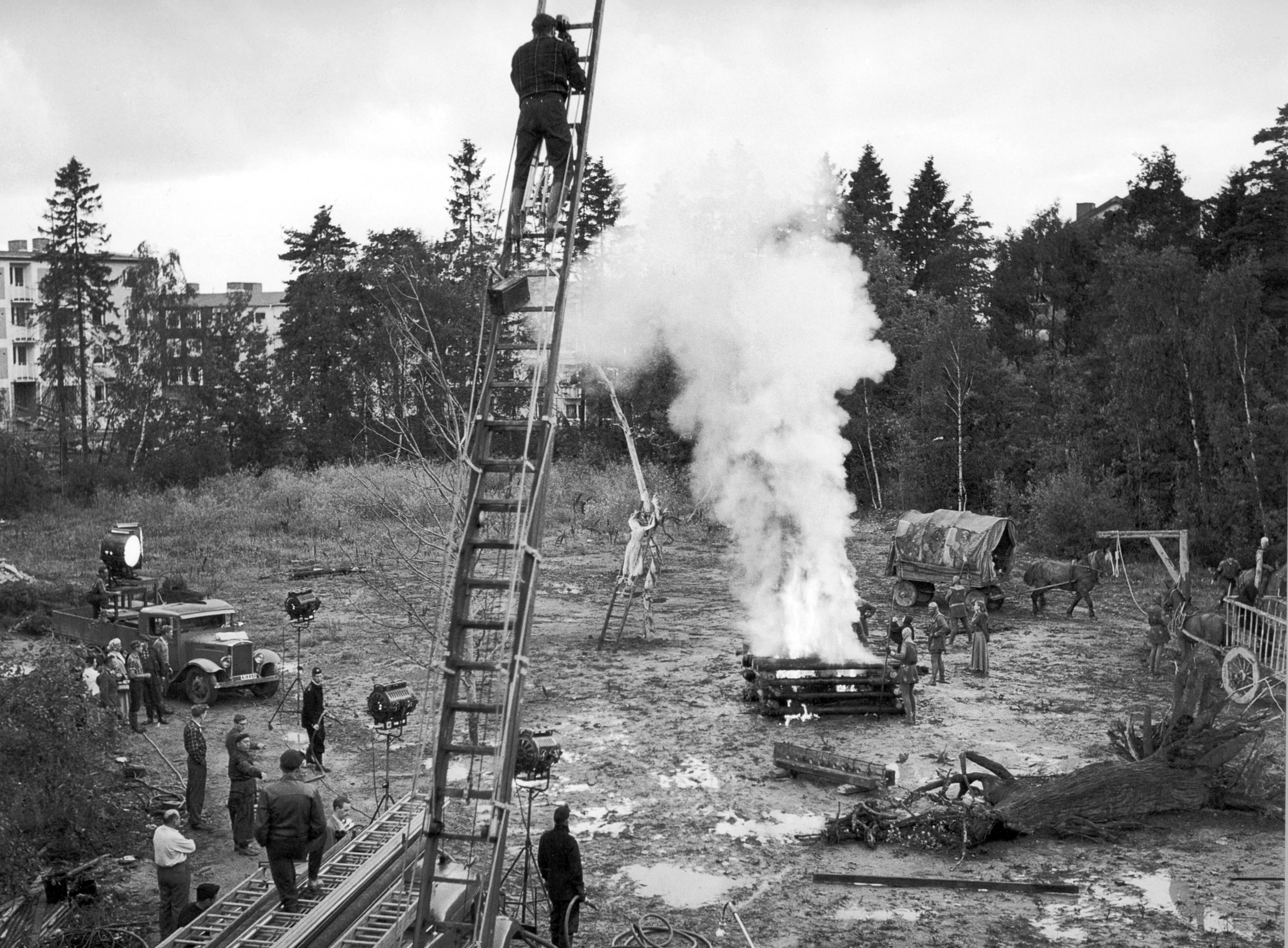
Fischer (at the top of the ladder) on the set of The Seventh Seal, 1957.

Gunnar Fischer was born in Ljungby, Sweden, on 18 November 1910, the son of Gunnar Fischer and Greta Fischer. Greta’s foster father was J. H. Lallerstedt. His paternal grandfather was Elis Fischer, a bank director at Skandia. His family later moved to Ronneby, where Fischer spent most of his childhood. After the death of his father in 1931, the family moved to Stockholm.

== Education ==
Fischer studied painting with Otte Sköld before electing to join the Swedish Navy for 3 years. His passion for film led him to the Svensk Filmindustri in 1935 where he learned cinematography from Victor Sjöström's photographer Julius Jaenzon. Acting as an assistant cameraman for 16 feature films, he made his debut as director of photography in 1942.

== Career ==
Known for his work with directors Bergman and Carl Theodor Dreyer (Two People, 1945), as well as work with Walt Disney, Fischer received an honorary Guldbagge Award for lifetime achievement in 2002, as well as the Ingmar Bergman Award in 1992. His first collaboration with Bergman was on the melodrama Port of Call (1948), a partnership which continued until The Devil's Eye (1960). Fischer has been quoted saying the two men were never each other's "bowing servants" yet his admiration for Bergman stood firm: "I felt privileged collaborating with Bergman."

"Fischer's great skill was in monochrome," according to the British film historian Peter Cowie. "He gave Bergman's films that unique expressionist look, with their brilliant contrasts in every gradation of black and white." His style was drawn from the landscapes of Carl Theodore Dreyer and Victor Sjöström, whom he knew well. The International Dictionary of Films and Filmmakers describes Fischer's style as "in the mainstream of the Scandinavian tradition," and celebrates the close and "intensely psychological close-ups and two-shots."

Widely recognized for his striking imagery and cold lighting, Fischer was the "first cinematographer to capture with unparalleled beauty the cruelty, sensuality and selfishness that often collided in the same scene among Bergman's anguished characters."

Almost as striking was the camerawork for Bergman’s historical feature The Seventh Seal, which depicted a medieval encounter between a knight back from the Crusades and the figure of Death. Told in stark black and white, its most famous scene featured them playing chess together on a bleak Nordic beach. Borrowing a trick from the stage, Fischer lit the shot so that both men were seen in sharp relief against the dark, brooding waves. Pedants insisted that this image was impossible, as it implied the existence of two suns in different quarters of the sky; Fischer dismissed the criticism on the ground that if the very notion of a knight playing chess with Death were accepted, two suns in the sky should be no more incredible.

== Personal life ==
Fischer was married to Gull Söderblom, sister of the popular actor Åke Söderblom. He died on 11 June 2011 at the age of 100. One of his nephews was the financier Tomas Fischer.

== Honours and awards ==
- Guldbagge Honorary Award – 2002

== Filmography ==
=== Biography ===
- Gunnar Fischer: Metamorphosis of Light (2021)

=== Selected cinematography ===
- Just a Bugler (1938)
- Whalers (1939)
- It Is My Music (1942)
- Night in Port (1943)
- Don't Give Up (1947)
- Soldier's Reminder (1947)
- Private Bom (1948)
- Port of Call (1948)
- Thirst (1949)
- This Can't Happen Here (1950)
- To Joy (1950)
- Beef and the Banana (1951)
- Summer Interlude (1951)
- Skipper in Stormy Weather (1951)
- Secrets of Women (1952)
- Summer with Monika (1953)
- Hidden in the Fog (1953)
- Uncle's (1955)
- Smiles of a Summer Night (1955)
- The Hard Game (1956)
- The Seventh Seal (1957)
- Encounters in the Twilight (1957)
- Wild Strawberries (1957)
- Playing on the Rainbow (1958)
- The Magician (1958)
- The Devil's Eye (1960)
- Siska (1962)

== See also ==
- List of centenarians (actors, filmmakers and entertainers)
