= We Need Each Other (film) =

1944 film

- Directed by: Hampe Faustman
- Written by: Sven Stolpe
- Produced by: Lorens Marmstedt
- Starring: Ludde Gentzel; Ingrid Borthen; Carl Ström
- Cinematography: Hilding Bladh; Göran Strindberg; Sven Thermænius; Elner Åkesson
- Edited by: Lennart Wallén
- Production company: Terrafilm
- Distributed by: Terrafilm
- Release date: 20 September 1944
- Running time: 52 minutes
- Country: Sweden
- Language: Swedish

We Need Each Other (Swedish: Vi behöver varann) is a 1944 Swedish drama film directed by Hampe Faustman and starring Ludde Gentzel, Ingrid Borthen and Carl Ström with location shooting in Stadshagen, Djurgården and the city's Old Town. It was shot at the Centrumateljéerna Studios in Stockholm. The film's sets were designed by the art director P.A. Lundgren. It was produced to celebrate the hundredth year of the foundation of the Cooperative movement by the Rochdale Society of Equitable Pioneers in 1844. In addition to directing, Faustman also acts in this film.

== Cast ==
- Ludde Gentzel as Malm
- Hampe Faustman as Malm's Father
- Ingrid Borthen as Elsa Trotsig
- Carl Ström as Trotsig
- Sture Baude as Squire
- Sven Lindberg as Young Squire
- Harry Ahlin as Handske
- Arne Nyberg as Martin Sundell
- Anders Ek as Svensk Kooperatör hos Phoebus
- Georg Funkquist as Phoebus
- Ingrid Östergren as Secretary
- Siv Thulin as Mary
- Julia Cæsar as Old lady
- Sture Ericson as Blacksmith
- Åke Fridell as Secretary
- Erik Strandmark as Guest at Café
- Gunnel Wadner as Abused Girl
- Birger Malmsten as Guest at Café
- Nils Hallberg as Guest at the Café

== Bibliography ==
- Qvist, Per Olov & von Bagh, Peter. Guide to the Cinema of Sweden and Finland. Greenwood Publishing Group, 2000.
