= Torsten Bergström =

Swedish actor

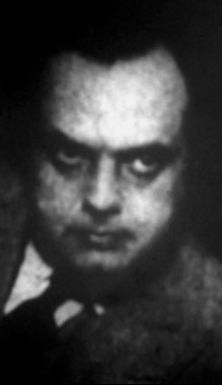
- Born: Torsten Lars Herman Jamte Bergström; 12 October 1896; Ås, Krokom, Jämtland County
- Died: 26 May 1948 (aged 51); Stockholm, Sweden
- Occupation: Actor

Torsten Lars Herman Jamte Bergström (10 December 1896 – 26 May 1948) was a Swedish film director and theater and film actor.

Bergström was born in Ås, Krokom, Jämtland County and attended the Royal Dramatic Training Academy from 1917 to 1919. He made his film debut in 1919 in director Rune Carlsten's Ett farligt frieri (English language: A Dangerous Courtship) and appeared in over 25 films during his career.

Torsten Bergström was the father of director Håkan Bergström. He died in Stockholm, Sweden in 1948, aged 51.

== Selected filmography ==
- Synnöve Solbakken (1919)
- Mother Gets Married (1937)
- The Pale Count (1937)
- A Cruise in the Albertina (1938)
- If I Could Marry the Minister (1941)
- The Talk of the Town (1941)
- Sunshine Follows Rain (1946)
- A Ship Bound for India (1947)
- Maria (1947)
- Life in the Finnish Woods (1947)
- Soldier's Reminder (1947)
- Neglected by His Wife (1947)
- Sin (1948)
- Lars Hård (1948)
