= Birgit Tengroth =

Swedish actress (1915–1983)

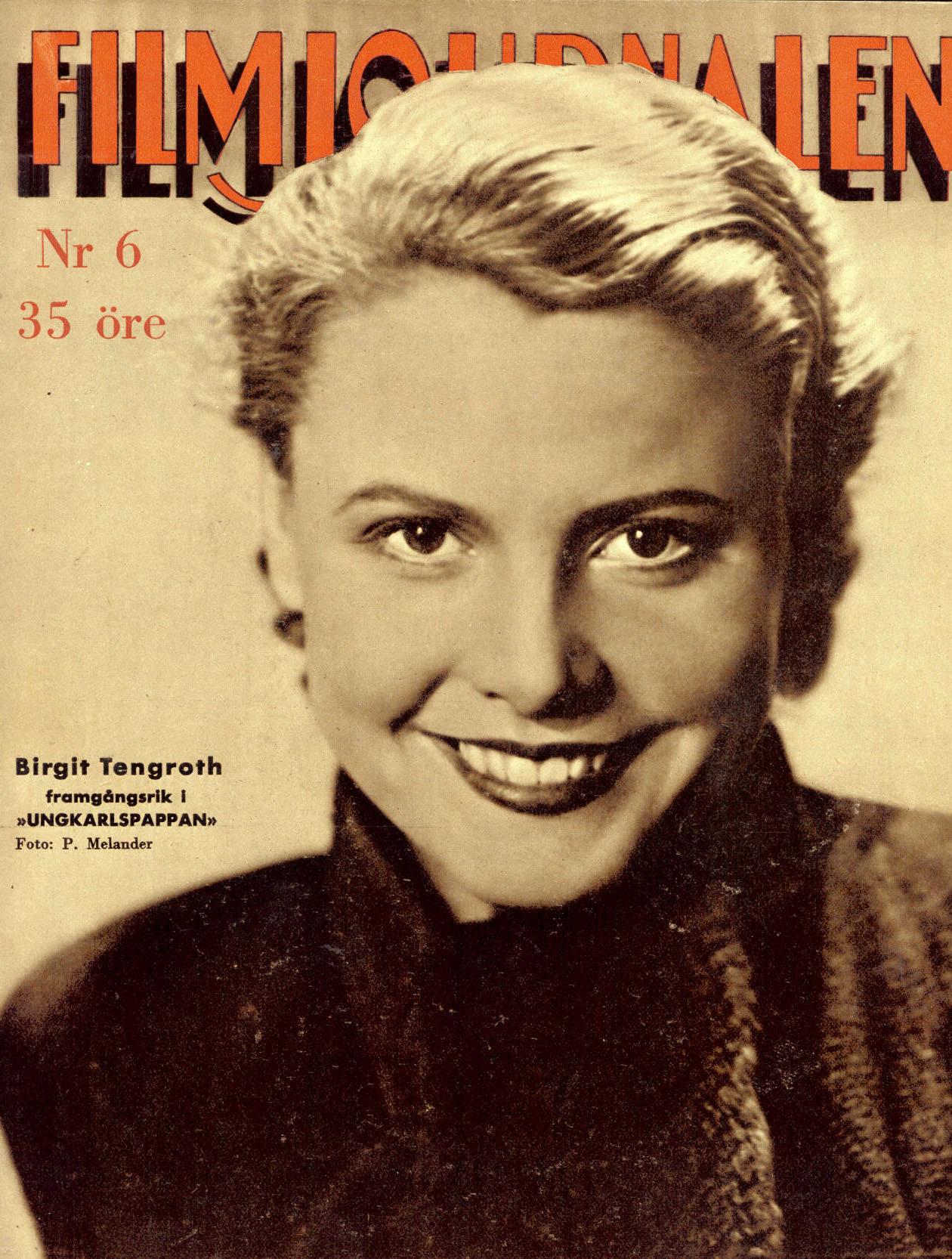
- Born: 13 July 1915; Stockholm, Sweden
- Died: 21 September 1983 (aged 68); Stockholm, Sweden
- Occupation: Actress
- Years active: 1926–1950
- Spouses: Stig Ahlgren (m. 1944; div. 1950); Jens Otto Krag (m. 1950–1952)

Birgit Tengroth (13 July 1915 – 21 September 1983) was a Swedish film actress. She appeared in more than 40 films between 1926 and 1950. She was married briefly to Danish politician Jens Otto Krag in 1950.

== Biography ==
Birgit Tengroth was born in 1915, and was the sixth of eight children born to Carl Gustaf, a chief customs inspector in Stockholm. Her childhood was not happy, the family were poor and Tengroth described herself as often lacking clothing, shoes and tenderness. She took ballet lessons at the Kungliga Teatern (royal theatre) but failed to gain entry to the Royal School of Drama, so did not have formal acting training until private lessons in the 1930s.

Tengroth debuted in Sven Jerring's radio show 'Barnens Brevlåda' together with her friend Sickan Carlsson at the age of 10. Her first work for the movies was a small part in Mordbrännerskan (1926). She got a contract with the leading Swedish studio Svensk Filmindustri (SF) in 1932 and remained there throughout the decade. She was known for playing fresh, girl next door roles, which gave her a popular following amongst young fans. When Ingrid Bergman made her screen debut, she was unfavourably compared to Tengroth.

During the 1940s she left Svensk Filmindustri and worked for a variety of companies. After leaving the movie business in 1950, she became an author and journalist. In some of later writings she was very critical of the Swedish film industry during her years of stardom.

Tengroth married Stig Ahlgren, an author and publicist, and the couple divorced. She then married Danish politician Jens Otto Krag, later Prime Minister, in 1950, only to later resume her relationship with Ahlgren.

Tengroth died in 1983, and is buried next to Ahlgren in the Galärvarv cemetery in Stockholm.

== Selected filmography ==
- The Devil and the Smalander (1927)
- Sin (1928)
- The Storholmen Brothers (1932)
- His Life's Match (1932)
- What Do Men Know? (1933)
- Marriageable Daughters (1933)
- Boman's Boy (1933)
- Man's Way with Women (1934)
- The Atlantic Adventure (1934)
- The Family Secret (1936)
- It Pays to Advertise (1936)
- Johan Ulfstjerna (1936)
- Oh, Such a Night! (1937)
- Dollar (1938)
- Gubben kommer (1939)
- Gläd dig i din ungdom (1939)
- Between Us Barons (1939)
- A Real Man (1940)
- Västkustens hjältar (1940)
- How to Tame a Real Man (1941)
- Rospiggar (1942)
- Night in Port (1943)
- Sonja (1943)
- Katrina (1943)
- Life and Death (1943)
- The Forest Is Our Heritage (1944)
- Man's Woman (1945)
- Dynamite (1947)
- Soldier's Reminder (1947)
- Sin (1948)
- Thirst (1949)
- Girl with Hyacinths (1950)

== Writings ==
- Thirst (Törst), novel
