= Here Is Your Life =

1966 film

- Film poster
- Swedish: ''Här har du ditt liv''
- Directed by: Jan Troell
- Written by: Bengt Forslund; Jan Troell
- Based on: Här har du ditt liv 1935 book by Eyvind Johnson
- Produced by: Bengt Forslund
- Starring: Eddie Axberg
- Cinematography: Jan Troell
- Edited by: Jan Troell
- Music by: Erik Nordgren
- Release date: 26 December 1966 (Sweden)
- Running time: 169 minutes
- Country: Sweden
- Language: Swedish

Here Is Your Life (Swedish: Här har du ditt liv) is a Swedish coming-of-age film directed by Jan Troell. It was released to cinemas in Sweden on 26 December 1966. The film is based on a novel of the same name, the second of Eyvind Johnson's semi-autobiographical series of four novels Romanen om Olof, about a working-class boy growing up in the northern parts of Sweden.

The film was selected as the Swedish entry for the Best Foreign Language Film at the 40th Academy Awards, but was not accepted as a nominee.

== Plot ==
When the father of the young Olof Persson becomes ill, he starts taking jobs as a working class Swede. His first job is log driving, where he meets a man named August. August tells Olof about death, and a flashback tale with August's wife chasing their twin sons, all of whom are now deceased, is played. Olof change jobs. He finds a dead moth while working and picks it up, flying it through the air.

During the funeral of Olof's father, his father's old friend Smålands-Pelle speaks fondly of the old memories of his father, and has a private conversation with Olof afterwards. Olof takes a job at a sawmill. The sawmill workers were sitting around telling stories about women, and then some of the workers harass Olof. Olof primarily works outside of the mill, transporting logs with a boy named Oskar. Oskar gets injured when a log falls on him, and he later dies in the hospital. After this incident, Olof asks for a higher position at the mill, but he is denied. He starts to read a lot of novels and books about philosophy.

Later on, he quits the sawmill job and applies for a job at a cinema selling candy. In the job interview he encounters the eccentric owner, who informs him the duties of job and possible promotion to a projectionist in the future. He becomes interested in a girl named Maria, who he later sees with another boy. He makes friends with a boy named Fredrik. They talk about books and philosophy, and explore together. Olof visits home and his mother asks questions about the security of his new job. After an accident while selling candy, Olof asks for a new job and starts working for a touring projectionist named Mr. Larsson. They travel to participate in the circus. Mr. Larsson introduces Olof to Olivia, the "queen" of a travelling shooting gallery.

Olof stays with a blacksmith's family on a vacation between touring and the cinema. He meets Maja, the blacksmith's daughter; they have sex in the field. Afterward, she cries. Olof starts going to meetings concerning communism and its place working-class Sweden, and writing poetry. When he goes back to the cinema, Olof's boss gets mad that he was handing out "socialist rags". Olof quits. He goes back on tour and works for Olivia. They enter into a relationship and then break up. Olof continues visiting home and going to communist meetings.

Later on, Olof starts working for the railroad company. He works with a man named Niklas, and they have similar opinions about capitalism. Niklas shouts, "Damn capitalist rot!” They both proclaim their pro-socialist opinions to their boss, Byberg. They prank Byberg as well. Olof spares food for hobos on the train, and starts leading communist meetings. At a party, Olof gets very drunk, throws up, and falls down. Back with the circus, Olivia gives Olof a final speech of sorts about giving up and how hard life can be. A scene with a bird flying that was shown at the beginning, with characteristic music, is repeated.

Olof goes back to his foster mother before travelling on. He finally buys a hat he had been admiring earlier in the film. In the final scene, Olof walks along railroad tracks in heavy snow, onto whatever is next.

== Selected cast ==
- Eddie Axberg as Olof Persson
- Allan Edwall as August
- Max von Sydow as Smålands-Pelle
- Gunnar Björnstrand as Lundgren, "Herr Direktör" (proprietor) of a cinema
- Gudrun Brost as Olof's foster mother
- Ulla Akselson as Olof's mother
- Bo Wahlström as Older brother
- Rick Axberg as Second brother
- Holger Löwenadler as Kristiansson
- Göran Lindberg as Olsson
- Tage Sjögren as Lund
- Tage Jonsson as Linus
- Anna Maria Blind as Woman in Tale
- Birger Lensander as Brickworks Intendant
- Ulf Palme as Larsson
- Ulla Sjöblom as Olivia
- Jan Erik Lindqvist as Johansson
- Börje Nyberg as Intendant
- Signe Stade as Maria
- Stig Törnblom as Fredrik
- Åke Fridell as Nicke Larsson
- Catti Edfeldt as Maja
- Per Oscarsson as Niklas
- Bengt Ekerot as Byberg

== Historical context ==
Released in 1966, Here Is Your Life was director Jan Troell's first feature-length film. The main character is growing up in a Sweden that is also developing, in the midst of the early twentieth century. This film, through the lens of 1960s Sweden, tells the story of a boy learning and responding to the environment around him.

Films about large-scale wars, such as World War I, are often produced in differing waves after the war is over. The release of Here's Your Life marked the fiftieth anniversary of the Great War, like many other films of its time. Sweden was looking back and considering its state of neutrality during the war and how this neutrality affected Sweden's people. When reviewing the past effects of neutrality, Sweden was looking to the future and its position in the Cold War.

Like many European countries in the mid-twentieth century, Sweden began to introduce welfare capitalism. Specifically, Sweden found its place in this continental movement by following its "tradition of state intervention to promote political centralization and economic efficiency. In Here Is Your Life, Olof is never struggling for money and shelter, but he is constantly working and taking new jobs to sustain himself and his family. This working class portrayal is likely linked to the welfare initiatives that were present or forthcoming when the film was produced.

Sweden has been a country of neutrality, relying on peaceful interactions with other nations, since the early nineteenth century Sweden has worked to avoid alliances (such as NATO) and imperialism so that it will not be pulled into wars by other countries. Along with this, Sweden's economy during the twentieth century relied on trade, so this was another reason to keep peace with multiple nations. However, "Sweden was particularly active in the resumption of scientific and other cultural cooperation in the world after 1945." During the Cold War, the Swedish government had to carefully consider the need for nuclear weapons ("armed isolation"), and how these would influence Sweden's policy of neutrality and economic situation.

In the early 1960s, the younger generations of Sweden were exposed to Western culture, and many participated in protests opposing the Vietnam War. Because of this, the government became more progressive in order to appease the young leftists and the poor. Olof Palme, an adviser for Prime Minister Tage Erlander and then a prime minister himself, also protested against the Vietnam War. Palme was important to Sweden's activism and "international solidarity" during the 1960s. When Here Is Your Life was released and shortly after, much of Sweden's population was considering Sweden's changing foreign policy that "consisted of four elements: national neutrality, Nordic cooperation, a commitment to UN collective security, and a nascent association with the European Communities and the Conference on Security and Cooperation in Europe." In a New York Times film review in 1968, Here Is Your Life was praised, though many Swedes were protesting U.S. policies during this time.

== Awards ==
It won the Gold and Silver Hugo at the Chicago International Film Festival in 1967 for Best Film and Best Director, as well as the award for Best Director at the 4th Guldbagge Awards. It was also entered into the 17th Berlin International Film Festival, where it won three minor awards (C.A.C.I.E., C.I.D.A.L.C. and Interfilm Awards). The film was selected as the Swedish entry for the Best Foreign Language Film at the 40th Academy Awards, but was not nominated.

== Home video ==
This film was released on Blu-Ray and DVD by the Criterion Collection.

== See also ==
- List of submissions to the 40th Academy Awards for Best Foreign Language Film
- List of Swedish submissions for the Academy Award for Best Foreign Language Film
