= This Can't Happen Here =

1950 film by Ingmar Bergman

- Theatrical release poster
- Directed by: Ingmar Bergman
- Written by: Waldemar Brøgger (novel); Herbert Grevenius
- Produced by: Helge Hagerman
- Starring: Signe Hasso; Ulf Palme; Alf Kjellin
- Cinematography: Gunnar Fischer
- Edited by: Lennart Wallén
- Music by: Erik Nordgren
- Distributed by: Svensk Filmindustri
- Release dates: 4 June 1950 (Denmark); 23 October 1950 (Sweden)
- Running time: 84 minutes
- Country: Sweden
- Language: Swedish

This Can't Happen Here (Swedish: Sånt händer inte här, also released as High Tension in English) is a 1950 Swedish film directed by Ingmar Bergman and produced by Helge Hagerman.

== Cast ==
- Signe Hasso as Vera
- Ulf Palme as Atkä Natas
- Alf Kjellin as Almkvist
- Gösta Cederlund as The Doctor
- Yngve Nordwall as Lindell
- Hanno Kompus as The Priest
- Sylvia Täl as Vanja
- Els Vårman as Refugee
- Edmar Kuus as Leino
- Helena Kuus as Woman at wedding
- Rudolf Lipp as Skuggan
- Sven-Axel Carlsson as Young Man

== Reception ==
This Can't Happen Here is, along with The Touch, one of the Bergman films Bergman personally disliked the most.
