= Port of Call (1948 film) =

1948 film by Ingmar Bergman

- Theatrical release poster
- Directed by: Ingmar Bergman
- Written by: Ingmar Bergman
- Based on: Guldet och murarna by Olle Länsberg
- Produced by: Harald Molander
- Starring: Nine-Christine Jönsson; Bengt Eklund; Mimi Nelson
- Cinematography: Gunnar Fischer
- Edited by: Oscar Rosander
- Music by: Erland von Koch
- Release date: 11 October 1948
- Running time: 100 minutes
- Country: Sweden
- Languages: Swedish; German

Port of Call (Swedish: Hamnstad, lit. 'Port Town'; also known as Harbour City) is a 1948 Swedish drama film written and directed by Ingmar Bergman. This film is strongly influenced by neorealism.

== Plot ==
The film opens when we see Berit, a young woman living in Gothenburg, tries to drown herself by jumping into the sea. Among the witnesses of this incident is Gösta, a sailor newly returned from overseas and intent upon staying on land. By chance they begin a relationship, as the audience realizes Berit's checkered past and the existence of her abusive and cruel mother. The plot and character development centre on the relationship between Berit and Gösta, as she discloses her troubled past of family problems and various affairs to him and he must deal with his own feelings and conflicts about such disclosure. The film ends at a high note with Berit and Gösta decide to stay together and fight for their future.

== Cast ==
- Nine-Christine Jönsson as Berit Irene Holm
- Bengt Eklund as Gösta
- Mimi Nelson as Gertrud
- Berta Hall as Berit's mother
- Birgitta Valberg as Mrs. Vilander
- Sif Ruud as Mrs. Krona
- Britta Billsten as Prostitute
- Harry Ahlin as Skåningen
- Nils Hallberg as Gustav
- Sven-Eric Gamble as Eken
- Yngve Nordwall as The Supervisor
- Nils Dahlgren as Gertrud's father
- Hans Strååt as Mr. Vilander
- Erik Hell as Berit's father
