= David Erikson =

Swedish actor

- Born: Anton Otto David Eriksson; 26 May 1899; Stockholm, Sweden
- Died: 22 June 1973 (aged 74); Stockholm, Sweden
- Occupation: Actor
- Years active: 1921-1957

David Erikson (born Anton Otto David Eriksson; 26 May 1899 – 22 June 1973) was a Swedish stage and film actor. He appeared in more than 70 films between 1938 and 1957.

== Selected filmography ==
- Thunder and Lightning (1938)
- Dollar (1938)
- Styrman Karlssons flammor (1938)
- Kiss Her! (1940)
- The Train Leaves at Nine (1941)
- Lasse-Maja (1941)
- Fransson the Terrible (1941)
- Dunungen (1941)
- Dangerous Ways (1942)
- The Sixth Shot (1943)
- She Thought It Was Him (1943)
- Sonja (1943)
- The Journey Away (1945)
- The Österman Brothers' Virago (1945)
- Kvarterets olycksfågel (1947)
- The People of Simlang Valley (1947)
- Soldier's Reminder (1947)
- Neglected by His Wife (1947)
- Maria (1947)
- Lars Hård (1948)
- Restaurant Intim (1950)
- The Kiss on the Cruise (1950)
- Blondie, Beef and the Banana (1952)
- Dance in the Smoke (1954)
- Simon the Sinner (1954)
- Voyage in the Night (1955)
- Uncle's (1955)
- Night Child (1956)
- A Dreamer's Journey (1957)
