= Lars Hård =

1948 film

- Directed by: Hampe Faustman
- Written by: Jan Fridegård
- Based on: Lars Hård by Jan Fridegård
- Starring: George Fant; Adolf Jahr; Eva Dahlbeck
- Cinematography: Carl-Erik Edlund
- Edited by: Lennart Wallén
- Music by: Erland von Koch
- Production company: Sandrews
- Distributed by: Sandrew-Baumanfilm
- Release date: 30 August 1948
- Running time: 95 minutes
- Country: Sweden
- Language: Swedish

Lars Hård is a 1948 Swedish drama film directed by Hampe Faustman and starring George Fant, Adolf Jahr and Eva Dahlbeck. It was shot at the Centrumateljéerna Studios in Stockholm. The film's sets were designed by the art director P.A. Lundgren.

== Cast ==
- George Fant as Lars Johan Hård
- Adolf Jahr as Lars' Father
- Elsa Widborg as Lars' Mother
- Eva Dahlbeck as Inga
- Ulla Smidje as Maj
- Nine-Christine Jönsson as Eva
- Rut Holm as Coachman's Wife
- Torsten Bergström as The Coachman
- Hugo Björne as Sundvall - Chimney Sweep
- Carl Ström as Friendly Prison Guard
- Hampe Faustman as Prison Reverend
- Tord Bernheim as Guard at Penal Labour Prison
- Sif Ruud as Child Welfare Officer
- Ann Mari Uddenberg as Marta
- Artur Rolén as Andersson
- Gustaf Lövås as Prisoner
- Axel Högel as Older Prisoner
- Josua Bengtson as Åhs - Prisoner
- Arne Källerud as Oskar
- David Erikson as Prisoner
- Sten Lindgren as Prison Port Guard
- Åke Fridell as Sadistic Prison Guard
- Tekla Sjöblom as Old Peasant Woman
- Ivar Wahlgren as Constable
- Lars Ekborg as Peasant Woman's Son
- Nils Ekman as Farm-hand
- Inga Gill as Maid
- Gösta Gustafson as Prisoner
- Gösta Holmström as Lieutenant
- Nils Hultgren as Lawman
- Hugo Jacobsson as Prison Guard
- Stig Johanson as Farm-hand
- Eric Laurent as Police Officer
- Birger Lensander as Released Prisoner
- Wilma Malmlöf as Praying Woman
- John Norrman as Prisoner
- Aurore Palmgren as Old Woman on the Road
- Olav Riégo as Prison Director
- Hanny Schedin s Praying Woman
- Georg Skarstedt as Farm-hand
- Tord Stål as Judge

== Bibliography ==
- Sundholm, John. Historical Dictionary of Scandinavian Cinema. Scarecrow Press, 2012.
