= Night in Port =

1943 film

- Directed by: Hampe Faustman
- Written by: Gunnar Fischer; Lars-Eric Kjellgren; Alf Kjellin
- Starring: Sigurd Wallén; Birgit Tengroth; Alf Kjellin
- Cinematography: Gunnar Fischer
- Edited by: Oscar Rosander
- Music by: Carl-Olof Anderberg
- Production company: Svensk Filmindustri
- Distributed by: Svensk Filmindustri
- Release date: 27 September 1943
- Running time: 73 minutes
- Country: Sweden
- Language: Swedish

Night in Port (Swedish: Natt i hamn) is a 1943 Swedish drama film directed by Hampe Faustman and starring Sigurd Wallén, Birgit Tengroth and Alf Kjellin. It was shot at the Råsunda Studios in Stockholm. The film's sets were designed by the art director Nils Svenwall.

== Cast ==
- Sigurd Wallén as Canada Eriksson
- Birgit Tengroth as Maria
- Alf Kjellin as Arnold
- Sigge Fürst as Biggen
- Holger Löwenadler as Mårten
- Linnéa Hillberg as Jenny Eriksson
- Rune Halvarsson as Jim
- Bengt Ekerot as John
- Gunnar Björnstrand as Sven Eriksson
- Carl Ström as Captain
- Thore Thorén as Kurt
- John Ericsson as Oskar

== Bibliography ==
- Qvist, Per Olov & von Bagh, Peter. Guide to the Cinema of Sweden and Finland. Greenwood Publishing Group, 2000.
- Sundholm, John . Historical Dictionary of Scandinavian Cinema. Scarecrow Press, 2012.
