= Tord Stål =

Swedish actor

- Born: 14 September 1906; Kristianstad, Sweden
- Died: 2 July 1972 (aged 65); Stockholm, Sweden
- Occupation: Actor
- Years active: 1938–1969

Tord Stål (14 September 1906 – 2 July 1972) was a Swedish film actor. He appeared in more than 50 films between 1938 and 1969. He starred in the film Leva på 'Hoppet', which won the Silver Bear (Comedies) award at the 1st Berlin International Film Festival.

== Selected filmography ==
- How to Tame a Real Man (1941)
- Only a Woman (1941)
- Adventurer (1942)
- His Excellency (1944)
- The Girl and the Devil (1944)
- Skipper Jansson (1944)
- Black Roses (1945)
- While the Door Was Locked (1946)
- When the Meadows Blossom (1946)
- Incorrigible (1946)
- Kristin Commands (1946)
- Brita in the Merchant's House (1946)
- Harald the Stalwart (1946)
- How to Love (1947)
- Two Women (1947)
- Lars Hård (1948)
- A Swedish Tiger (1948)
- Vagabond Blacksmiths (1949)
- Bohus Battalion (1949)
- Jack of Hearts (1950)
- Restaurant Intim (1950)
- Living on 'Hope' (1951)
- U-Boat 39 (1952)
- Say It with Flowers (1952)
- The Minister of Uddarbo (1957)
- A Dreamer's Journey (1957)
- Miss April (1958)
