= Sin (1948 film) =

1948 film

- Directed by: Arnold Sjöstrand
- Written by: Boël-Marie Beronius
- Based on: Soldatbrunnen by Aage Dons
- Starring: Birgit Tengroth; Sture Lagerwall; Gunnar Sjöberg
- Cinematography: Hilmer Ekdahl
- Edited by: Eric Nordemar
- Music by: Jules Sylvain
- Production company: Centrumfilm
- Distributed by: Wivefilm
- Release date: 3 December 1948
- Running time: 95 minutes
- Country: Sweden
- Language: Swedish

Sin (Swedish: Synd) is a 1948 Swedish drama film directed by Arnold Sjöstrand and starring Birgit Tengroth, Sture Lagerwall and Gunnar Sjöberg. It was shot at the Centrumateljéerna Studios in Stockholm. The film's sets were designed by the art director Nils Nordemar. It is unrelated to the 1928 silent film of the same title directed by Gustaf Molander.

== Synopsis ==
Fredrik Hermansson seduces Anna and swindles her out of her savings in order to pursue his ambitions. He even goes so far as forging the signature of her wealthy aunt.

== Cast ==
- Birgit Tengroth as Anna
- Sture Lagerwall as Fredrik Hermansson
- Gunnar Sjöberg as Martin Alm
- Stig Järrel as Brust
- Hilda Borgström as Mrs. Alm
- Anne-Margrethe Björlin as Edith Björk
- Anna-Stina Wåglund as Stina
- Gustav Hedberg as A Man
- Georg Skarstedt as Hotel porter
- Torsten Bergström as Priest
- Aurore Palmgren as Hilda, Anna's aunt
- Stig Johanson as Fredrik's friend
- Gunnel Wadner as Fredrik's business colleague
- Olle Hilding as Banker
- Bertil Ehrenmark as Fredrik's business colleague

== Bibliography ==
- Qvist, Per Olov & von Bagh, Peter. Guide to the Cinema of Sweden and Finland. Greenwood Publishing Group, 2000.
