= Erik Nordgren =

- Born: Herman Nordgren; 13 February 1913; Sireköpinge, Malmöhus County, Sweden
- Died: 6 March 1992 (aged 79) Västerhaninge, Sweden
- Genres: Film score
- Occupations: Composer, arranger, bandleader

Herman "Erik" Nordgren (13 February 1913 – 6 March 1992) was a Swedish composer, arranger and bandleader.

== Biography ==
Erik Nordgren was born in Sireköpinge, Malmöhus County, and grew up in the Skåne countryside. In 1941 he graduated from College of Music in Stockholm. As a musician, he played viola . Between 1945 and 1973 he wrote music for more than 60 Swedish films, including 18 of the Ingmar Bergman's most famous films, such as The Seventh Seal, Wild Strawberries, Smiles of a Summer Night, The Virgin Spring, and Jan Troell s Pause in the marshland , Here's Your Life and The Emigrants ; the last film work in 1971. In addition, he collaborated with directors Alf Sjöberg, Hasse Ekman, Gustaf Molander, Alf Kjellin and Lars-Erik Stewart. He was music director at the Swedish Film Industry, 1953–1967, and then 1967–1977 he served as orchestra director at the SR. In addition he wrote three string quartets, chamber symphony (1944), Concerto for clarinet (1950), Concerto for Bassoon (1960) and Music for orchestra. From the 1960s, he composed electronic music, something that was not so well known to most people.

For the music to Wild Strawberries he won a special award from the magazine Folket i Bild, as well as an award of Swedish film community in 1957. He died in Västerhaninge.

== Works ==
- The Emigrants (1971)
- 4x4 (1965)
- All These Women (1964)
- The Dress (1964)
- The Pleasure Garden (1961 film) (1961)
- Two Living, One Dead (1961)
- Through a Glass Darkly (film) (1961)
- On a Bench in a Park (1960)
- The Devil's Eye (1960)
- The Virgin Spring (1960)
- The Magician (1958 film) (1958)
- Jazzgossen (1958)
- Den store amatören (1958)
- Playing on the Rainbow (1958)
- Wild Strawberries (film) (1957)
- The Seventh Seal (1957)
- The Staffan Stolle Story (1956)
- Smiles of a Summer Night (1955)
- Våld (1955)
- Gabrielle (1954)
- The Glass Mountain (1953)
- Ingen mans kvinna (1953)
- Dansa min docka (1953)
- I dimma dold (1953)
- Sommaren med Monika (1953)
- Defiance (1952)
- Frånskild (1951)
- Sommarlek (1951)
- Sånt händer inte här (1950)
- Love Wins Out (1949)
- Törst (1949)
- Eva (1948)
- Kvinna utan ansikte (1947)
- Crime and Punishment (1945)

== Discography ==
- The Bergman Suites, Slovak Radio Symphony Orchestra, Marco Polo, 1996

== Writing ==
- Erik Nordgren and Ingmar Bergman : the music in the film ' Wild Strawberries ' 1957 , bachelor thesis by Sofia Lilly Jönsson, Stockholm University, 2008 ( awarded the Benny s scholarship 2010)
