= Nils Nilsson (art director) =

Swedish art director (1919–1981)

- Born: 1 February 1919; Gnarp, Sweden
- Died: 31 March 1981 (aged 62); Stockholm, Sweden
- Occupation: Art director
- Years active: 1943–1960 (film)

Nils Nilsson (1919–1981) was a Swedish art director. He worked on the design of film sets on over sixty productions, many of them shot at the Centrumateljéerna Studios of Sandrews in Stockholm.

== Selected filmography ==
- Live Dangerously (1944)
- Youth in Danger (1946)
- Dynamite (1947)
- Crime in the Sun (1947)
- The Sixth Commandment (1947)
- Loffe as a Millionaire (1948)
- Sunshine (1948)
- She Came Like the Wind (1952)
- All the World's Delights (1953)
- Stupid Bom (1953)
- House of Women (1953)
- The Yellow Squadron (1954)
- Our Father and the Gypsy (1954)
- Storm over Tjurö (1954)
- Taxi 13(1954)
- People of the Finnish Forests (1955)
- Voyage in the Night (1955)
- Whoops! (1955)
- The Girl in the Rain (1955)
- The Stranger from the Sky (1956)
- The Girl in Tails (1956)
- Laughing in the Sunshine (1956)
- Moon Over Hellesta (1956)
- Stage Entrance (1956)
- Seventeen Years Old (1957)
- A Dreamer's Journey (1957)
- Guest at One's Own Home (1957)
- Mother Takes a Vacation (1957)
- Musik ombord (1958)
- The Koster Waltz (1958)
- Line Six (1958)
- Terror in the Midnight Sun (1959)
- Åsa-Nisse as a Policeman (1960)

== Bibliography ==
- Frank, Alan G. The Science Fiction and Fantasy Film Handbook. Barnes & Noble Books, 1982.
