= Hampe Faustman =

Swedish actor (1919-1961)

- Born: 3 July 1919; Stockholm, Sweden
- Died: 26 August 1961 (aged 42); Sweden
- Occupations: Actor, film director
- Years active: 1940–1961
- Spouse: Gunn Wållgren (m. 1941; div. 1949)

Erik "Hampe" Faustman (born Erik Stellan Chatham; 3 July 1919 – 26 August 1961) was a Swedish actor and film director. He appeared in more than 20 films between 1940 and 1961. He also directed 20 films between 1943 and 1955. He was married to actress Gunn Wållgren 1941–1949.

Faustman's parents were Gösta Chatham and Mollie Faustman, who was an artist, journalist, and author.

== Selected filmography ==
- They Staked Their Lives (1940)
- Woman on Board (1941)
- Ride Tonight! (1942)
- Night in Port (1943)
- Katrina (1943)
- There's a Fire Burning (1943)
- Imprisoned Women (1943)
- Sonja (1943)
- The Invisible Wall (1944)
- His Excellency (1944)
- We Need Each Other (1944)
- The Girl and the Devil (1944)
- My People Are Not Yours (1944)
- Crime and Punishment (1945)
- While the Door Was Locked (1946)
- When the Meadows Blossom (1946)
- Harald the Stalwart (1946)
- Soldier's Reminder (1947)
- Foreign Harbour (1948)
- Lars Hård (1948)
- Vagabond Blacksmiths (1949)
- Restaurant Intim (1950)
- Four Times Love (1951)
- U-Boat 39 (1952)
- She Came Like the Wind (1952)
- House of Women (1953)
- Café Lunchrasten (1954)
- Our Father and the Gypsy (1954)
- Voyage in the Night (1955)
- Never in Your Life (1957)
