= House of Women (1953 film) =

1953 film

- Directed by: Hampe Faustman
- Screenplay by: Ulla Isaksson; Hampe Faustman
- Based on: House of Women; 1952 novel by Ulla Isaksson
- Starring: Inga Tidblad; Eva Dahlbeck; Annalisa Ericson
- Cinematography: Curt Jonsson
- Edited by: Eric Nordemar
- Music by: Carl-Olof Anderberg
- Production company: F-Produktion
- Distributed by: Sandrew-Baumanfilm
- Release date: 31 August 1953
- Running time: 88 minutes
- Country: Sweden
- Language: Swedish

House of Women (Swedish: Kvinnohuset) is a 1953 Swedish drama film directed by Hampe Faustman and starring Inga Tidblad, Eva Dahlbeck and Annalisa Ericson. It was shot at the Centrumateljéerna Studios in Stockholm and on location around the city. The film's sets were designed by the art director Nils Nilsson. It is also known by the alternative title Caged Women.

== Cast ==
- Inga Tidblad as Anna
- Eva Dahlbeck as Isa
- Annalisa Ericson as Sylvia
- Birgitta Valberg as Vera
- Ulla Sjöblom as Rosa Karlsson
- Kerstin Palo as Eva Lind
- Marrit Ohlsson as Ameli
- Georg Løkkeberg as Tryggve Krook
- Björn Berglund as Håkan Håkansson
- Harald Bergström as Photographer
- Gösta Holmström as Policeman
- Birger Lensander as Karlsson
- Kerstin Moheden as Tenant in the Women's House
- Gösta Petersson as Manager at Krook's Theater
- Hanny Schedin as Ms. Johansson
- Jan-Olof Strandberg as Rosa's boyfriend
- Bengt Sundmark as Policeman
- Ivar Wahlgren as Vicar

== Bibliography ==
- Qvist, Per Olov & von Bagh, Peter. Guide to the Cinema of Sweden and Finland. Greenwood Publishing Group, 2000.
