= Bengt Ekerot =

Swedish actor (1920–1971)

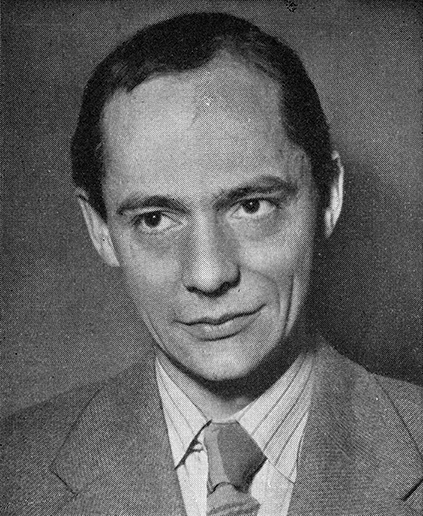
- Born: Nils Bengt Folke Ekerot; 8 February 1920; Stockholm, Sweden
- Died: 26 November 1971 (aged 51); Stockholm, Sweden
- Occupations: Actor, director
- Years active: 1940–1968
- Known for: Collaborations with Ingmar Bergman
- Notable work: The Seventh Seal, The Magician
- Spouses: Antoinette Gram (m. 1946) Margareta Hallin (m. 1959–1968)

Nils Bengt Folke Ekerot (8 February 1920 – 26 November 1971) was a Swedish actor and stage director best known for portraying Death in The Seventh Seal (1957) directed by Ingmar Bergman. In 1956, he directed the world premiere of Long Day's Journey into Night, considered the magnum opus of American playwright Eugene O'Neill.

== Early life ==
Ekerot was born in Stockholm.

== Career ==
He had several roles in Swedish films, but in Ingmar Bergman's The Seventh Seal (1957) he portrayed Death as a white-faced man in a black cloak. The decision to perform the role in this way was a joint decision between the actor and director. Bergman wrote in his autobiography Images: My Life in Film that the two men "agreed that Death should wear a clown mask, a white clown’s mask. A fusion of a clown mask and a skull."

He also appeared in Bergman's 1958 film, The Magician (also released as Ansiktet (lit. Swedish: "The Face") as Johan Spegel, an ailing vaudevillian.

== Death ==
A man with a self-destructive personality, health issues from smoking and excessive drinking affected Ekerot's later career resulting in him losing potential roles. He died from lung cancer in 1971.

== Partial filmography ==
- They Staked Their Lives (1940) - Freedom Fighter
- Hanna in Society (1940) - Fred Hummerberg
- The Talk of the Town (1941) - Sven Törring
- Snapphanar (1941) - Lille-Jonas
- Lågor i dunklet (1942) - Åke Kronström, Student (uncredited)
- We House Slaves (1942) - Linus Tallhagen
- Nothing Is Forgotten (1942) - Student at art school (uncredited)
- Night in Port (1943) - John
- När ungdomen vaknar (1943) - Lennart
- Sonja (1943) - Bengt
- Gentleman with a Briefcase (1943) - Stig
- Tre söner gick till flyget (1945) - Erik
- The Rose of Tistelön (1945) - Anton, hennes bror
- Fram för lilla Märta eller På livets ödesvägar (1945) - Radio Speaker (voice, uncredited)
- Crime and Punishment (1945) - Studenten
- 13 stolar (1945) - Clerk (uncredited)
- Brita in the Merchant's House (1946) - 'Paniken'
- Interlude (1946) - Tjuven
- Dynamite (1947) - Allan Axelson
- Marianne (1953) - Companion (uncredited)
- Hamlet (1955, TV Movie) - Hamlet, prins av Danmark
- Stage Entrance (1956) - Johan Eriksson
- The Seventh Seal (1957) - Death
- The Jazz Boy (1958) - Erik Jonsson
- The Magician (1958) - Johan Spegel
- On a Bench in a Park (1960) - Sam Persson
- Myten (1966) - Policeman / Social Worker / Guard / Doctor
- Here Is Your Life (1966) - Byberg
- Life's Just Great (1967) - The Neighbour
- Ola & Julia (1967) - Max
- Who Saw Him Die? (1968) - Eriksson
- Korridoren (1968) - Birger Olsson (final film role)
