= Dynamite (1947 film) =

1947 film

- Directed by: Åke Ohberg
- Written by: Harald Beijer
- Based on: Dynamite by Harald Beijer
- Produced by: Åke Ohberg
- Starring: Birgit Tengroth; Åke Ohberg; Bengt Ekerot; Marianne Löfgren
- Cinematography: Sven Thermænius
- Music by: Erland von Koch
- Production company: Sveafilm
- Distributed by: Sveafilm
- Release date: 7 February 1947
- Running time: 88 minutes
- Country: Sweden
- Language: Swedish

Dynamite (Swedish: Dynamit) is a 1947 Swedish crime drama film directed by Åke Ohberg and starring Birgit Tengroth, Bengt Ekerot and Marianne Löfgren. It was shot at the Centrumateljéerna Studios in Stockholm. The film's sets were designed by the art director Nils Nilsson.

== Synopsis ==
A young tearaway is drifting into a life of petty crime. He steals some dynamite in order to frighten people. However, one of his teachers believes that there is still hope for him.

== Cast ==
- Birgit Tengroth as Gudrun Brogren
- Åke Ohberg as Sixten Krogh
- Bengt Ekerot as Allan Axelson
- Marianne Löfgren as Ottilia Axelsson
- Carl Ström as Axelsson
- Nils Hallberg as Oskar Axelsson
- Hilda Borgström as Mrs. Plym
- Erik Berglund as Criminal Inspector
- Märta Arbin as Criminal Inspector's wife
- Ingemar Pallin as Criminal Inspector's son
- Gull Natorp as Dean's Wife
- Carin Swensson as Dean's housemaid
- Harry Ahlin as Bodin
- Sif Ruud as Mrs. Bodin
- Rudolf Wendbladh as Principal
- Olav Riégo as Colonel
- Maja Cassel as Colonel's wife
- Gustav Hedberg as Constable Svärd
- Gösta Ericsson as Constable Carlsson
- Åke Engfeldt as Lt. Erik Arnell
- Sten Lindgren as Larsson, grocery store owner
- Magnus Kesster as Complaining man
- Mona Geijer-Falkner as Woman in milk store
- Astrid Bodin as Woman in milk store
- Elsa Ebbesen as Woman

== Bibliography ==
- Larsson, Mariah & Marklund, Anders (ed.). Swedish Film: An Introduction and Reader. Nordic Academic Press, 2010.
- Qvist, Per Olov & von Bagh, Peter. Guide to the Cinema of Sweden and Finland. Greenwood Publishing Group, 2000.
