= She Came Like the Wind =

1952 film

- Directed by: Hampe Faustman
- Written by: Walentin Chorell (play); Herbert Grevenius
- Produced by: Rune Waldekranz
- Starring: Åke Grönberg; Margit Carlqvist; Britta Brunius
- Cinematography: Curt Jonsson
- Edited by: Eric Nordemar
- Music by: Carl-Olof Anderberg
- Production company: Sandrews
- Release date: 26 November 1952
- Running time: 84 minutes
- Country: Sweden
- Language: Swedish

She Came Like the Wind (Swedish: Hon kom som en vind) is a 1952 Swedish drama film directed by Hampe Faustman and starring Åke Grönberg, Margit Carlqvist and Britta Brunius. The film's sets were designed by the art director Nils Nilsson.

== Cast ==
- Åke Grönberg as Fabian Rosander
- Margit Carlqvist as Lilly Lilja
- Britta Brunius as Olga Rosander
- Arne Källerud as Karlsson
- Bengt Eklund as Gurra
- Gunnar Hellström as Olle
- Barbro Nordin as Ingrid
- Sigyn Sahlin as Brända brallisen
- Stig Johanson as Jansson
- Astrid Bodin as Mrs. Jansson
- Georg Skarstedt as Man at the party
- Birger Lensander as Arvid
- Bengt Sundmark as Foreman
- Gösta Holmström as Tidskrivaren
- Ulf Johansson as Listmannen
- Sven-Axel Carlsson as Warehouse worker
- Hampe Faustman as Funfair visitor
- Topsy Håkansson as Dancer
- Tor Isedal as Telegraph operator
- Nina Scenna as Customer
- Hanny Schedin as Mrs. Boman

== Bibliography ==
- Sundholm, John . Historical Dictionary of Scandinavian Cinema. Scarecrow Press, 2012.
