= George Fant (actor) =

Swedish actor (1916–1998)

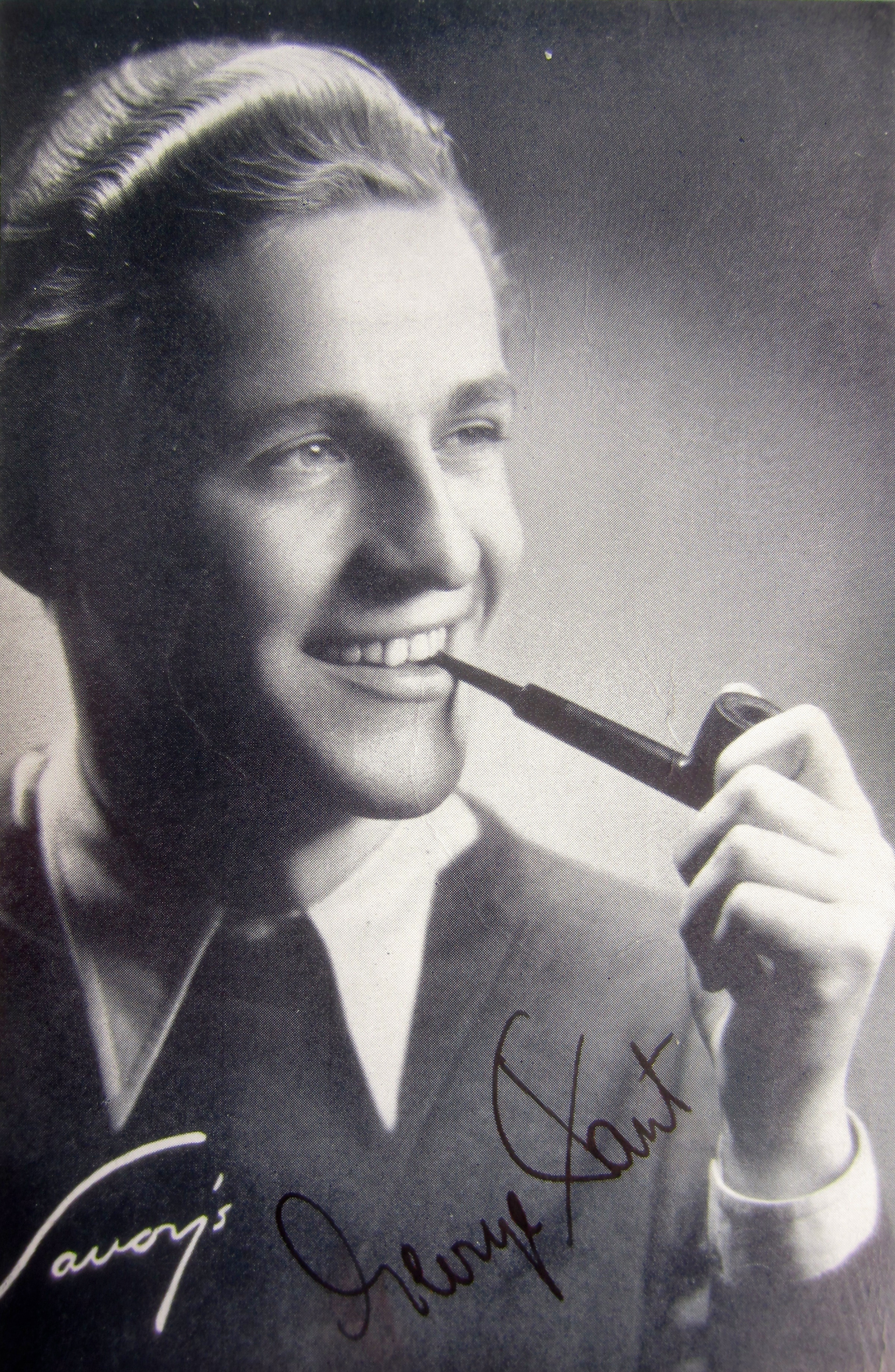
- Fant in 1941.
- Born: 11 July 1916; Stockholm, Sweden
- Died: 21 February 1998 (aged 81); Stockholm, Sweden
- Occupations: Actor, director, theater manager
- Years active: 1936–1997

George Fant (born Georg Fredrik Mikael Fant; 11 July 1916 – 21 February 1998) was a Swedish actor, director and theater manager. He appeared in 50 films between 1936 and 1995.

Fant was the son of Captain Tore Fant and Stina Fant (née Gustafsson). He was the older brother of Swedish actor, director, and writer Kenne Fant and first cousin of speech scientist Gunnar Fant. He was father of actor Christer Fant.

== Selected filmography ==
- Adventure (1936)
- Kungen kommer (1936)
- The Wedding Trip (1936)
- Johan Ulfstjerna (1936)
- John Ericsson, Victor of Hampton Roads (1937)
- Klart till drabbning (1937)
- Dollar (1938)
- Landstormens lilla Lotta (1939)
- Bright Prospects (1941)
- Scanian Guerilla (1941)
- Dunungen (1941)
- Landstormens lilla argbigga (1941)
- Life in the Country (1943)
- Katrina (1943)
- Blood and Fire (1945)
- The Rose of Tistelön (1945)
- Harald the Stalwart (1946)
- The Bells of the Old Town (1946)
- Brita in the Merchant's House (1946)
- Maria (1947)
- Främmande hamn (1948)
- Lars Hård (1948)
- Number 17 (1949)
- Time of Desire (1954)
- Voyage in the Night (1955)
- A Doll's House (1956)
- Gårdarna runt sjön (1957)
- Mother Takes a Vacation (1957)
- The Phantom Carriage (1958)
- When Darkness Falls (1960)
- Good Friends and Faithful Neighbours (1960)
- Änglar, finns dom? (1961)
- Kristin Lavransdatter (1995)
- Skärgårdsdoktorn (1997) (TV Series)
