= Birger Lensander =

Swedish actor (1908–1971)

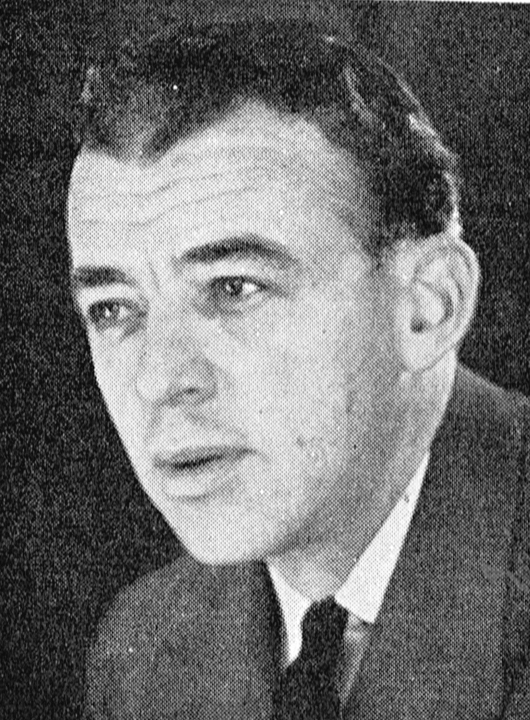
- Born: Birger Alexander Lensander; 21 October 1908; Södertälje, Sweden
- Died: 3 March 1971 (aged 62); Stockholm, Sweden
- Occupation: Actor
- Years active: 1943-1969

Birger Lensander (21 October 1908 – 3 March 1971) was a Swedish actor. He appeared in more than 70 films and television shows between 1943 and 1969.

== Selected filmography ==
- The Girls in Smaland (1945)
- Neglected by His Wife (1947)
- Lars Hård (1948)
- Robinson in Roslagen (1948)
- Foreign Harbour (1948)
- The Quartet That Split Up (1950)
- She Came Like the Wind (1952)
- Ursula, the Girl from the Finnish Forests (1953)
- The Road to Klockrike (1953)
- House of Women (1953)
- Dance, My Doll (1953)
- Café Lunchrasten (1954)
- Our Father and the Gypsy (1954)
- People of the Finnish Forests (1955)
- Voyage in the Night (1955)
- A Little Nest (1956)
- The Song of the Scarlet Flower (1956)
- The Stranger from the Sky (1956)
- Seventeen Years Old (1957)
- Synnöve Solbakken (1957)
- Bill Bergson Lives Dangerously (1957)
- Laila (1958)
- We at Väddö (1958)
- Fridolf Stands Up! (1958)
- Heart's Desire (1960)
- The Mistress (1962)
- Nightmare (1965)
- Ön (1966)
- Woman of Darkness (1966)
- Here's Your Life (1966)
