= Brita in the Merchant's House =

1946 film

- Directed by: Åke Ohberg
- Written by: Ragnar Arvedson; Harald Beijer
- Based on: Brita in the Merchant's House by Harald Beijer
- Produced by: Lennart Landheim
- Starring: George Fant; Eva Dahlbeck; Åke Grönberg
- Cinematography: Harald Berglund
- Edited by: Gösta Bjurman
- Music by: Nathan Görling
- Production company: Europa Film
- Distributed by: Europa Film
- Release date: 4 February 1946
- Running time: 102 minutes
- Country: Sweden
- Language: Swedish

Brita in the Merchant's House (Swedish: Brita i grosshandlarhuset) is a 1946 Swedish drama film directed by Åke Ohberg and starring George Fant, Eva Dahlbeck and Åke Grönberg. It was shot at the Sundbyberg Studios in Stockholm. The film's sets were designed by the art director Max Linder.

== Synopsis ==
Brita leaves her dull, impoverished rural existence and moves to Stockholm where she gets a job as a maid in the house of a wealthy wholesaler where she falls in love with the merchant's son. However, Arvid, a young man from her home village comes to the city to court her as well.

== Cast ==
- George Fant as Greger
- Eva Dahlbeck as Brita
- Åke Grönberg as Arvid
- Ernst Eklund as Grosshandlaren
- Stina Hedberg as Hans fru
- Hilda Borgström as Ida
- Olav Riégo as Kanslirådet
- Renée Björling as Hans fru
- Agneta Lagerfeldt as Sonja
- Ib Schønberg as Korvgubben
- Bengt Ekerot as 'Paniken'
- Carl Ström as Britas far
- Linnéa Hillberg as Britas mor
- Anna-Greta Krigström as Ella
- Astrid Bodin as Kokerskan
- Carin Swensson as Extrahjälpen
- Olle Hilding as Olsson
- John Norrman as Postman
- Aurore Palmgren as Arvid's Mother
- Nils Hallberg as Conscript
- Ingemar Holde as Conscript
- Tord Stål as Officer
- Albert Ståhl as Janitor

== Bibliography ==
- Qvist, Per Olov & von Bagh, Peter. Guide to the Cinema of Sweden and Finland. Greenwood Publishing Group, 2000.
