= Voyage in the Night =

1955 film

- Directed by: Hampe Faustman
- Written by: Olle Hellbom
- Starring: George Fant; Eva Dahlbeck; Ulla Sallert
- Cinematography: Rune Ericson
- Edited by: Eric Nordemar
- Music by: Carl-Olof Anderberg
- Production company: AB F-Produktion
- Distributed by: Sandrew-Baumanfilm
- Release date: 31 January 1955
- Running time: 92 minutes
- Country: Sweden
- Language: Swedish

Voyage in the Night (Swedish: Resa i natten) is a 1955 Swedish drama film directed by Hampe Faustman and starring George Fant, Eva Dahlbeck and Ulla Sallert. It was shot at the Centrumateljéerna Studios in Stockholm. The film's sets were designed by the art director Nils Nilsson.

== Cast ==
- George Fant as Gösta Lundberg
- Eva Dahlbeck as Birgitta Lundberg
- Ulla Sallert as Irene Haller Alias Anna-Lisa Karlsson
- Sven-Eric Gamble as Åke Eriksson
- Arne Källerud as Jompa
- Amy Jelf as Britt-Marie - Åke's Fiancée
- Gunnar Olsson as Johan - Britt-Marie's Father
- Catrin Westerlund as Kerstin
- Peter Lindgren as Berra
- Georg Skarstedt as Johansson
- Ivar Wahlgren as Cattle Controller
- Elisabeth Liljenroth as The Girl in Johansson's Truck
- Curt 'Minimal' Åström as Svensson
- Gösta Holmström as Police
- Barbro Hörberg as Bettan - Irene's Friend
- Ragnar Arvedson as Danish Theatre Manager
- Björn Berglund as Doctor
- Sven-Axel Carlsson as Steinar - Truck Driver
- David Erikson as Café Supervisor
- John Harryson as Car Driver
- Sven Holmberg as Clerk
- Arthur Hultling as Truck Driver
- Stig Johanson as Truck Driver
- Birger Lensander as Lasse
- Karin Miller as Waitress
- Marianne Nielsen as Gossip
- Hanny Schedin as Car Driver
- Sture Ström as Major
- Bengt Sundmark as Mankan
- Ilse-Nore Tromm as Britt-Marie's Mother
- Gunnel Wadner as Telegraph Clerk

== Bibliography ==
- Qvist, Per Olov & von Bagh, Peter. Guide to the Cinema of Sweden and Finland. Greenwood Publishing Group, 2000.
