= Mimi Nelson =

Swedish actress

- Born: 25 October 1922; Gemla, Sweden
- Died: 3 July 1999 (aged 76); Stockholm, Sweden
- Occupation: Actress
- Years active: 1943-1969

Mimi Nelson (25 October 1922 – 3 July 1999) was a Swedish film actress. She appeared in Ingmar Bergman's films Port of Call (1948) and Thirst (1949).

== Selected filmography ==
- Life and Death (1943)
- The Sixth Shot (1943)
- I Killed (1943)
- Live Dangerously (1944)
- Incorrigible (1946)
- Youth in Danger (1946)
- Maria (1947)
- The Night Watchman's Wife (1947)
- Loffe the Tramp (1948)
- Number 17 (1949)
- Woman in White (1949)
- Restaurant Intim (1950)
- Say It with Flowers (1952)
- Hidden in the Fog (1953)
- When the Mills are Running (1956)
- When Darkness Falls (1960)
