= Ulla Akselson =

Swedish actress (1924–2007)

- Born: Ulla Mariana Akselson; 23 November 1924; Solna, Sweden
- Died: 20 February 2007 (aged 82); Sweden
- Other name: Ulla Axelsson
- Occupation: Actress

Ulla Mariana Akselson (23 November 1924 – 20 February 2007), also known as Ulla Axelsson, was a Swedish actress born in Solna.

== Selected filmography ==
- Chock - 1997, a TV series 1 episode
- Societetshuset - 1963, a TV miniseries 4 episodes
- Here is your Life - 1966, a Movie
- The Baby Carriage - 1963, a movie
