= A Dreamer's Journey =

1957 film

- Directed by: Lars-Magnus Lindgren
- Written by: Lars-Magnus Lindgren
- Produced by: Rune Waldekranz
- Starring: Jarl Kulle; Margit Carlqvist; Inga Landgré
- Cinematography: Sven Nykvist
- Edited by: Carl-Olov Skeppstedt
- Music by: Lille Bror Söderlundh
- Production company: Sandrews
- Distributed by: Sandrew-Baumanfilm
- Release date: 25 March 1957
- Running time: 99 minutes
- Country: Sweden
- Language: Swedish

A Dreamer's Journey (Swedish: En drömmares vandring) is a 1957 Swedish biographical drama film directed by Lars-Magnus Lindgren and starring Jarl Kulle, Margit Carlqvist and Inga Landgré. It was shot at the Centrumateljéerna Studios in Stockholm. The film's sets were designed by the art director Nils Nilsson. It is based on the life of the poet Dan Andersson.

== Cast ==
- Jarl Kulle as Dan Andersson
- Margit Carlqvist as Marja Lisa
- Inga Landgré as Ziri Stuart
- Georg Rydeberg as Hartmann
- Axel Slangus as Karigo
- Hugo Björne as Dan's Father
- Linnéa Hillberg as Dan's Mother
- Peter Lindgren as Anders Kolare
- Keve Hjelm as Karl-Anton
- Helge Hagerman as Vicar
- Olof Thunberg as Mr. Stuart
- David Erikson as Domkvist
- Erik Hell as Erik Axel Blom
- Åke Fridell as Terje
- Jan-Olof Strandberg as Martinus
- Tord Stål as Publisher
- Brita Öberg as Old woman
- Gregor Dahlman as Svarta Te
- John Norrman as Mats Kolare
- Jan Kings as Dan as a child
- Marina Stagh as Young Marja Lisa
- Jörgen Hasselblad as Young Karl-Anton
- Margareta Bergman as Vainos-Kari
- Otto Blixt as Varfors-Fredrik
- Kurt Emke as Karis-Janken
- Dan Eriksson as Charcoaler
- Manne Grünberger as Music salesman
- Karl-Erik Gustafsson a Björnbergs-Jon
- Anton Hedlund as Charcoaler
- Gunde Johansson as Charcoaler
- Sven Melin as Mård-Jon
- Margareta Palmgren as Girl at party
- Nils Parling as Charcoaler
- Inger Qvist as Girl at party
- Olof Sandborg as Kettilä-Jerk
- Else-Marie Sundin as Student
- Bengt Sundmark as Jon Kolare
- Måns Westfelt as Rev. Görelsson

== Bibliography ==
- Qvist, Per Olov & von Bagh, Peter. Guide to the Cinema of Sweden and Finland. Greenwood Publishing Group, 2000.
