= Rudolf Värnlund =

Swedish writer (1900–1945)

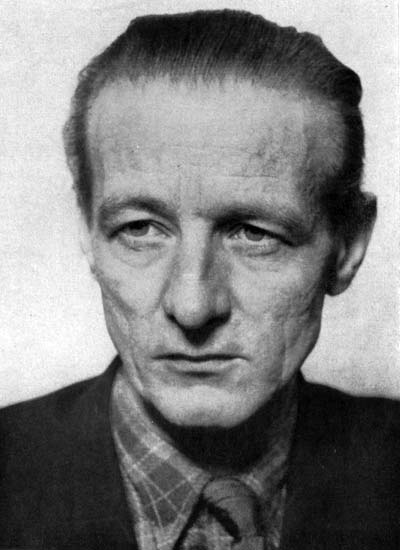
- Born: 6 February 1900; Stockholm, Sweden
- Died: 16 February 1945 (aged 45); Österskär, Sweden
- Occupation: Author

Rudolf Värnlund (6 February 1900 – 16 February 1945) was a Swedish novelist, short story writer and playwright. Värnlund had his biggest success as a playwright with his play Den heliga familjen (1932).

== Biography ==
Värnlund grew up in the district of Södermalm in Stockholm, Sweden. He found work as a typesetter and in his free time devoted himself to intense studies of literature and politics and began to write stories and articles. His writing was frequently published in the anarchist magazine Brand. Värnlund made several travels to Berlin in the 1920s, experiencing the postwar anxiety and atmosphere of the time.

Värnlund had his first book, the short story collection Döda människor ("Dead humans") published in 1924. By then he had already written numerous plays and works of prose. He was very productive and published several novels in the late 1920s and 1930s which generally received poor reviews. Contemporary critics had little understanding of his intense, expressionistic style. Although later Värnlund has been regarded as an important proletarian writer. He was the first writer to depict Stockholm from a proletarian perspective in novels such as Upproret ("The Uprising", 1927), which along with the unusually lighthearted Det druckna kvarteret ("The drunken neighbourhood", 1928) and Man bygger ett hus ("A House is being built", 1938), is one of his best known novels. His play Den heliga familjen (The holy family) opened at the Royal Dramatic Theatre (Kungliga Dramatiska Teatern) in March 1932 under the direction of Alf Sjöberg.

Rudolf Värnlund died in a fire at Österskär during 1945 and was buried at Skogskyrkogården in Stockholm.

== Other sources ==
- Mattsson, Per-Olof (1989) Amor Fati - Rudolf Värnlund som prosaförfattare (Stockholm : Akademitryck AB) ISBN 9171467874
- Värnlund, Holger (1992) Fem steg över parketten. Holger Värnlund om Rudolf Värnlund (Stockholm : Carlsson) ISBN 9177984838

== Related reading ==
- Den svenska litteraturen 1920–1950. Modernister och arbetardiktare, Bonniers 1989
- Lars Furuland, introduction to Rudolf Värnlund Man bygger ett hus, Tidens förlag 1975
