= The Magician (1958 film) =

1958 film by Ingmar Bergman

- Theatrical release poster
- Directed by: Ingmar Bergman
- Written by: Ingmar Bergman
- Produced by: Allan Ekelund
- Starring: Max von Sydow; Ingrid Thulin; Gunnar Björnstrand; Bibi Andersson
- Cinematography: Gunnar Fischer
- Edited by: Oscar Rosander
- Music by: Erik Nordgren
- Distributed by: AB Svensk Filmindustri
- Release date: 26 December 1958
- Running time: 107 minutes
- Country: Sweden
- Language: Swedish

Ansiktet (lit. 'The Face'), also released as The Magician, is a 1958 Swedish film written and directed by Ingmar Bergman, starring Max von Sydow and Ingrid Thulin. The plot follows a traveling magician named Albert Vogler, whose allegedly supernatural live shows are challenged by the skeptical population of a small village.

Blending elements of psychological drama and horror, the film was distantly inspired by G. K. Chesterton's 1913 play Magic.

The film was selected as the Swedish entry for the Best Foreign Language Film at the 31st Academy Awards, but was not accepted as a nominee.

== Plot ==
Albert Vogler is a magician who leads a troupe of performers, known as Vogler's Magnetic Health Theater, who claim to possess supernatural abilities. Among them are Albert's grandmother, Granny Vogler; his wife Manda, who performs in costume as a man under the alias Mr. Aman; his charismatic assistant, Tubal; and their driver, Simson. Albert proclaims to have discovered animal magnetism. After leaving a show in Copenhagen, the group travel by carriage through the wilderness into Sweden, and hear screams emanating from the woods. They find an ill man lying on the ground nearby, who introduces himself as Johan Spegel, a former vaudevillian. The troupe decide to bring him along with them, and he becomes progressively ill. Albert keenly observes Johan as he apparently dies in the carriage.

The troupe arrive in a village and are met by Consul Egerman who, along with his wife Ottilia, is interested in the occult. Tubal informs Egerman and his associates that Albert is mute, and the townsmen question the nature of their magic show based on the advertisements promoting it. Dr. Vergerus, the Minister of Health, accuses Albert of practicing quackery and pseudoscience; the men privately plan to wager on Albert's abilities. Later, the troupe have dinner with Sara and Sanna, two servants who are enthralled by their presence, and Tubal peddles love potions made by Granny. The head cook, Sofia, is impervious to Tubal's bravado, but finds him attractive and solicits him for sex.

As a storm brews, Sanna grows frightened of the group after Granny tells her she is a witch who is 200 years old. Meanwhile, Simson flirts with Sara, and the two drink the aphrodisiac potions together before having sex. Ottilia approaches Albert and tells him that she believes in his powers, and that her husband and the other townsmen criticize him only because they do not understand him. She further explains that she hopes he can make contact with her deceased daughter. After Ottilia leaves, Albert is visited by Johan, who did not die. Johan laments his "unused" life to Albert before dying in his arms; Albert conceals his body in a hidden compartment of a large trunk. Egerman observes the exchange from the shadows and is shaken by it, unsure if he has witnessed an apparition.

Dr. Vergerus approaches Manda in her room, her masculine disguise removed. She tells him the troupe are fleeing from the authorities, and admits that the group's entire act is a fraud. Albert listens to their conversation before entering the room, and assaults Vergerus when he goads him. Albert removes his wig, and Manda comforts him, recounting their travails on the road, the home they left behind, and his decision to disguise himself as a mute.

The following morning, the troupe perform a magic show for the townspeople. Tubal asks Henrietta Starbeck, the wife of the Police Superintendent, to be a volunteer in the show; apparently using magnets, Manda elicits cruel admissions from Henrietta about her husband, publicly humiliating him. Next, Engelson volunteers Antonsson, the stableman, for a trick in which Albert apparently manipulates his body. During the performance, Albert collapses and dies, and Antonsson flees in horror, later committing suicide. Albert's body is placed in his trunk—which, unbeknownst to Vergerus, also contains Johan's body—and brought to the attic for an autopsy.

After Vergerus performs a full autopsy, he is terrified when Albert emerges from the shadows, alive. Vergerus demands to know whose body he has performed an autopsy on. Albert responds that it was a "poor actor"—it was in fact Johan, who was also in the trunk. Angered, Vergerus remarks the troupe's performance as "miserable", and contemptuously pays Albert with a single coin for the entertainment. Manda has Simson hitch their horses so the troupe can leave, but Tubal tells her he wishes to stay with Sofia. Granny also tells Manda she will no longer join them, and plans to live the remainder of her years with the funds she has saved by selling her potions. Upset over Simson's departure, Sara asks Albert and Manda if she can join them, to which they agree. Before they can depart, Albert and Manda are escorted back into the house by police officers. They initially believe they are to be charged with crimes, but, to their surprise, the Police Superintendent Starbeck notifies them that the king wishes to have them perform at the Royal Palace. Shortly afterward, Albert, Manda, Simson, and Sara depart for Stockholm.

== Cast ==
- Max von Sydow as Albert Emanuel Vogler
- Ingrid Thulin as Manda Vogler
- Gunnar Björnstrand as Dr. Vergerus, Minister of Health
- Naima Wifstrand as Granny Vogler
- Bengt Ekerot as Johan Spegel
- Bibi Andersson as Sara
- Birgitta Pettersson as Sanna
- Gertrud Fridh as Ottilia Egerman
- Lars Ekborg as Simson, the coach driver
- Toivo Pawlo as Police Superintendent Starbeck
- Erland Josephson as Consul Egerman
- Åke Fridell as Tubal
- Sif Ruud as Sofia Garp
- Oscar Ljung as Antonsson, burly stableman
- Ulla Sjöblom as Henrietta Starbeck
- Axel Düberg as Rustan, young manservant

== Production ==
In 1946, Bergman had staged a theatre production of G. K. Chesterton's 1913 play Magic in Swedish. The play distantly inspired the film.

Filming took place at the Filmstaden studios from June 30 and terminated on August 27, 1958.

== Release ==
The film was theatrically released in Sweden on 26 December 1958.

== Reception ==
The Magician has a 100% approval rating on Rotten Tomatoes, based on 13 reviews, and an average rating of 8.1/10. Don Druker of the Chicago Reader called it "one of Bergman's most tightly structured and frightening films". Author and film critic Leonard Maltin awarded the film three out of four stars, calling it "A thoughtful (and too-long underrated) portrait of a man who is part-faker, part-genius". The film won Grand Jury Prize, New Cinema Award and the Pasinetti Award at 1959 Venice Film Festival. It was also nominated for the Golden Lion. The Film was nominated for a BAFTA Award in Best Film From Any Source category in 1960.

== See also ==
- List of submissions to the 31st Academy Awards for Best Foreign Language Film
- List of Swedish submissions for the Academy Award for Best Foreign Language Film
