= The Seventh Seal =

1957 film by Ingmar Bergman

- Theatrical release poster
- Swedish: Det sjunde inseglet
- Directed by: Ingmar Bergman
- Screenplay by: Ingmar Bergman
- Based on: Trämålning by Ingmar Bergman
- Produced by: Allan Ekelund
- Starring: Gunnar Björnstrand; Bengt Ekerot; Nils Poppe; Max von Sydow; Bibi Andersson; Inga Landgré; Åke Fridell
- Cinematography: Gunnar Fischer
- Edited by: Lennart Wallén
- Music by: Erik Nordgren
- Distributed by: AB Svensk Filmindustri
- Release date: 16 February 1957
- Running time: 96 minutes
- Country: Sweden
- Languages: Swedish; Latin
- Budget: $150,000

The Seventh Seal (Swedish: Det sjunde inseglet) is a 1957 Swedish historical fantasy film written and directed by Ingmar Bergman. It stars Max von Sydow as Antonius Block, a medieval knight returning to Sweden during the Black Death after the Crusades, who challenges the personification of Death (Bengt Ekerot) to a game of chess in an attempt to delay his fate. The cast also features Gunnar Björnstrand, Nils Poppe, Bibi Andersson, Inga Gill, Maud Hansson, and Gunnel Lindblom.

Bergman developed the screenplay from his one-act play Trämålning (Wood Painting), which had been written for the Royal Dramatic Theatre in Stockholm. The film's title is derived from the seventh seal described in the Book of Revelation, a biblical passage quoted both in the opening narration and near the conclusion of the film, while the silence that follows the opening of the seal reflects one of the film's central themes: "the silence of God". Produced by Svensk Filmindustri, The Seventh Seal was photographed by Gunnar Fischer and marked the beginning of Max von Sydow's long collaboration with Bergman. Filmed primarily at Filmstaden Studios in Solna and on location in southern Sweden, the production combined medieval allegory with existential themes influenced by Bergman's reflections on faith, mortality, and the human condition. The film's final "Dance of Death" sequence, silhouetted against the horizon, became one of the most recognizable images in the history of cinema.

The Seventh Seal premiered in Sweden on 16 February 1957 and received international recognition after winning the Special Jury Prize at the 1957 Cannes Film Festival. It established Bergman as one of the leading directors of world cinema and has since been widely regarded as one of the greatest films ever made. Its imagery and themes have had a lasting influence on popular culture, inspiring numerous homages, parodies, and critical analyses.

== Plot ==
Disillusioned knight Antonius Block and his cynical squire Jöns return from the Crusades to find the country ravaged by the plague. The knight encounters Death, whom he challenges to a chess match, believing he can survive as long as the game continues.

The knight and his squire pass a caravan of actors: Jof and his wife Mia, with their infant son Mikael and actor-manager Jonas Skat. Waking early, Jof has a vision of Mary leading the infant Jesus, which he relates to a smilingly disbelieving Mia.

Block and Jöns visit a church where a fresco of the Danse Macabre is being painted. The squire chides the artist for colluding in the ideological fervor that led to the crusade. In the confessional, Block tells the priest he wants to perform "one meaningful deed" after what he now sees as a pointless life. Upon revealing to him the chess tactic that will save his life, the knight discovers that it is actually Death with whom he has been speaking. Leaving the church, Block speaks to a young woman condemned to be burned at the stake for consorting with the Devil. He believes she will tell him about life beyond death, only to find that she is insane.

The final scene depicting the Danse Macabre.

In a deserted village, Jöns saves a mute servant girl from being raped by Raval, a theologian who ten years earlier had persuaded the knight to join the Crusades and is now a thief. Jöns vows to destroy his face if they meet again. Jöns kisses the servant girl, who resists his advances. He then tells her to repay her debt by becoming his servant. She reluctantly agrees. The group goes into a town where the actors are performing. Skat is enticed away for a tryst by Lisa, wife of the blacksmith Plog. The stage show is interrupted by a procession of flagellants led by a preacher who harangues the townspeople.

At the town's inn, Raval manipulates Plog and other customers into intimidating Jof. The bullying is broken up by Jöns, who slashes Raval's face. The knight and squire are joined by Jof's family, and the mute servant girl. Block enjoys a picnic of milk and wild strawberries that Mia has gathered and promises to remember that evening for the rest of his life.

He then invites Plog and the actors to shelter from the plague in his castle. When they encounter Skat and Lisa in the forest, she returns to Plog, while Skat fakes a remorseful suicide. As the group moves on, Skat climbs a tree to spend the night, but Death appears beneath and cuts down the tree.

Meeting the condemned woman being led to execution, Block asks her to summon Satan so he can question him about God. The girl claims she has done so, but the knight only sees her terror and gives her herbs to take away her pain as she is placed on the pyre.

They encounter Raval, stricken by the plague. Jöns stops the servant girl from uselessly bringing him water, and Raval dies alone. Jof then sees the knight playing chess with Death and decides to flee with his family, while Block knowingly keeps Death occupied.

As Death states, "No one escapes me," Block knocks the chess pieces over, but Death restores them to their places. On the next move, Death wins the game and announces that when they meet again, it will be the last time for all. Death then asks Block if he achieved the "meaningful deed" he wished to accomplish. The knight replies that he has.

Block is reunited with his wife and the party shares a final supper, interrupted by Death's arrival. The other members of the party then introduce themselves, and the formerly mute servant girl greets him with "It is finished."

Jof and his family have sheltered in their caravan from a storm, which he interprets as the Angel of Death passing by. In the morning, Jof sees a vision of the knight and his companions being led away over the hillside in a Dance of Death.

== Cast ==
- Gunnar Björnstrand – Jöns, squire
- Bengt Ekerot – Death
- Nils Poppe – Jof
- Max von Sydow – Antonius Block, knight
- Bibi Andersson – Mia
- Inga Landgré – Karin
- Åke Fridell – Blacksmith Plog
- Inga Gill – Lisa
- Erik Strandmark – Jonas Skat
- Bertil Anderberg – Raval, the thief
- Gunnel Lindblom – Mute girl
- Maud Hansson – Witch
- Gunnar Olsson – church painter
- Anders Ek – The Monk
- Benkt-Åke Benktsson – Merchant
- Gudrun Brost – Maid
- Ulf Johanson – Jack's leader (uncredited)

== Themes ==
=== Christianity and faith ===
The title refers to a passage about the end of the world from the Book of Revelation, used both at the very start of the film, and again towards the end, beginning with the words "And when the Lamb had opened the seventh seal, there was silence in heaven about the space of half an hour" (Revelation 8:1). Thus, in the confessional scene the knight states: "Is it so cruelly inconceivable to grasp God with the senses? Why should He hide himself in a mist of half-spoken promises and unseen miracles?...What is going to happen to those of us who want to believe but aren't able to?" Death, impersonating the confessional priest, refuses to reply. Similarly, later, as he eats the strawberries with the family of actors, Antonius Block states: "Faith is a torment – did you know that? It is like loving someone who is out there in the darkness but never appears, no matter how loudly you call." Melvyn Bragg notes that the concept of the "Silence of God" in the face of evil, or the pleas of believers or would-be-believers, may be influenced by the punishments of silence meted out by Bergman's father, a chaplain in the State Lutheran Church. In Bergman's original radio play sometimes translated as A Painting on Wood, the figure of Death in a Dance of Death is represented not by an actor, but by silence, "mere nothingness, mere absence...terrifying...the void."

Some of the powerful influences on the film were Picasso's picture of the two acrobats, Carl Orff's Carmina Burana, Strindberg's dramas Folkungasagan ("The Saga of the Folkung Kings") and The Road to Damascus, the frescoes at Härkeberga church, and a painting by Albertus Pictor in Täby church. Just prior to shooting, Bergman directed for radio the play Everyman by Hugo von Hofmannsthal. By this time he had also directed plays by Shakespeare, Strindberg, Camus, Chesterton, Anouilh, Tennessee Williams, Pirandello, Lehár, Molière and Ostrovsky. The actors Bibi Andersson (with whom Bergman was in a relationship from 1955 to 1959) who played the juggler's wife Mia, and Max von Sydow, whose role as the knight was the first of many star parts he would bring to Bergman's films and whose rugged Nordic dignity became a vital resource within Bergman's "troupe" of key actors, both made a strong impact on the mood and style of the film.

=== Death ===
Death and Antonius Block choose sides for the chess game

Bergman grew up in a home infused with an intense Christianity, his father being a charismatic rector (this may have explained Bergman's adolescent infatuation with Hitler, which later deeply tormented him). As a six-year-old child, Bergman used to help the gardener carry corpses from the Royal Hospital Sophiahemmet (where his father was chaplain) to the mortuary. When as a boy he saw the film Black Beauty, the fire scene excited him so much he stayed in bed for three days with a temperature. The Seventh Seal explores the knight's search for meaning and purpose in creating meaningful acts in his life before his death. Despite living a Bohemian lifestyle in partial rebellion against his upbringing, Bergman often signed his scripts with the initials "S.D.G" (Soli Deo Gloria) — "To God Alone the Glory" — just as J. S. Bach did at the end of every musical composition.

Gerald Mast writes:

"Like the gravedigger in Hamlet, the Squire [...] treats death as a bitter and hopeless joke. Since we all play chess with death, and since we all must suffer through that hopeless joke, the only question about the game is how long it will last and how well we will play it. To play it well, to live, is to love and not to hate the body and the mortal as the Church urges in Bergman's metaphor."

Melvyn Bragg writes:

"[I]t is constructed like an argument. It is a story told as a sermon might be delivered: an allegory...each scene is at once so simple and so charged and layered that it catches us again and again...Somehow all of Bergman's own past, that of his father, that of his reading and doing and seeing, that of his Swedish culture, of his political burning and religious melancholy, poured into a series of pictures which carry that swell of contributions and contradictions so effortlessly that you could tell the story to a child, publish it as a storybook of photographs and yet know that the deepest questions of religion and the most mysterious revelation of simply being alive are both addressed."

The Jesuit publication America identifies it as having begun "a series of seven films that explored the possibility of faith in a post-Holocaust, nuclear age". Likewise, film historians Thomas W. Bohn and Richard L. Stromgren identify this film as beginning "his cycle of films dealing with the conundrum of religious faith".

=== Portrait of the Middle Ages ===
Medieval Sweden as portrayed in this movie includes creative anachronisms. The flagellant movement was foreign to Sweden, and large-scale witch persecutions only began in the 15th century. In addition, the main period of the Crusades is well before this era; they took place in a more optimistic period.

With regard to the relevancy of historical accuracy to a film that is heavily metaphorical and allegorical, John Aberth, writing in A Knight at the Movies, holds

the film only partially succeeds in conveying the period atmosphere and thought world of the fourteenth century. Bergman would probably counter that it was never his intention to make an historical or period film. As it was written in a program note that accompanied the movie's premier "It is a modern poem presented with medieval material that has been very freely handled... The script in particular—embodies a mid-twentieth century existentialist angst... Still, to be fair to Bergman, one must allow him his artistic license, and the script's modernisms may be justified as giving the movie's medieval theme a compelling and urgent contemporary relevance... Yet the film succeeds to a large degree because it is set in the Middle Ages, a time that can seem both very remote and very immediate to us living in the modern world... Ultimately The Seventh Seal should be judged as a historical film by how well it combines the medieval and the modern."

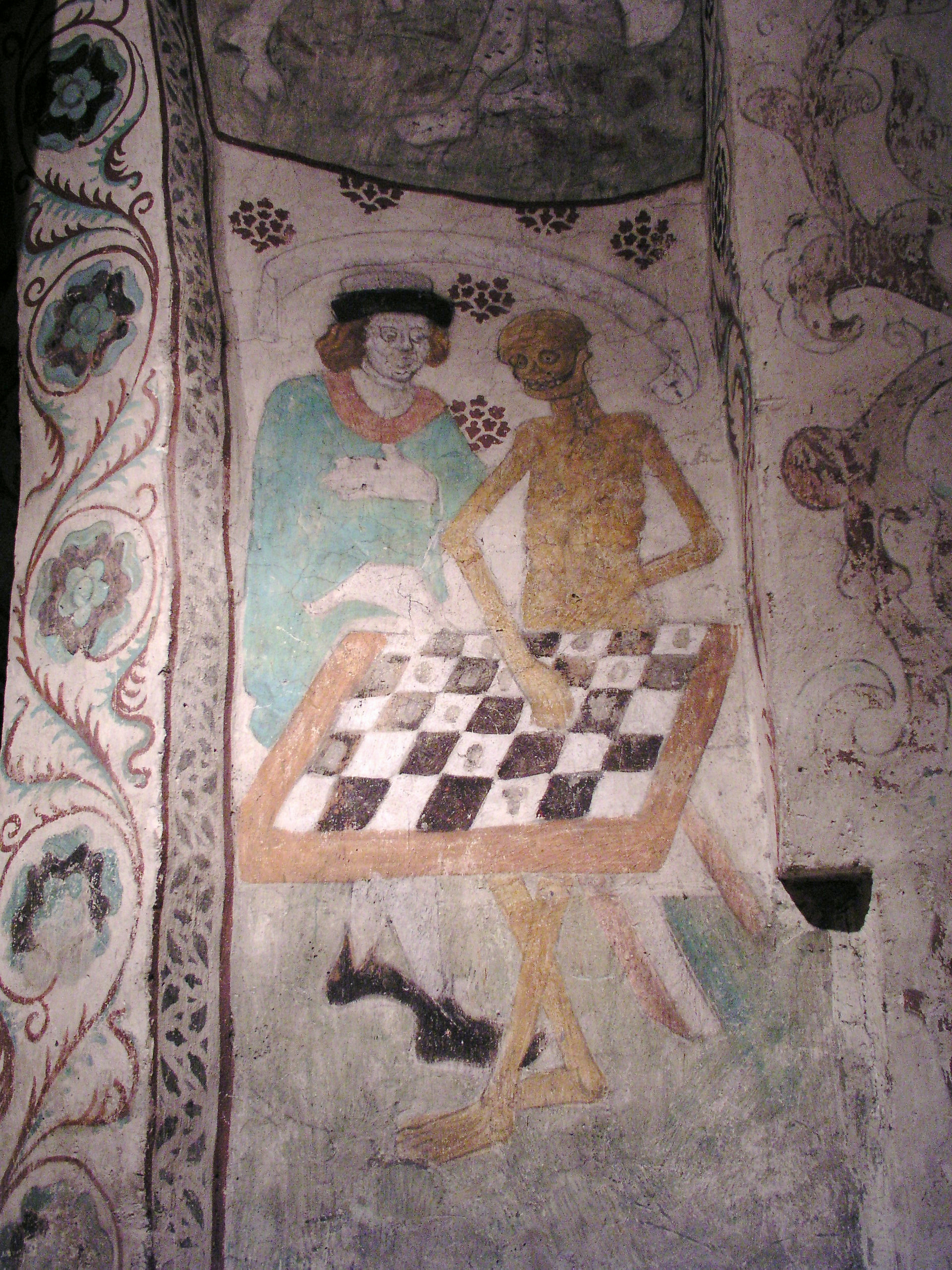
Death playing chess, from Täby Church, fresco by Albertus Pictor

Similarly defending it as an allegory, Aleksander Kwiatkowski in the book Swedish Film Classics, writes

The international response to the film which among other awards won the jury's special prize at Cannes in 1957 reconfirmed the author's high rank and proved that The Seventh Seal regardless of its degree of accuracy in reproducing medieval scenery may be considered as a universal, timeless allegory.

Much of the film's imagery is derived from medieval art. For example, Bergman has stated that the image of a man playing chess with a skeletal Death was inspired by a medieval church painting from the 1480s in Täby kyrka, Täby, north of Stockholm, painted by Albertus Pictor.

Generally speaking, historians Johan Huizinga, Friedrich Heer and Barbara Tuchman have all argued that the Late Middle Ages of the 14th century was a period of "doom and gloom" similar to what is reflected in this film, characterized by a feeling of pessimism, an increase in a penitential style of piety that was slightly masochistic, all aggravated by various disasters such as the Black Death, famine, the Hundred Years' War between France and England, and the Papal schism. This is sometimes called the crisis of the Late Middle Ages, and Tuchman regards the 14th century as "a distant mirror" of the 20th century in a way that echoes Bergman's sensibilities.

== Production ==
=== Development ===
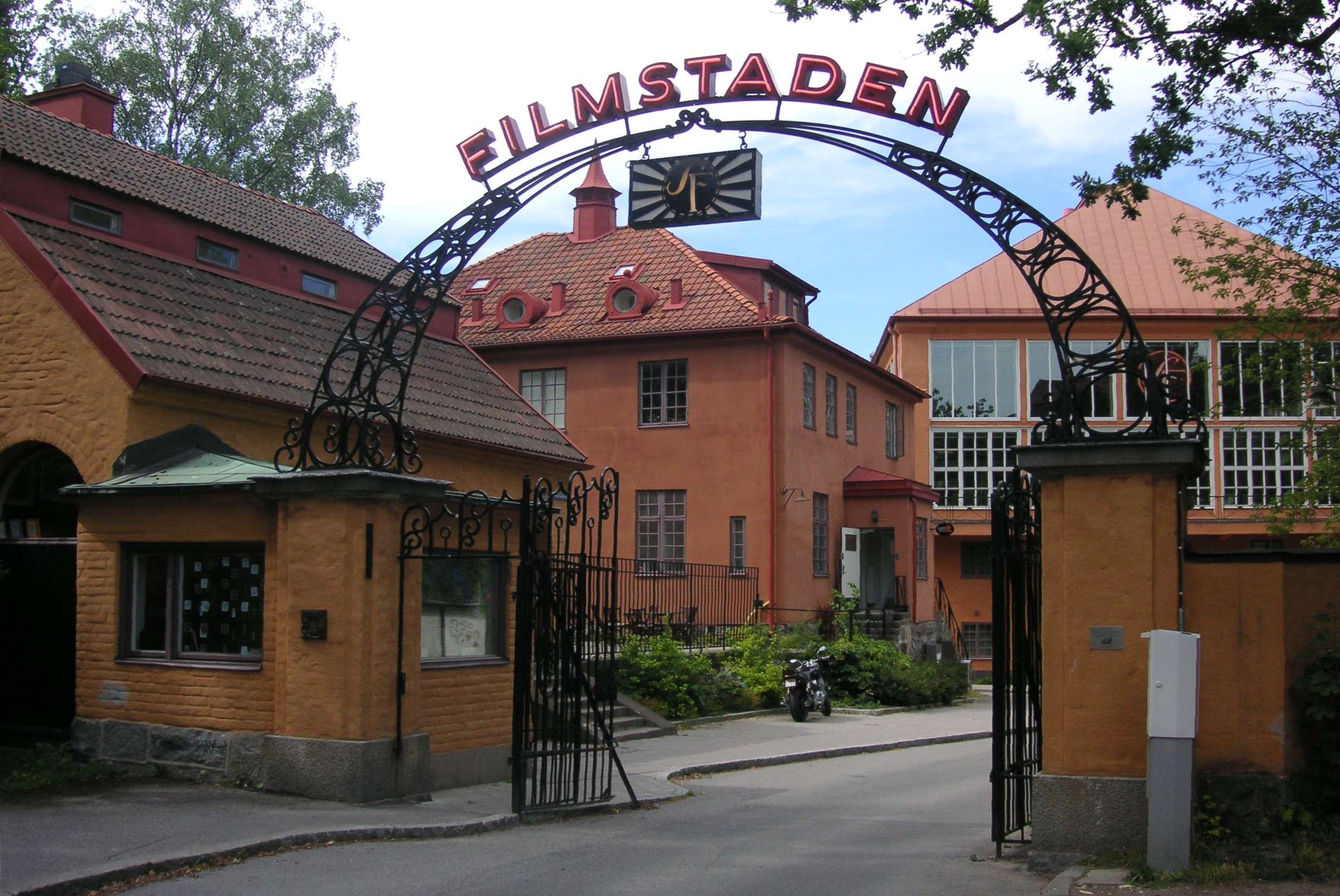
Filmstaden main gate (2008)

Ingmar Bergman originally wrote the play Trämålning (Wood Painting) in 1953 / 1954 for the acting students of Malmö City Theatre. Its first public performance, which he directed, was on radio in 1954. He also directed it on stage in Malmö the next spring, and in the autumn it was staged in Stockholm, directed by Bengt Ekerot, who would later play the character Death in the film version.

In his autobiography, The Magic Lantern, Bergman wrote that "Wood Painting gradually became The Seventh Seal, an uneven film which lies close to my heart, because it was made under difficult circumstances in a surge of vitality and delight." The script for The Seventh Seal was commenced while Bergman was in the Karolinska Hospital in Stockholm recovering from a stomach complaint. It was at first rejected by Carl-Anders Dymling, head of Svensk Filmindustri, and Dymling only gave Bergman the go-ahead for the project after the success at Cannes of Smiles of a Summer Night. Bergman rewrote the script five times and was given a schedule of only thirty-five days and a budget of $150,000. It was to be the seventeenth film he had directed. Recalling his meeting with Dymling, at the 1956 Cannes Film Festival, Bergman wrote:

Then I flew down to see the head of Svensk Filmindustri, Carl Anders Dymling. I found him sitting in a hotel room in Cannes, overexcited and out of control, selling Smiles of a Summer Night dirt cheap to any horse trader who happened to show up. [...] I placed the refused screenplay for The Seventh Seal in his lap and said, 'Now or never, Carl Anders!' He said, 'Sure, sure, but I have to read it first.' 'You must have already read it since you turned it down.' 'That's true, but maybe I didn't read it carefully enough.

—

=== Filming ===
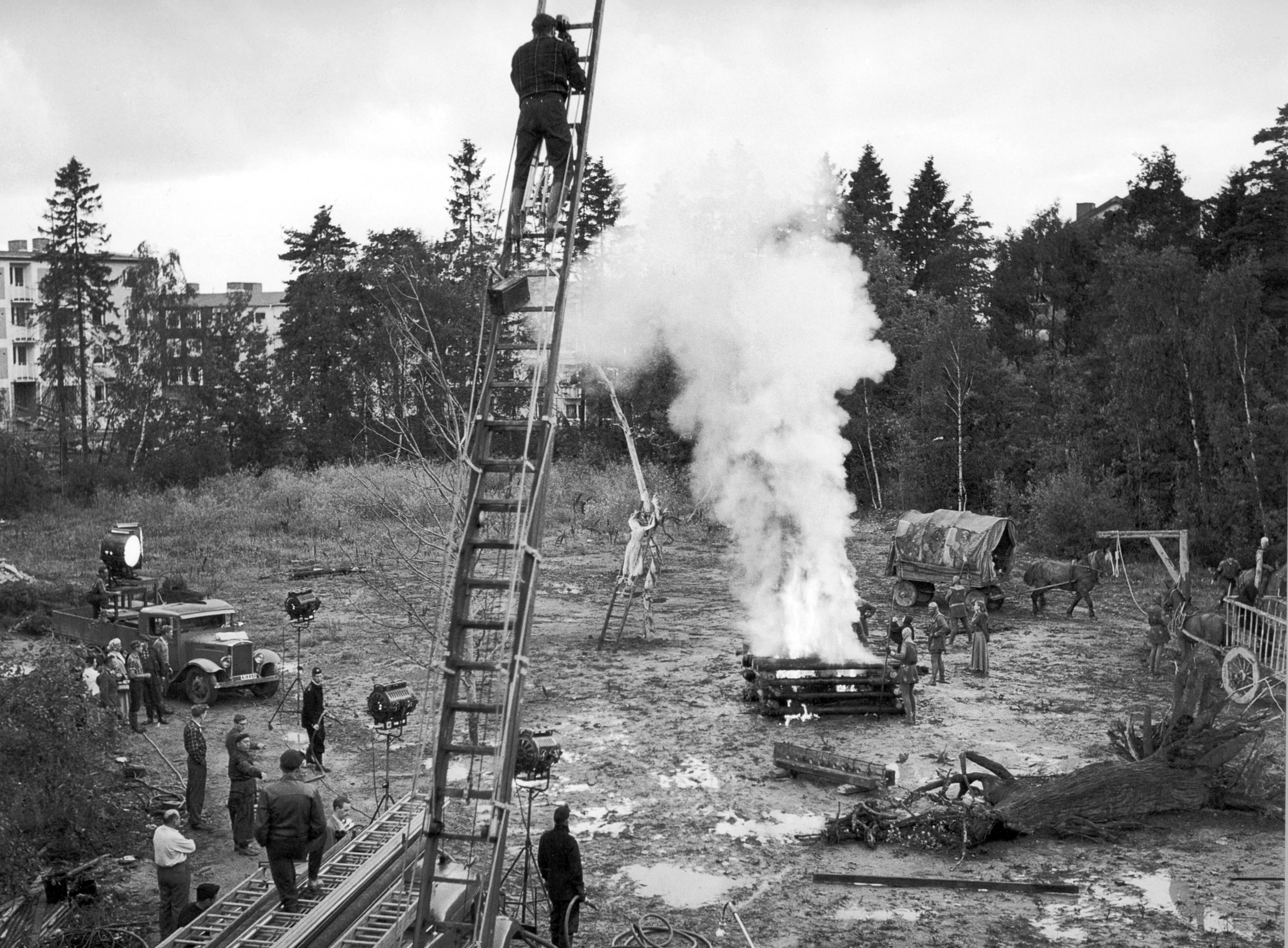
Filming of The Seventh Seal at Filmstaden

All scenes except two were shot in or around the Filmstaden studios in Solna. The exceptions were the famous opening scene with Death and the Knight playing chess by the sea, and the ending with the dance of death, which were both shot at Hovs Hallar, a rocky, precipitous beach area in north-western Scania.

In the Magic Lantern autobiography Bergman writes of the film's iconic penultimate shot: "The image of the Dance of Death beneath the dark cloud was achieved at hectic speed because most of the actors had finished for the day. Assistants, electricians, and a make-up man and about two summer visitors, who never knew what it was all about, had to dress up in the costumes of those condemned to death. A camera with no sound was set up and the picture shot before the cloud dissolved."

== Reception ==
=== Swedish release and reception ===
Upon its original Swedish release, The Seventh Seal was met with a somewhat divided critical response; its cinematography was widely praised, while "Bergman the scriptwriter [was] lambasted." Swedish journalist and critic Nils Beyer, writing for Morgon-tidningen, compared it to Carl Theodor Dreyer's The Passion of Joan of Arc and Day of Wrath. While finding Dreyer's films to be superior, he still noted that "it isn't just any director that you feel like comparing to the old Danish master." He also praised the usage of the cast, in particular Max von Sydow, whose character he described as "a pale, serious Don Quixote character with a face as if sculpted in wood", and "Bibi Andersson, who appears as if painted in faded watercolours but still can emit small delicious glimpses of female warmth." Hanserik Hjertén for Arbetaren started his review by praising the cinematography, but soon went on to describe the film as "a horror film for children" and said that beyond the superficial, it is mostly reminiscent of Bergman's "sophomoric films from the 40s."

=== International reception ===
Bergman's international reputation, on the other hand, was largely cemented by The Seventh Seal. The film ranked 2nd on Cahiers du Cinéma's Top 10 Films of the Year List in 1958. Bosley Crowther had only positive things to say in his 1958 review for The New York Times, and praised how the themes were elevated by the cinematography and performances: "the profundities of the ideas are lightened and made flexible by glowing pictorial presentation of action that is interesting and strong. Mr. Bergman uses his camera and actors for sharp, realistic effects." In 1961, Bergman won the Nastro d'Argento for Director of the Best Foreign Film (Regista del miglior film straniero). Film critic Pauline Kael called it "A magically powerful film."

=== Critical legacy ===
The film is now regarded as a masterpiece of cinema. The Village Voice ranked The Seventh Seal at number 33 in its Top 250 "Best Films of the Century" list in 1999, based on a poll of critics. The film was included in "The New York Times Guide to the Best 1,000 Movies Ever Made" in 2002. Empire magazine, in 2010, ranked it the eighth-greatest film of world cinema. In a poll held by the same magazine, it was voted 335th 'Greatest Movie of All Time' from a list of 500. In addition, on the 100th anniversary of cinema in 1995, the Vatican included The Seventh Seal in its list of its 45 "great films" for its thematic values. The film was included in film critic Roger Ebert's list of "The Great Movies" in 2000. Entertainment Weekly voted it at No. 45 on their list of 100 Greatest Movies of All Time. In 2007, the film was ranked at No. 13 by The Guardian's readers poll on the list of "40 greatest foreign films of all time". Indian film maker Adoor Gopalakrishnan praised the film saying "One can watch 'Seventh Seal' even without subtitles as it is most appealing to the eye."

In January 2002, the film was included on the list of the "Top 100 Essential Films of All Time" by the National Society of Film Critics. In 2012, the film ranked 93rd on critic's poll and 75th on director's poll in Sight & Sound magazine's 100 greatest films of all time list. In the earlier 2002 version of the list the film ranked 35th in critic's poll and 31st in director's poll. In 2022 edition of Sight & Sound's Greatest films of all time list the film ranked 72nd in the director's poll. In 2012 it was voted one of the 25 best Swedish films of all time by a poll of 50 film critics and academics conducted by film magazine FLM. In 2018 the film was ranked 30th in BBC's list of The 100 greatest foreign language films. In 2021 the film was ranked at No. 43 on Time Out magazine's list of The 100 best movies of all time.

The film was selected as the Swedish entry for the Best Foreign Language Film at the 30th Academy Awards, but was not nominated.

On Rotten Tomatoes, the film holds an approval rating of 93% based on 72 reviews, with an average rating of 9.20/10. The website's critical consensus reads: "Narratively bold and visually striking, The Seventh Seal brought Ingmar Bergman to the world stage – and remains every bit as compelling today". On Metacritic, the film has a rating of 88/100 based on 15 reviews, indicating "universal acclaim".

== Influence ==
The Seventh Seal significantly helped Bergman in gaining his position as a world-class director. When the film won the Special Jury Prize at the 1957 Cannes Film Festival, the attention generated by it (along with the previous year's Smiles of a Summer Night) made Bergman and his stars Max von Sydow and Bibi Andersson well known to the European film community, and the critics and readers of Cahiers du Cinéma, among others, discovered him with this movie. Within five years of this, he had established himself as the first real auteur of Swedish cinema. With its images and reflections upon death and the meaning of life, The Seventh Seal had a symbolism according to critic James Monaco that was "immediately apprehensible to people trained in literary culture who were just beginning to discover the 'art' of film, and it quickly became a staple of high school and college literature courses... Unlike Hollywood 'movies,' The Seventh Seal clearly was aware of elite artistic culture and thus was readily appreciated by intellectual audiences."

=== Film and television ===
Bengt Ekerot as Death

The derivative representation of Death as a white-faced man who wears a dark cape and plays chess with mortals has been a popular object of parody in other films and television.

Several films and comedy sketches portray Death as playing games other than or in addition to chess. In the final scene of the 1968 film De Düva (mock Swedish for "The Dove"), a 15-minute pastiche of Bergman's work generally and his Wild Strawberries in particular, the protagonist plays badminton against Death, and wins when the droppings of a passing dove strike Death in the eye. The photography imitates throughout the style of Bergman's cinematographers Sven Nykvist and Gunnar Fischer. The film is also parodied in Bill & Ted's Bogus Journey (1991), with the titular characters meeting Death and challenging him to several contemporary games.

=== Popular music ===
The plot is recapitulated in Scott Walker's "The Seventh Seal" from his album Scott 4.

=== Opera ===
In 2016, composer João MacDowell premiered in New York City at Scandinavia House the music for the first act of The Seventh Seal, a work in progress under contract with the Ingmar Bergman Foundation, sung in Swedish. The work was under production by the International Brazilian Opera (IBOC) as part of the celebrations for the Ingmar Bergman centenary in 2018.

== See also ==
- A Matter of Life and Death (1946 film) § Chess
- Knight of faith
- Middle Ages in film
- Death (personification)
- List of historical drama films
- List of submissions to the 30th Academy Awards for Best Foreign Language Film
- List of Swedish submissions for the Academy Award for Best Foreign Language Film
