= It Rains on Our Love =

1946 film by Ingmar Bergman

- Theatrical release poster
- Directed by: Ingmar Bergman
- Screenplay by: Herbert Grevenius; Ingmar Bergman
- Based on: Bra Mennesker by Oskar Braaten
- Produced by: Lorens Marmstedt
- Starring: Barbro Kollberg; Birger Malmsten
- Cinematography: Göran Strindberg; Hilding Bladh
- Edited by: Tage Holmberg
- Music by: Erland von Koch
- Distributed by: Nordisk Tonefilm
- Release date: 9 November 1946
- Running time: 95 minutes
- Country: Sweden
- Language: Swedish

It Rains on Our Love (Swedish: Det regnar på vår kärlek) is a 1946 Swedish drama film directed by Ingmar Bergman from a screenplay he co-wrote with Herbert Grevenius, based on the Norwegian play Bra Mennesker (Good People) by Oskar Braaten. It Rains on Our Love is the first film directed by Bergman to include actor Gunnar Björnstrand in a credited role (he also had a credited role in Bergman's screenwriting debut Torment (1944). Björnstrand would go on to act in nearly twenty of Bergman's films.

== Plot ==
David Lindell (Birger Malmsten) and Maggi (Barbro Kollberg) have not been lucky. David is a newly-released prisoner who now wants to start a new life. Maggi aspired to be an actress, but got pregnant during a chance encounter and has now fled to a provincial town to give herself a second chance. She meets David at a railway station. They represent everything the straitlaced society rejects. People take advantage of them, the couple is accused of theft, and thrown out of their apartment. That is when a guardian angel appears, in the unlikely form of the “Man with the Umbrella”.

== Cast ==
- Barbro Kollberg as Maggi
- Birger Malmsten as David
- Gösta Cederlund as Man with umbrella
- Ludde Gentzel as Håkansson
- Douglas Håge as Andersson
- Benkt-Åke Benktsson as The Prosecutor
- Sture Ericson as Kängsnöret
- Ulf Johansson as Stålvispen
- Julia Cæsar as Hanna Ledin
- Gunnar Björnstrand as Mr. Purman
- Erik Rosén as The Judge
- Magnus Kesster as Folke Törnberg
- Åke Fridell as Reverend
