= Carl-Olof Anderberg =

Swedish pianist, composer and arranger

Carl-Olof Anderberg (March 13, 1914 – January 4, 1972) was a Swedish pianist, composer and musical arranger. He was born in Stockholm. From 1940, he was married to the actress Lizzie Stein. He died in Malmö.

== Selected works ==
Concertante

- Concerto for viola and orchestra (1945)
- Musical vignettes for Charlotte Löwensköld
- Per Nørgård – Metamorfosi

Film music

- Night in Port (1943)
- Sonja (1943)
- En dag skall gry - 1944 (A Day Shall Dawn)
- Främmande hamn - 1948 (Strange Harbour)
- She Came Like the Wind (1952)
- U-Boat 39 (1952)
- Encounter with Life (1952)
- House of Women (1953)
- Café Lunchrasten (1954)(US title: The Lunch-Break Café)
- Voyage in the Night (1955)
