= Restaurant Intim =

1950 film

- Directed by: Hampe Faustman
- Written by: Olle Länsberg (novel); Arne Sellermark; Hampe Faustman
- Starring: Birger Malmsten; Åke Grönberg; Mimi Nelson
- Cinematography: Bertil Palmgren
- Edited by: Wic Kjellin
- Music by: Erik Baumann; Nathan Görling; Jules Sylvain
- Production company: Europafilm
- Distributed by: Europafilm
- Release date: 3 March 1950
- Running time: 83 minutes
- Country: Sweden
- Language: Swedish

Restaurant Intim is a 1950 Swedish drama film directed by Hampe Faustman and starring Birger Malmsten, Åke Grönberg and Mimi Nelson. It was shot at the Råsunda Studios in Stockholm. The film's sets were designed by the art director Arne Åkermark.

== About the movie ==
The film is based on author Olle Länsberg's novel Restaurant Intim, published in 1945. The film premiered on March 3, 1950, at the Saga cinema on Kungsgatan in Stockholm. The film was shot in studios at AB Europa Studio in Sundbyberg and Filmstaden in Råsunda with exteriors from Restaurant Bellmansro on Djurgården and on board the archipelago boat Express II by Bertil Palmgren. Actor Hugo Jacobson made his last film role in the movie. He died one month after the premiere.

== Cast ==
- Birger Malmsten as Alf Lindholm
- Åke Grönberg as Kalle Söderberg
- Mimi Nelson as Maja, waitress
- Irma Christenson as Ester
- Barbro Nordin as Pyret
- Fritiof Billquist as Bergertz, restaurant manager
- Dagmar Ebbesen as Josefsson
- Georg Skarstedt as Erik 'Hajen' Sehlstedt
- David Erikson as Eriksson, waiter
- Hugo Jacobsson as Andersson, waiter
- Hanny Schedin as Siv, waitress
- Barbro Elfvik as Maj-Britt
- Artur Rolén as Elov, waiter
- Barbro Flodquist as Mortell
- Alf Östlund as Manager Nessing
- Bengt Blomgren as Tage, Ester's husband
- Gösta Holmström as Gustav, Maja's husband
- Märta Arbin as Ester's mother
- Signe Wirff as Mrs. Söderberg, Kalle's mother
- Olav Riégo as Restaurant guest
- Signhild Björkman as Märta, restaurant guest
- Tord Stål as Åkesson, hygiene inspector
- Felix Alvo as Waiter
- Kate Gustin as Waitress
- Solveig Svensson as Waitress
- Monica Weinzierl as Vivi, Ester's daughter

== Bibliography ==
- Qvist, Per Olov & von Bagh, Peter. Guide to the Cinema of Sweden and Finland. Greenwood Publishing Group, 2000.
