= Herbert Grevenius =

Swedish screenwriter

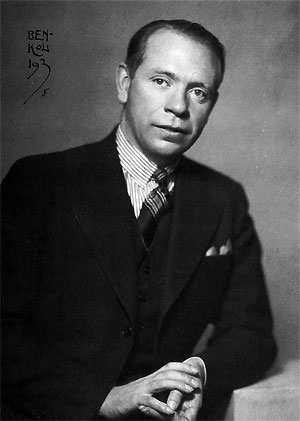
- Born: 7 October 1901
- Died: 9 December 1993 (aged 92)
- Occupation: Screenwriter
- Years active: 1943-1980

Herbert Grevenius (7 October 1901 – 9 December 1993) was a Swedish screenwriter. He wrote screenplays for 30 films between 1943 and 1980.

== Selected filmography ==
- The Old Clock at Ronneberga (1944)
- It Rains on Our Love (1946)
- Främmande hamn (1948)
- Thirst (1949)
- This Can't Happen Here (1950)
- Summer Interlude (1951)
- She Came Like the Wind (1952)
- U-Boat 39 (1952)
- Café Lunchrasten (1954)
- A Little Nest (1956)
- The Girl in Tails (1956)
- Hemsöborna (1966)
