= Krabbe =

Krabbe is a surname, and may refer to:

== People ==
- Anne Krabbe (1552–1618), Danish writer
- Ewa Pihl Krabbe (born 1947), Swedish politician
- Felix Krabbe (born 1978), German yacht racer
- Frederik Krabbe (born 1988), Danish football player
- Frederik Michael Krabbe (1725–1796) Danish shipbuilder
- Gregers Krabbe (1594–1655), Danish-born nobleman and landowner
- Hugo Krabbe (1857–1936), Dutch jurist and legal philosopher
- Iver Krabbe (1602–1666), Danish nobleman and military officer
- Jörgen Krabbe (1633–1678), Danish-Swedish lawyer and nobleman
- Karen Iversdatter Krabbe (1637–1702), Danish noblewoman
- Katrin Krabbe (born 1969), German female athlete
- Knud Krabbe (1885–1961), Danish neurologist
- Niels Krabbe (born 1951), ornithologist and bird conservationist
- Nikolay Karlovich Krabbe (1814–1876), admiral of the Russian Imperial Navy

== See also ==
- Krabbe disease, degenerative disorder that affects the myelin sheath of the nervous system
- Krabbé
