= Bjelfvenstam =

Bjelfvenstam is a given name and surname. Notable people with the name include:

- Björn Bjelfvenstam (born 1929), Swedish actor
- Bo Bjelfvenstam (1924–2025), Swedish actor and film director
