= Iver Krabbe =

Danish nobleman and military officer

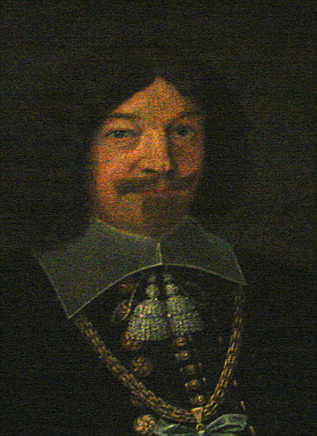
- Born: March 22, 1602; Övedskloster Manor, Scania, Denmark (now Sweden)
- Died: October 30, 1666 (aged 64); Gunderslevholm, Zealand
- Occupation: Military officer
- Children: Jörgen Krabbe Karen Krabbe
- Awards: Knight of the Elephant (1648)

Iver Krabbe (March 22, 1602 – October 30, 1666) was a Danish nobleman, military officer, and governor-general of Norway from 1661 to 1664.

== Biography ==
Iver Krabbe was born at Övedskloster Manor in the province of Scania in eastern Denmark, the son of Tage Krabbe (1553–1612) and Sofie Jørgensdatter Friis (1576–1611). He studied in Orléans and then in Padua in 1625, and returned home in 1628. There he was made a lesser noble at the court, but he left the post on 25 August that year, when he married Karen Ottesdatter Marsvin (1610–1680) at Copenhagen Castle. Over the years, the couple had nine children: two boys and seven girls. In 1629 Iver Krabbe was enfeoffed with Laholm, which he exchanged for Varberg in 1636. In 1636 he became the commander of the union troops in the Duchies of Schleswig and Holstein, and in 1641 he was ordered to inspect Bohus Fortress.

During the war with Sweden, Krabbe held a position of authority. In early February 1645, he received orders to join forces with Hannibal Sehested, who was positioned at Bohus. This did not lead to anything, but then in April 1645 he had a successful engagement against Swedish forces at Kungsbacka. On 27 May of the same year, he was defeated at Landvetter by Swedish forces led by Harald Stake. Shortly afterwards, the Second Treaty of Brömsebro was signed and the province of Halland was pledged to Sweden. With a heavy heart, Krabbe was forced to turn over his fortress to the enemy in September, after having written in vain to Corfitz Ulfeldt to be spared from doing so. The war also affected Krabbe at a more personal level because Swedish forces had burned Jordbjærg Castle (now Jordberga), his property in Scania, to the ground in 1644.

In 1646, Krabbe received Båhuslen county as a replacement for Varberg, he was named a knight at the 1648 coronation of Frederick III of Denmark, and during the following period, he was involved in renovating border fortifications. With the approach of the Second Northern War, in 1657 he was named a major general in charge of southern Norway. He was assigned responsibility for preparing for war, and in April he was called to Copenhagen to confer with Frederick III. During the war itself, however, he was not involved in any major engagements; he was mainly involved in border skirmishes. In September and October 1657 he led a diversion into Halland, but it had to be abandoned because of a lack of provisions and also partly due to lack of support from the Danish army in Scania. In November, he gathered his forces at Uddevalla against a Swedish attack from Vänersborg, but was unable to obtain support from Niels Trolle, the governor-general of Norway at Akershus Fortress. In January 1658, the fortress at Uddevalla also fell. Krabbe soon managed to take it back, but immediately afterwards Båhuslen was lost to Sweden under the Treaty of Roskilde.

Krabbe had thus lost his fief, but his position was shaken even more with the loss of his home province Scania, where his properties at Jordbjærg, Krageholm Castle, and Marsvinsholm Castle were located. He had been Scania's leading nobleman, not only personally but also through his connections with relatives and friends and client-patron relationships. The Swedish government, therefore, made the utmost effort to win him to its side. Even though he had been an ardent foe of the Swedes until then, after the Treaty of Roskilde he took an oath to his new master, as did his youngest son Jørgen and his brother Niels. However, this did not mean that he had withdrawn from Danish service. In September 1660, the Council of State suggested that he should be admitted as a member of the council, but the king did not follow up on the suggestion. Instead, Krabbe received the honor of carrying the blood banner (Danish: blodfanen) at the oath of fealty to Frederick III as hereditary king of Denmark on October 18.

In July 1661, Krabbe made an offer through an intermediary to enter the service of Charles XI of Sweden; however, Frederick III considered it prudent to create stronger links with Krabbe. He was a member of the State College (Danish: Statskollegiet, a governing body overseeing the workings of the government) and the large legal committee, after which he was named governor-general of Norway (Stattholder av Norge) as Niels Trolle's successor. The population in the kingdom complained about him, as they had complained about his predecessor; more significantly, however, he had enemies in Copenhagen. It was expected that he would leave the position in the summer of 1663, but he remained in power until January 1664, when he was replaced by Ulrik Frederik Gyldenløve.

Krabbe died at his estate Gunderslevholm in Zealand on October 30, 1666, and he is buried at Gunderslev Church. He had many grandchildren in both Scania and Denmark, and his daughter Margerete's son Iver Rosenkrantz later became a well-known Danish politician.

== Works cited ==
- Munthe, Carl Oscar (1901). Hannibalsfejden 1644–1645: Den norske hærs bloddåb [Hannibal's feud 1644–1645: The Norwegian army's blood baptism] (in Danish). Oslo: Grøndahl & Søns bogtrykkeri.
