= Felestad Church =

- Felestads kyrka
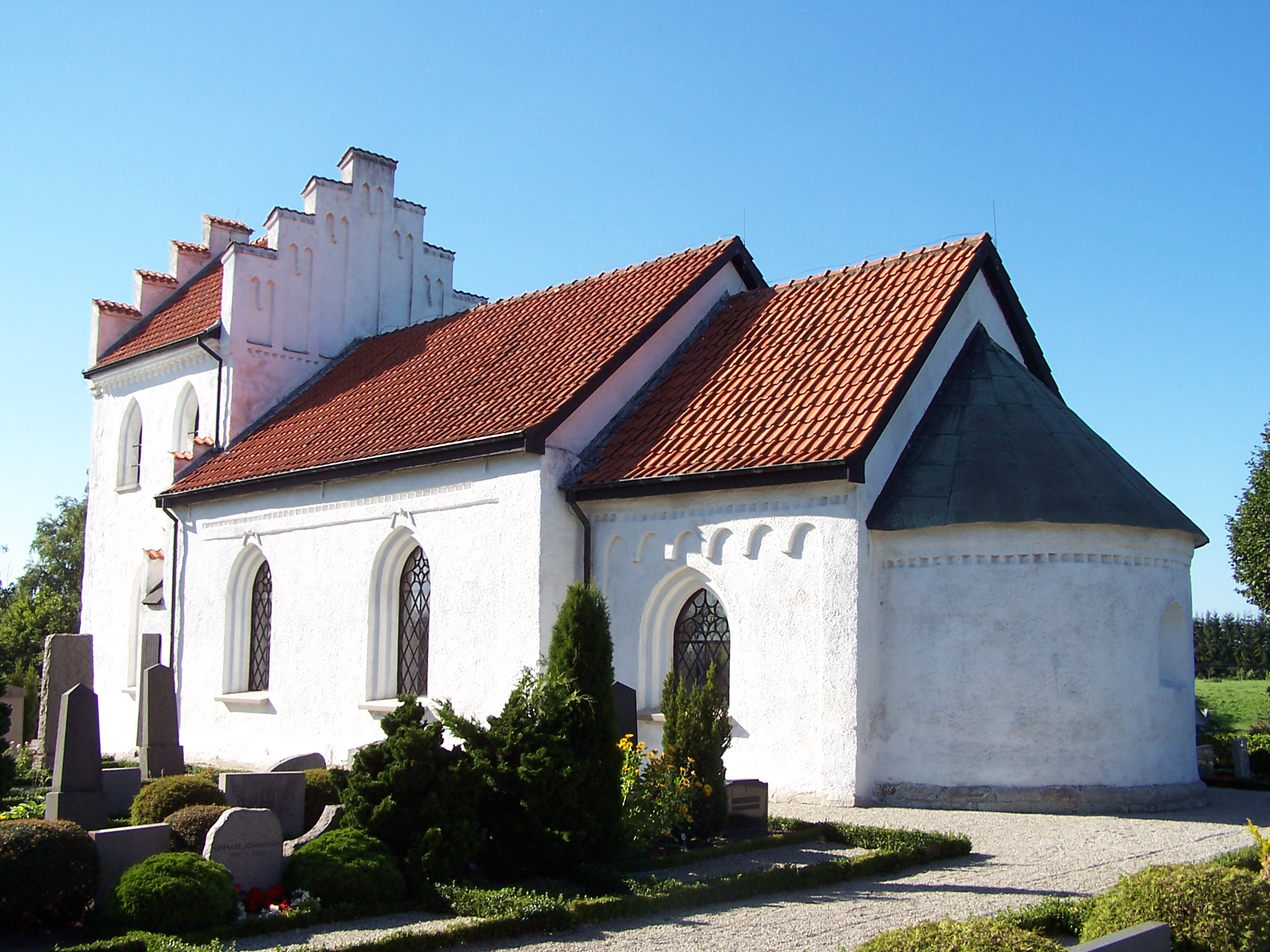
- Felestad Church

- Location within Skåne Location within Sweden
- 55°54′24″N 13°05′41″E
- Country: Sweden
- Denomination: Church of Sweden

Administration
- Diocese: Lund

Felestad Church (Swedish: Felestads kyrka) is a medieval Lutheran church in the outskirts of Svalöv in the province of Scania, Sweden. It belongs to the Diocese of Lund.

== History and architecture ==
Felestad Church is an early Romanesque brick church, erected on a base of fieldstone, sometime between 1180 and 1220. The church was rebuilt during the 15th or 16th century, when an original wooden ceiling was replaced with a vaulted ceiling. The tower, as well as (probably) the present windows, were added in the 19th century during a renovation led by Carl Georg Brunius. The tower replaced an earlier tower which had collapsed in the 17th century. A church porch has also existed but was removed during the 17th century.

The furnishings date mostly from after the Reformation. An exception is the baptismal font which is from the 12th century and probably made on Gotland. The pulpit is from 1601, donated by the Brahe family of Krageholm Castle. The pews date from the 18th century and have been altered during the 20th century. A few medieval murals have been preserved in the wall of the apse.
