= Karen Iversdatter Krabbe =

Danish noblewoman

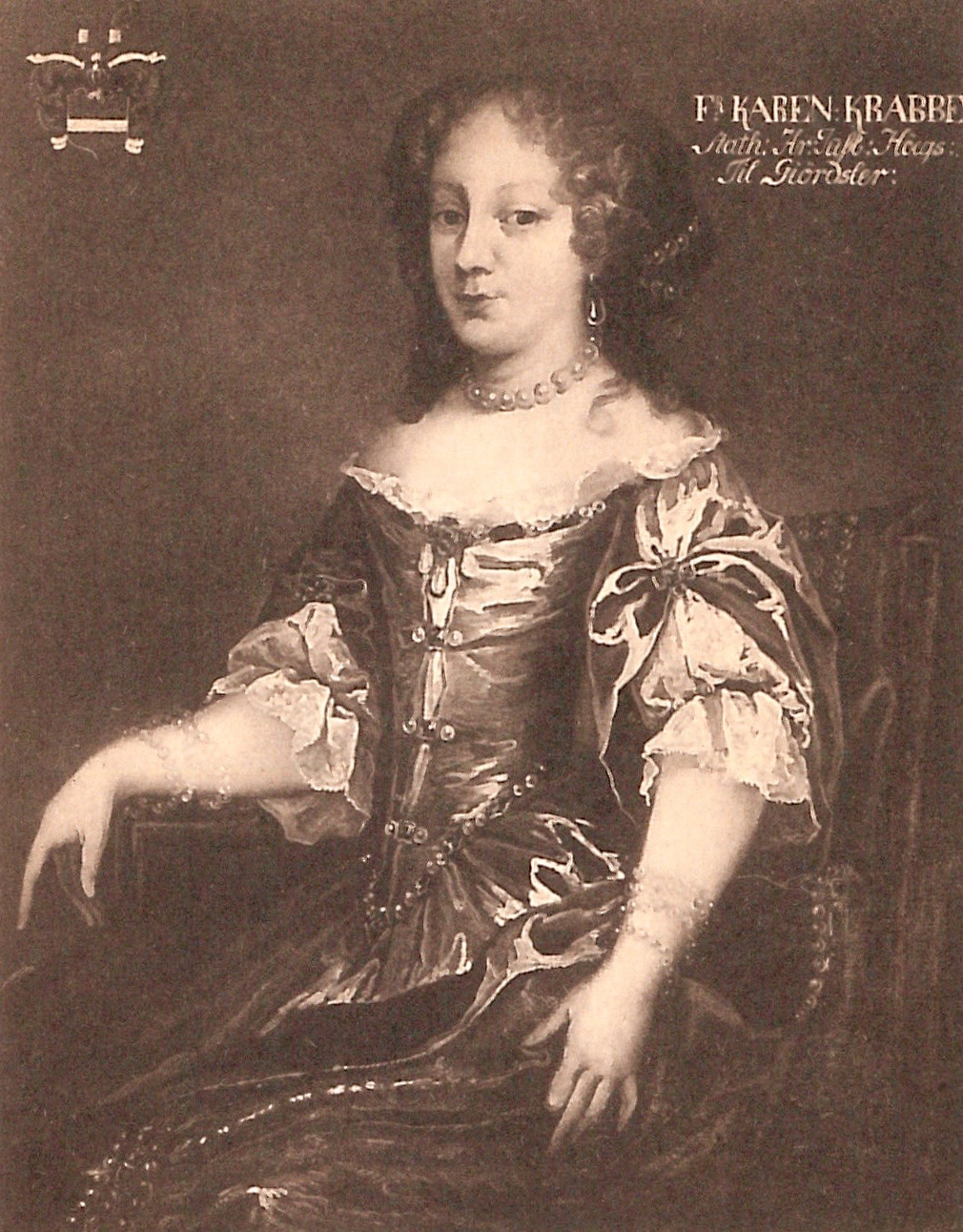
Karen Krabbe

Karen Iversdatter Krabbe (1637-1702) was a Danish noblewoman who played an important role behind the scenes during the peace negotiations at Nijmegen in 1677-1679 and later as wife of the governor of Norway. She moved in the circles of Colbert and Bengt Oxenstierna and worked actively for the sake of Denmark during the Scanian War.She owned Fulltofta Castle in Scania until 1678.

== Childhood ==
Karen was born on 19 November 1637, in the fortress of Varberg in eastern Denmark. Her father Iver Krabbe was the castle commander and later governor of Norway - a well-known military man and politician who was close friends with the king. Iver's ancestral home, Jordebjerg (now Jordberga), was situated in the province of Scania, just across the Sound from Copenhagen, and the family identified as Scanian and spoke the Scanian dialect, although they moved a lot. Karen's mother, Karen Marsvin (1610-1680), came from an old aristocratic family in southern Scania where they owned the magnificent castle of Dybäck.

== Horn's War 1643-45 and following years ==
In 1644, Karen was seven years old and had five older siblings and two younger. Her favourite brother Jörgen was eleven and had already been sent to boarding school at Sorø Akademi in Zealand. The Thirty Years' War was still going on at the time, and the Swedes had invaded both Jutland and Scania. During the fighting, Jordberga Castle burnt down. According to legend, Iver Krabbe reached the estate too late, lifted his fist towards the sky and swore vengeance on the Swedish dogs. The Krabbe family moved around Denmark, depending on Iver's military postings, one year in Holstein, the next in Zealand, and then Norway. They were one of the most pious families in Denmark, with Karen Marsvin making a name for herself as keen to pay to get the right clergyman in the proper position but just as eager to pay for poorhouses and hospitals. During these years, two of Karen's sisters died from an 'intense fever'. Girls weren't allowed to go to school in Denmark back then. Some very fortunate girls, like Princess Leonora Christina, were sent to school in Holland and France, but there were no such institutions in Scandinavia. The Krabbe girls might have received instruction at home, though.

== The Karl Gustav Wars ==
In 1657, when Karen was twenty, war broke out again. Karen's father set out with the army to defend the country, her eldest brother Tage joined a regiment and Jörgen got stuck in Copenhagen that was besieged by the Swedes. Karen and her mother and sisters hid with their relatives in the countryside. This time, Denmark lost. At first, the Swedes demanded that they be given the whole of Norway, but in the end, they made good with the considerably smaller Scanian provinces. The Krabbe family considered moving to Zealand, but in the end, all of them except Tage decided to become Swedish citizens. At this time, Iver split his properties between the children. Tage received Gunderslev Castle in Zealand, Margarete their part of Castle Dybäck, Karen a castle in central Scania called Fuldtofte (now Fulltofta).

== Marriage ==
On 23 July 1670, Karen married a nobleman and diplomat named Just Høg, who was three years her junior. They got married in Copenhagen. We don't know if she chose him or if it was upon her father's or brothers' advice. Just Høg made a name for himself in international politics and was well known at the court of Louis XIV, the Sun King. Karen travelled with him around Europe and spent the holidays at either Fuldtofte or her husband's lands in Zealand. Karen left Fuldtofte in Jörgen's hands, and at one point, she wanted him to sell it for her, but the Swede who bought it, Niclas Jonsson Cronacker, refused to pay because the furniture wasn't as nice as he had expected. Jörgen went to court on Karen's behalf and won the case, and he then continued to run the estate for her. The Krabbe-Høgs remained childless, and we know it was not by choice: Karen suffered a miscarriage shortly after her brother Jörgen's death in 1678.

== The Scanian War ==
In 1675, war broke out again. Scania was the main war theatre. Karen was far from the fighting, though: her husband was sent to France and Holland to represent Denmark at the peace negotiations and she did her best to speak up for Denmark. The Swedish ambassador, Bengt Oxenstierna, was highly annoyed because she went around Paris handing out pamphlets and books about the annexation of Scania that depicted the Swedes negatively. Karen Krabbe also made friends with Madame Colbert, wife of the French Prime Minister, and tried to influence the circles around the Colberts in Denmark's favour.

In the winter of 1676, Karen's eldest brother Tage died from a sudden illness.

In September 1677, Jörgen was arrested by the Swedes on the charge of high treason. He was suspected of having helped the local resistance movement and of having spoken about the Swedish king 'in an offensive manner'. Karen Krabbe now frantically tried to help her brother. She went around all of Paris asking the most influential people for help, and she contacted the press and handed out even more books about what was happening in Scania. The Swedish spies wrote to King Carl XI that "Krabbe's sister" was making the Swedes unpopular in the whole of Europe, spreading horrid pamphlets about them that portrayed them as "devils".

In January 1678, Jörgen Krabbe was executed by a firing squad in Malmö. One of the charges against him was that he'd 'subtracted Fulltofta Castle' from a native Swede. Karen's castle was now confiscated by the state and given for free to the man who'd first wanted to buy it but wasn't happy with the furniture. From then on and for the rest of her life, Karen Krabbe refused to be in the same room as a Swede. The only exception was the Swedish diplomat Johan Olivekrantz, who had visited her brother in prison and had tried to intercede in his favour with the Swedish king. Karen never returned to Scania again. Her mother was devastated by the loss of her two sons and died as a refugee in Copenhagen in 1680.

== Governor's Wife in Norway ==
After the Scanian War and Denmark's failed attempt to reconquer its lost lands, Karen and Just moved to Norway, where Just took over Karen's father's old job as governor. They lived in a huge house called Garmannagården in Christiania (now Oslo) that still stands there. After the Scanian War, Karen never took up politics again but dedicated herself to the church. In 1680, Just Høg sued Jörgen Krabbe's widow for the money for Fuldtofte Castle. We don't know what part Karen played because it was all under her husband's name. The Swedish government recognised Høg's claim, and Jytte Thott had to hand over her own home Tosterup to Just Høg in compensation. Høg then sold it to the governor-general of Scania, Rutger von Ascheberg. As in many cases back then, the women's role remains utterly unclear.

Karen died in Oslo on 8 December 1702 and is buried in the cathedral there, together with her husband who died in 1694
