= Circassian ambush near Anapa =

1809 engagement of the Russo-Circassian War

- Part of Russo-Circassian War
Date	18 August 1809
Location	Anapa, Circassia
Result	Circassian victory

Belligerents
Russian Empire	Circassia

Commanders and leaders
(Russia) Nikolai Markovich Vityaz (DOW)	Unknown

Strength
~18,000 soldiers (according to Ottoman report)	Unknown

Casualties and losses
Entire unit allegedly destroyed	Unknown

The Circassian ambush near Anapa was a military engagement between Circassians and the Russian Empire that occurred in 1809 near the strategic Anapa fortress, during the early stages of the Russo-Circassian War. According to an official Ottoman report, Circassian forces successfully ambushed and annihilated a large Russian detachment in a mountain gorge near Anapa.

== Background ==
In 1809, Anapa was under the control of the Ottoman Empire and served as a key fortress and supply base for the Circassian resistance against Russian expansion. As the Russians advanced, the Ottomans sought to reinforce the region, dispatching artillery and troops from Sinop. However, their arrival was delayed due to internal unrest.

== Battle ==
According to an Ottoman intelligence report dated 1227 AH (1812/1813 CE), Circassian forces set a tactical ambush by luring approximately 18,000 Russian troops into a narrow gorge near Anapa. Once the Russians entered the confined terrain, the Circassian fighters launched a coordinated and intense attack, resulting in the reported destruction of the entire Russian unit.

Initially, the victory was attributed to the Abaza people, but further clarification from an Ottoman field commander later confirmed that Circassian forces, including various Circassian tribes, were responsible for the success.

=== Russian Version ===
According to Russian sources, on 18 August 1809, a detachment of 145 Black Sea Cossacks under Yesaul Krivosheya moved toward Anapa from Burgas. Due to the threat of ambush, General Panchulidzev dispatched two companies of the 22nd Jäger Regiment with artillery and about 30 Cossacks under Major Vityaz I.

By 7 a.m., large Circassian forces were spotted nearby, and skirmishes began. Panchulidzev sent reinforcements under Lieutenant Colonel Krabbe, including an infantry battalion, two cannons, and a “considerable number” of Don Cossacks.

The Russian forces were ambushed near a gorge by two Circassian units, reportedly led by the Pasha of Anapa and supported by Ottoman cannons. The smaller unit struck the infantry, while the larger force attacked Krivosheya’s Cossacks, who dismounted and formed a defensive line while retreating toward Vityaz.

Major Vityaz counterattacked with a bayonet charge and joined forces with Krivosheya around noon. Surrounded by 4,000 Circassians and under heavy canister shot fire, the Russian troops held out for two hours. Despite the heavy casualties, including most of the officers, Major Vityaz continued to command the defense while severely wounded.

Russian forces held their ground until reinforcements arrived, at which point the Circassians retreated deeper into the mountains.

== Aftermath ==
The battle was regarded as a significant victory by the Circassian and Ottoman sides. The Ottoman report expressed optimism that the victory would inspire further resistance and demoralize Russian forces. However, despite the Russian tactical withdrawal, they regained control of the region following reinforcements, and the overall campaign continued in favor of the Russian Empire.

=== Russian Version ===
Lieutenant Colonel Krabbe, upon hearing the sounds of battle, advanced rapidly to support Major Vityaz's detachment. Upon arrival, his troops opened heavy fire on the advancing Circassians, forcing them to retreat and occupy the heights along the road.

After joining forces with Vityaz, Krabbe ordered an immediate counterattack. Observing this maneuver, the Circassians fired several rounds from their artillery before retreating further into the mountains. Following the engagement, Russian forces returned to the fortress in Anapa, claiming a victorious withdrawal despite the heavy losses.

== Literature ==
- Веселовский Н. И. «Военно-исторический очерк города Анапы» Archived 2007-09-09 at the Wayback Machine / Н. И. Веселовский. - СПб., 1995 г.;
- Короленко П. П. «Предки Кубанскихъ казаковъ на Днѣпрѣ», 1900 г.;
- Новицкий В. «Анапа и закубанские поселения. Ландшафт, этнографические и исторические процессы на Северном Кавказе в XIX – начале XX века». Нальчик. 2004 г.;
- Потто В. А. «Кавказская война в отдельных очерках, эпизодах, легендах и биографиях». Том 1. «От древнейших времён до Ермолова», 1899 г. Издательство: Кавказский край, 1994 г.
