= Battle of Landvetter =

Part of the Torstenson War

- Part of the Torstenson War
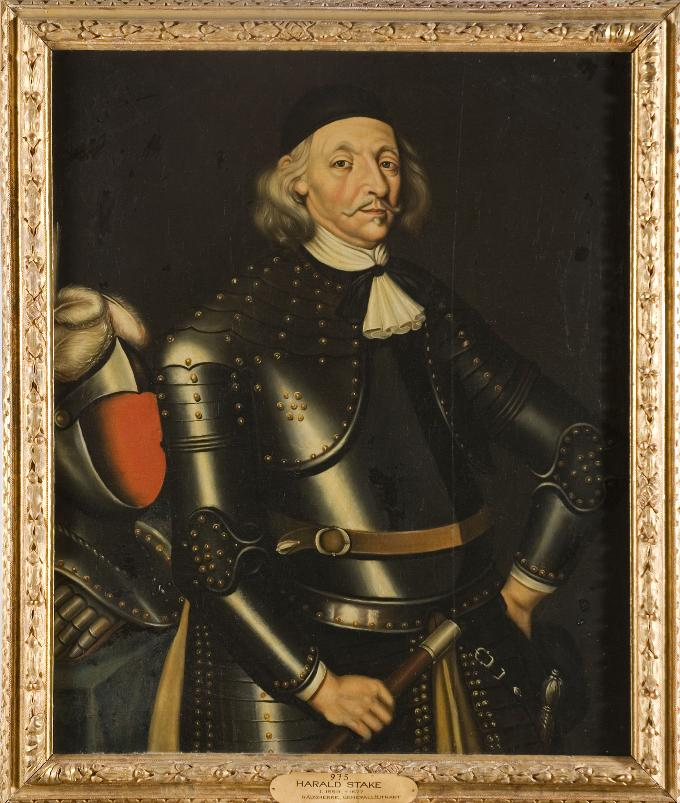
- Anonymous painting of Harald Stake from the 17th-century
Date	27 May 1645
Location	Landvetter, Västergötland, Sweden 57°41′N 12°12′E
Result	Swedish victory
Territorial changes	Danish forces withdraw into Halland

Belligerents
(yes) Swedish Empire	Denmark–Norway

Commanders and leaders
(yes) Harald Stake (yes) Saltzburg	Iver Krabbe

Units involved
(yes) 4 cavalry companies	6 cavalry companies 3 dragoon companies

Strength
Unknown	Unknown

Casualties and losses
A "good number" killed or captured Several standards	Disputed troop casualties (Note: According to Carl Oscar Munthe, several officers and soldiers were killed, with others being captured, while Vilhelm Vessberg says that both sides suffered equal casualties.); One standard

The battle of Landvetter (Note: Danish: kampen ved Landvetter; Swedish: striden vid Landvetter) occurred on 27 May 1645 during the Torstenson War between Denmark and Sweden.

On 25 May, a Danish force led by Iver Krabbe crossed the Viskan, with the objective of marching to Bohus. Upon crossing, following information of the Swedes concentrating forces in Scania, and a significant Dutch fleet heading to Scania, the infantry in the detachment was sent to Varberg while Krabbe and the cavalry continued toward Bohus.

At Landvetter, he was halted by Swedish forces led by Harald Stake, who defeated Krabbe and forced him to retreat into Halland.

== Background ==
On 13 December 1643, after months of preparation by Axel Oxenstierna, a Swedish army of 16,000 men invaded Holstein under the command of Lennart Torstensson. The invasion sparked the eponymous Torstenson War between Denmark and Sweden.

=== Prelude ===
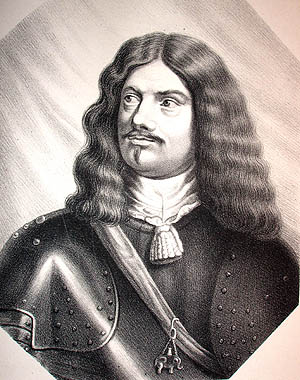
Portrait of Hannibal Sehested by Jens Peter Trap

In May 1645, to support the Danish expedition to Gothenburg, Hannibal Sehested requested that Niels Tagesen Krabbe, governor of Halmstad, assemble 400 men from the companies stationed in Halmstad. These men were then to be sent north of Varberg, led by Lieutenant Colonel Patrick Dumbar. They were only able to depart on 24 May as they needed time to arrange ammunition and provisions for the detachment. The force numbered 1,200 men in total. The troops from Halmstad ended up not partaking in the expedition.

Soon, Ove Gjedde believed it would be best to end the expedition, as he feared the Danish fleet could be trapped in the Göta älv. Following this, Sehested handed over command of the detachment to Iver Krabbe and ordered him to march to Bohus.

After crossing the Viskan and reaching Veddige parish on 25 May, Krabbe received intelligence that Sweden was concentrating forces in Scania and that a significant Dutch fleet with thousands of men was heading toward Scania as well. Following a council of war, the detachment's infantry was sent back to Varberg while the cavalry continued to Bohus. Following the departure of the infantry, the Danish force consisted of six cavalry companies and three dragoon companies.

== Battle ==
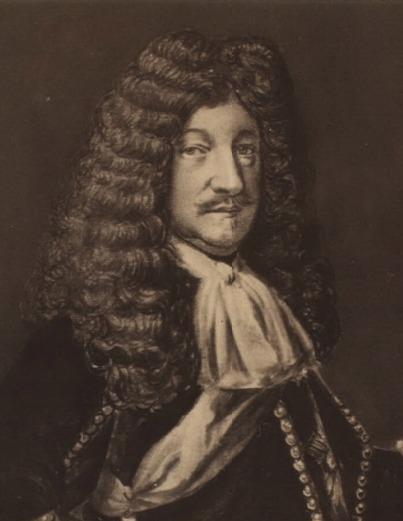
Anonymous portrait of Krabbe

At Landvetter, Krabbe's force was stopped by Colonel Harald Stake, who was stationed there with four companies of cavalry. Conscripted troops commanded by Colonel Saltzburg also likely partook on the Swedish side. The fighting was fierce, lasting from sunrise to noon.

According to Sehested, "a good number" of Swedish non-commissioned officers were killed or captured during the fighting, and several standards were captured as well. Exact troop casualties suffered by the Danes is disputed, though they lost one standard. Their entire baggage train was also captured by the Swedes early in the fighting as the captain entrusted with it had been "negligent". The baggage train contained the entire Danish operational plan and forced Krabbe to make changes to the dispositions he had previously made.

== Aftermath ==
Eventually, Krabbe was forced to retreat to Kungsbacka in Halland. His retreat was reportedly in good order. The Danish defeat was not decisive, as the Swedes believed the Danish cavalry would attempt another advance to Bohus.

At Kungsbacka, command of the Danish detachment was handed over to Lieutenant Colonel Fircks, who remained in northern Halland, taking up a position at Torp from 8 June.
