= Tolken =

Lake in Ulricehamn Municipality, Sweden

- Location within Västra Götaland
- Location: Ulricehamn
- Coordinates: 57°47′N 13°15′E
- Primary outflows: Viskan
- Basin countries: Sweden

Lake Tolken (Swedish pronunciation: [ˈtɔ̌lːkɛn]) is the source of the Swedish river Viskan. It is located west of Ulricehamn. Ruins of Sundholmen Castle are located on one of lake's islands.
