= Övedskloster Manor =

Building in Sjöbo Municipality, Skåne County, Sweden

- Övedskloster slott
- Sjöbo Municipality
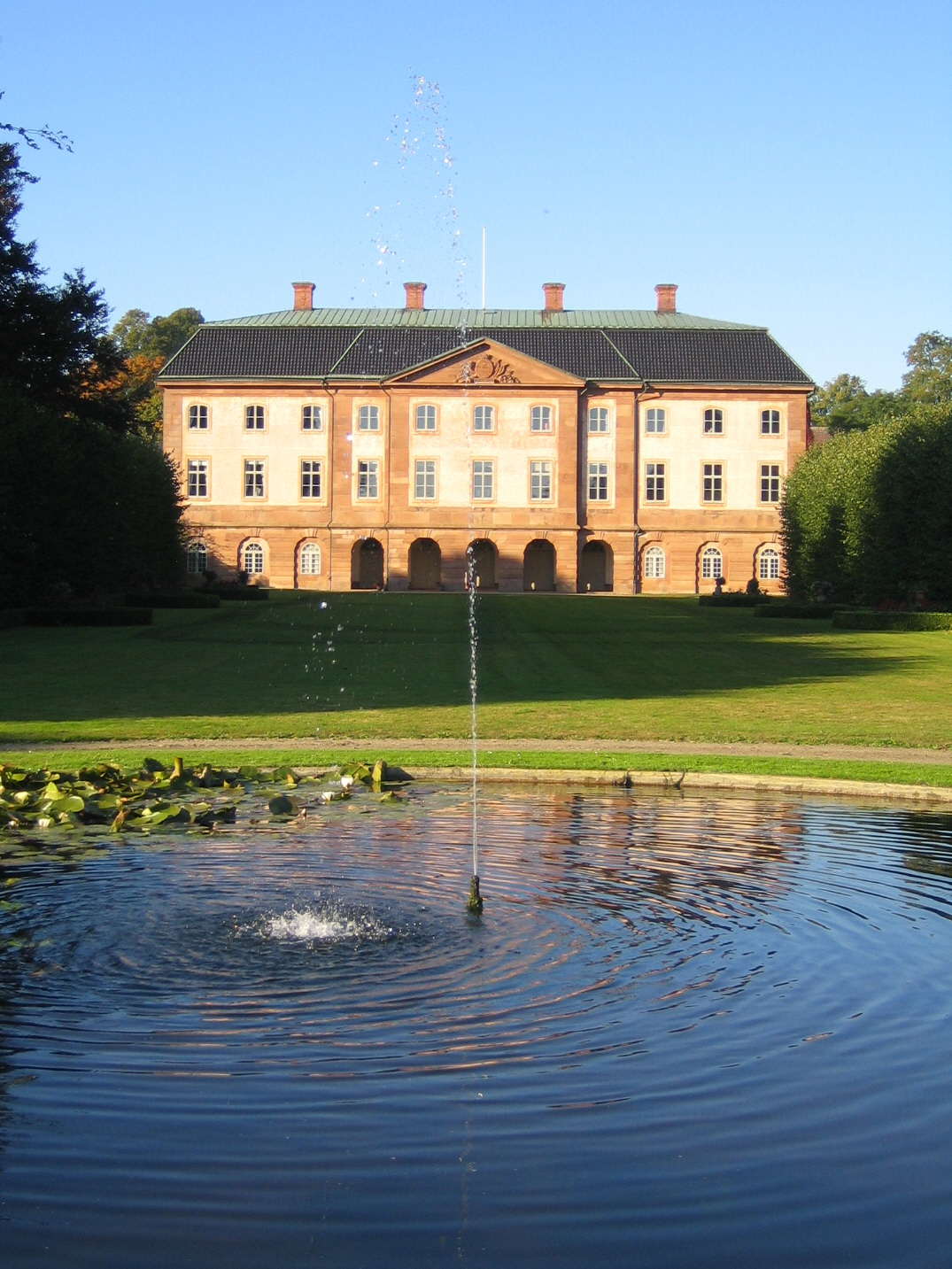
- Övedskloster Manor, view from the park

Site information
- Type: Manor house
- Open to the public: By appointment

Location
- Location in Scania, Sweden Övedskloster Manor (Sweden)
- Coordinates: 55.6864°N 13.6357°E

Site history
- Built: 1769–1776; 250 years ago
- Built by: Hans Ramel (1724–1799)

Övedskloster Manor (Swedish: Övedskloster slott) is a manor in Sjöbo Municipality, Scania, in southern Sweden.

== History ==
=== Early history ===
Övedskloster derives its name (Swedish: The monastery of Öved) from a Premonstratensian abbey, founded in the 12th century by the archbishop of Lund, Eskil of Lund, on the site of the present manor. Little is known about the abbey, and there are no visible remains. It was confiscated by the Danish Crown (as the province of Scania was a part of Denmark until the Treaty of Roskilde in 1658) during the Reformation and subsequently turned into a profitable estate, which changed owners several times during the 16th century. A fire sometime after 1594 probably ruined most of the monastic buildings, while others during this time were converted into barns and other outbuildings. Several of the first landowners also did not live at Övedskloster, which was merely used as a profitable source of income. Furthermore, the frequent wars between Sweden and Denmark during the 17th century discouraged any building activity. The monastery therefore relatively quickly fell into disrepair. Still, from a drawing made in the 1680s it is clear that the walls of the former church were still standing at a considerable height, and some of the monastic buildings were intact. During the early 18th century, the estate probably stayed more or less the same way.

=== Reconstruction ===
In 1753, the estate was sold to Hans Ramel (1724–1799), landowner and member of the Swedish nobility. His wife Amalia Beata Lewenhaupt was born at Övedskloster estate. Hans Ramel was responsible for the complete reconstruction of the manor ensemble, creating the palatial manor house seen today.

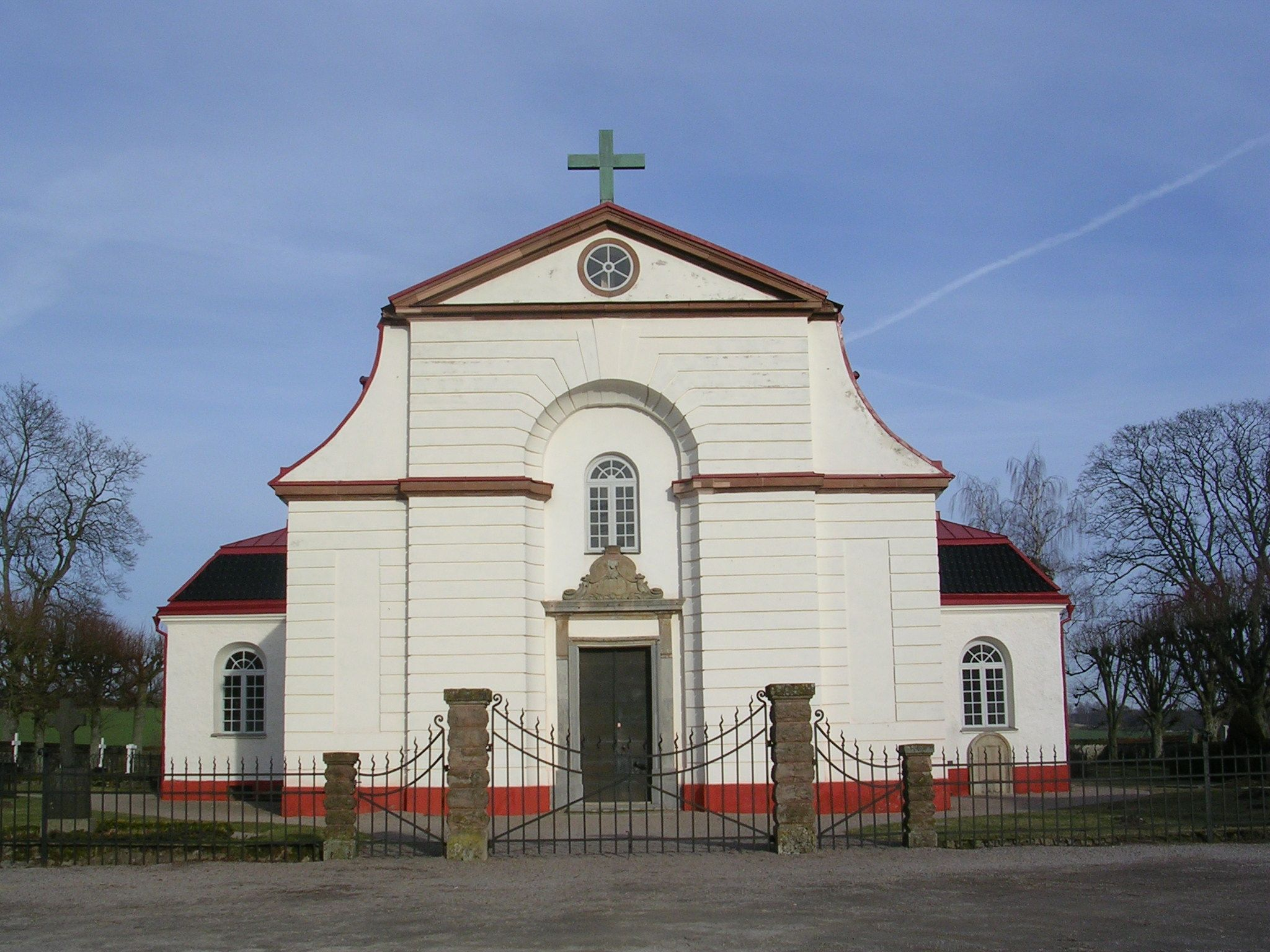
Öved parish church was the first part of the reconstruction scheme by Hårleman to be executed (built 1759–1761)

Plans had already been made to reconstruct the manor before Hans Ramel assumed ownership. Sometime before 1753 architect Carl Hårleman had produced blueprints for a new manor, as well as a general plan for the park, a new parish church and outbuildings. These plans were largely followed in the ensuing reconstruction, which didn't start until 1759. The first part of the rebuilding scheme was the replacing of the neglected parish church near the manor with a Rococo church, built in 1759–1761.

Partly in accordance with the general plan for remaking the grounds of the estate, and partly out of necessity for transport to the building site, new roads were constructed at about the same time. Several new, straight roads leading up to the manor, planted with linden trees and in several places raised on stone causeways (some of these more than 500 metres (1,600 ft) long and 4 metres (13 ft) high) were constructed. The manpower needed to construct these new roads almost equaled what was needed to create the manor house itself, and they still dominate the surrounding cultural landscape.

A garden, dating from the time of the monastery and later expanded, already existed on the site. The plan by Hårleman intended to expand the garden and the park in a style made fashionable through the French landscape architect André Le Nôtre. These plans were only partially carried out; as fashions changed, room was made also for an English landscape garden. The manor house itself and its wings were not erected until 1769 – 1776. Externally, Hårleman's plans were respected, but as the Rococo ideals had started to give way to the Neoclassical ideals of the Gustavian era, the layout of the interior was reworked by Jean Eric Rehn.

The combined artistic skill of Carl Hårleman and Jean Eric Rehn created what is arguably one of the most accomplished 18th-century architectural ensembles in Sweden. When King Gustav III at one point visited the manor, he is rumoured to have exclaimed, Trop royal pour un particulier!, French for Too royal for an ordinary citizen!

The manor house and its surroundings have remained practically unchanged since its construction. It is still the private property of the Ramel family; the current owner is the tenth in line, and also named Hans Ramel.

== Architecture ==
The north façade of the main building faces an 85 metres (279 ft) long courtyard flanked by two long wings and ending in a low gate. On this side the façade is two storeys high, marked by pilasters in local red sandstone and a mansard roof. The wings, designed to house various outhouses used in the practical running of the estate (such as stables), are designed as rusticated, whitewashed pavilions. Towards the garden side, which lies lower than the courtyard, the manor has three storeys, the lower of which opens up towards the garden with large French windows.

Inside, Jean Eric Rehn created sumptuously decorated rooms, complete with furniture which according to Hans Ramel's last will from 1792 must never be sold. It includes furniture made by master cabinet maker Georg Haupt, sculptures by Johan Tobias Sergel and Johan Niclas Byström, and paintings by Niclas Lafrensen, Carl Gustaf Pilo, Per Krafft the Elder and Alexander Roslin, among others. In addition, most of the rooms have artistically executed cocklestoves, wooden floors and rich decoration. The manor also houses a large and varied collection of objets d'art.

== Gallery ==
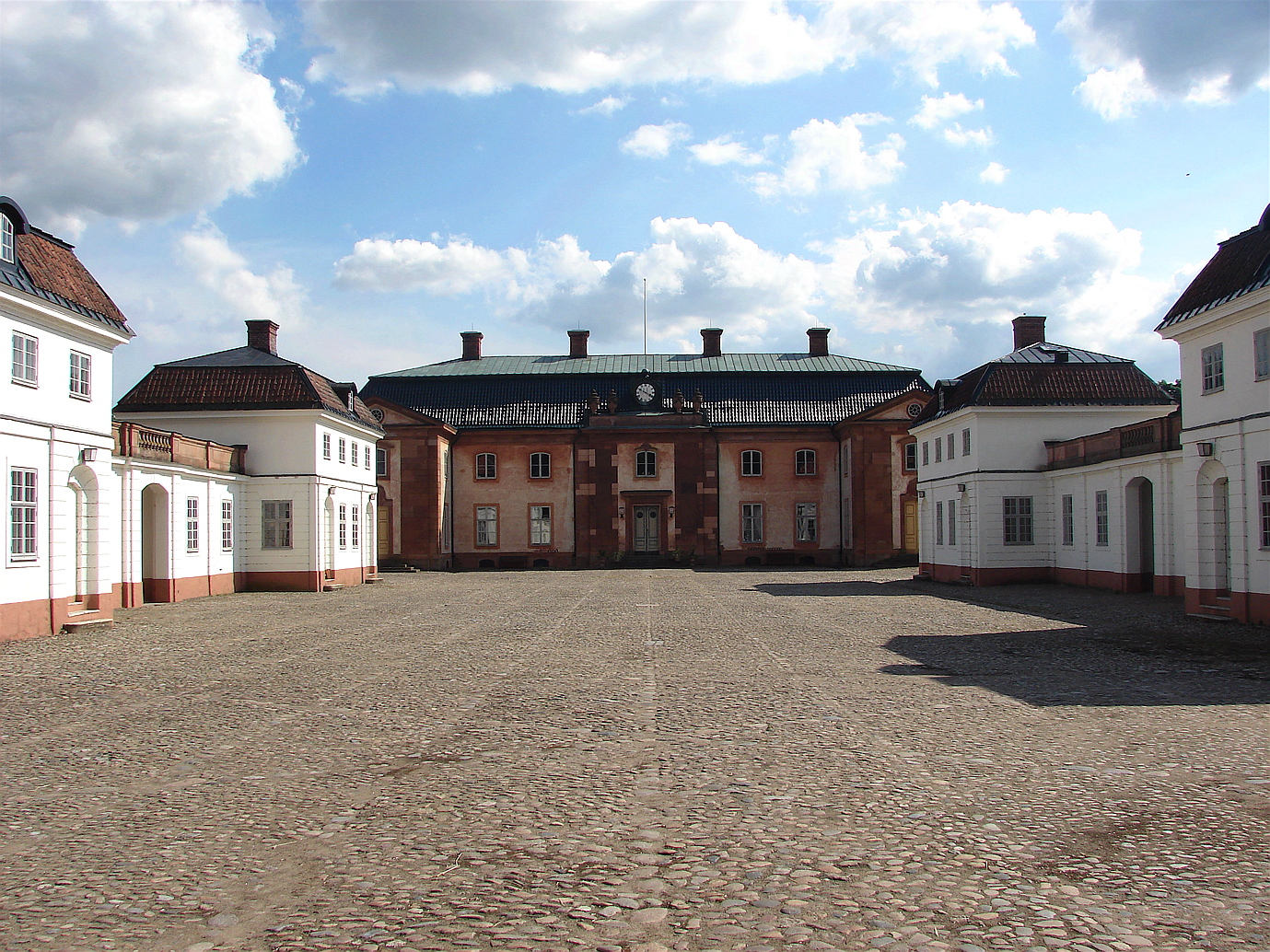
View of the courtyard towards the south

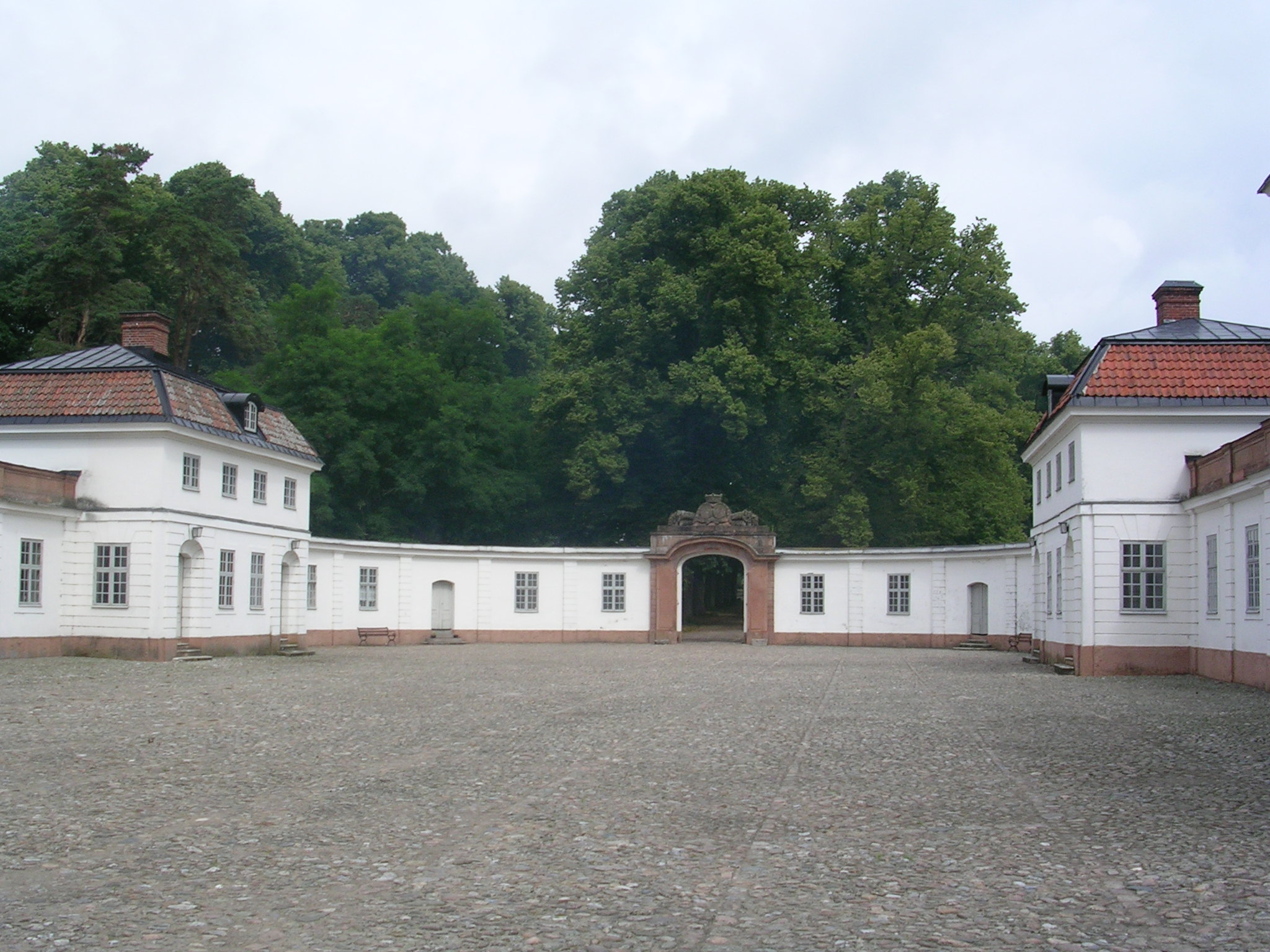
View of the courtyard towards the north

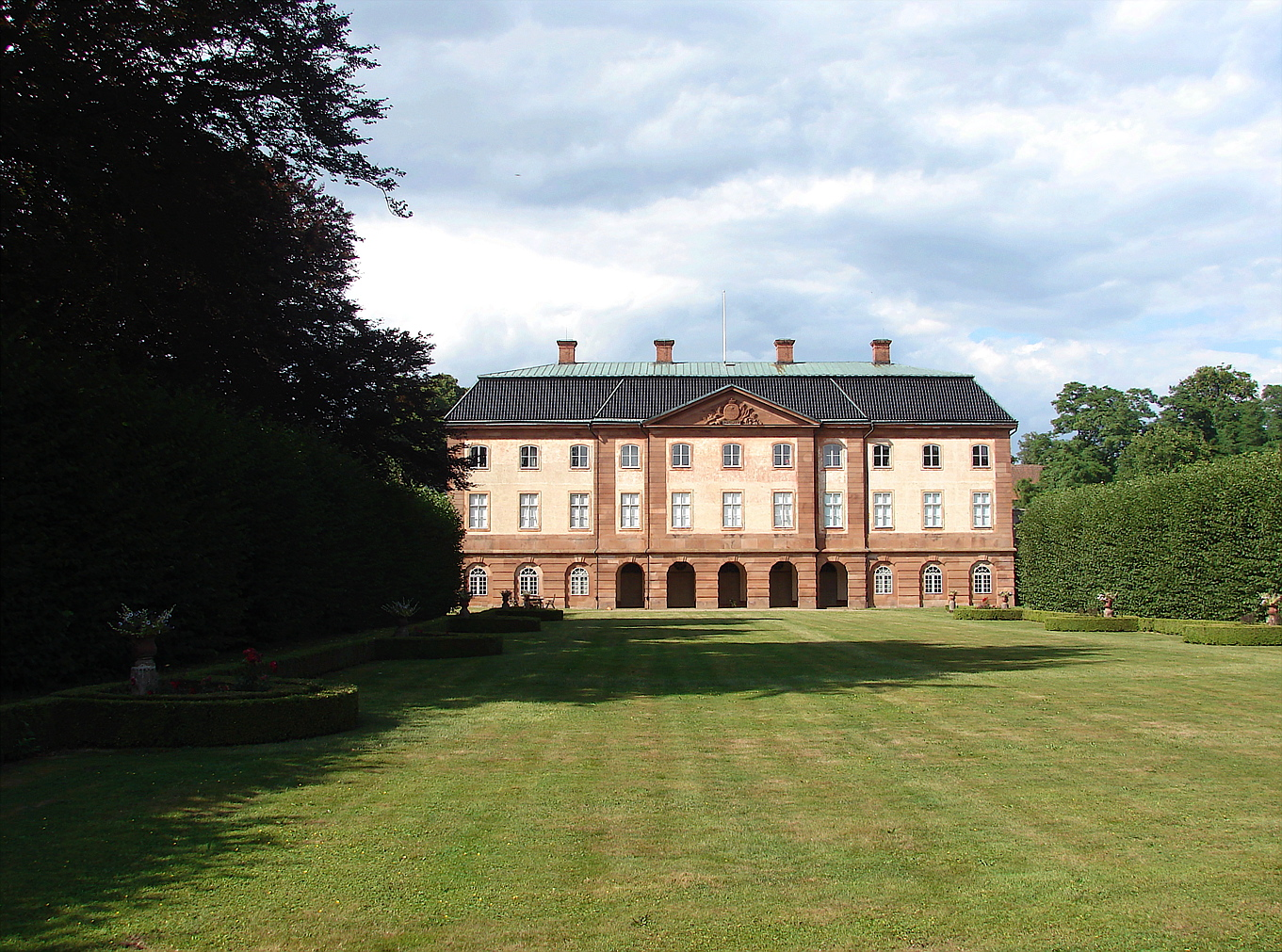
View from the garden

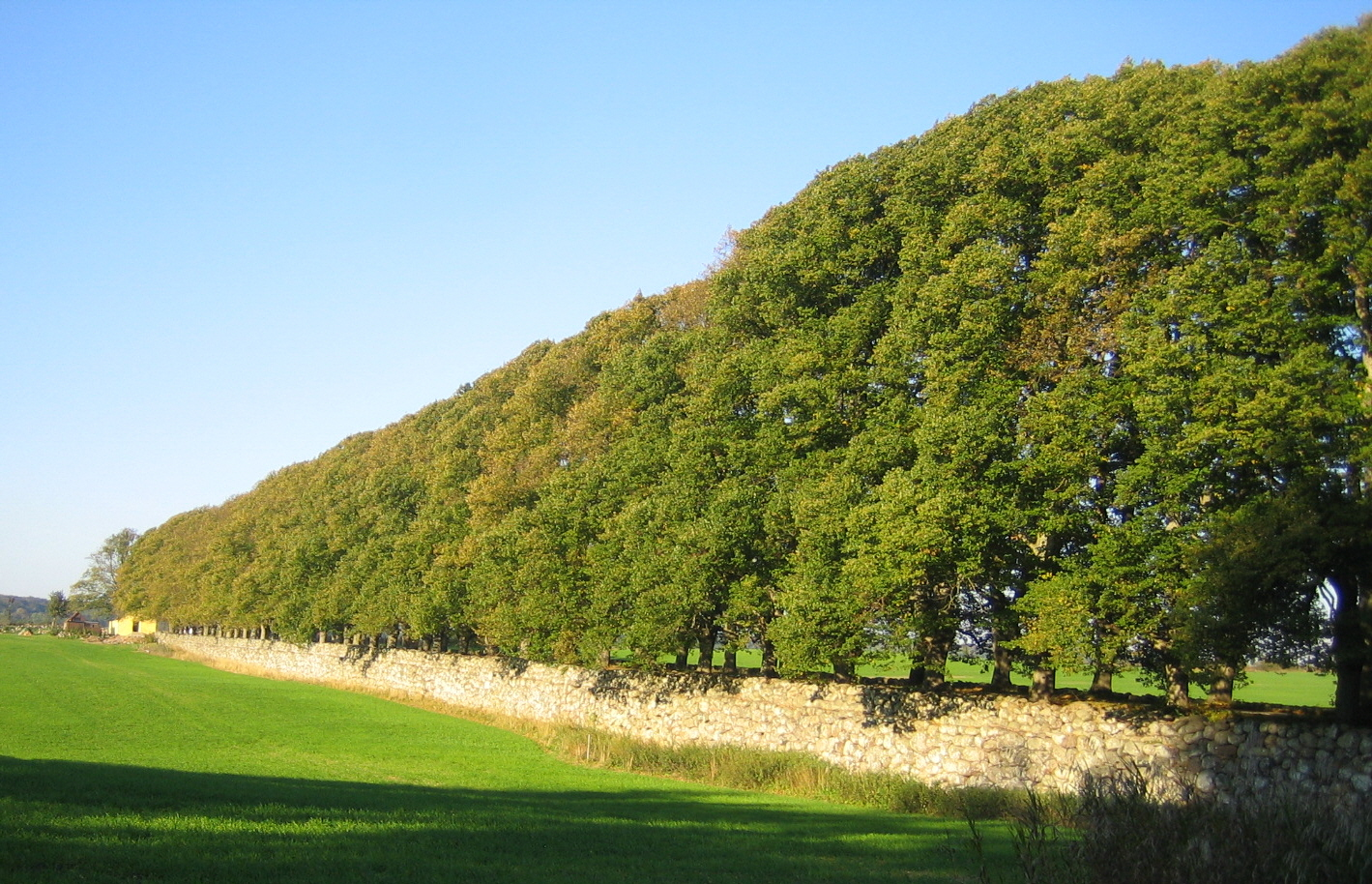
One of the causeways leading up to the manor

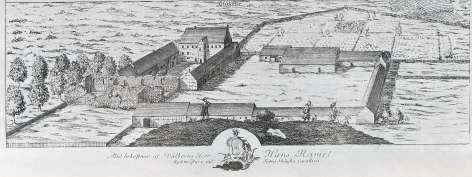
View of the estate ca. 1680
