= Harald Stake =

Swedish military commander

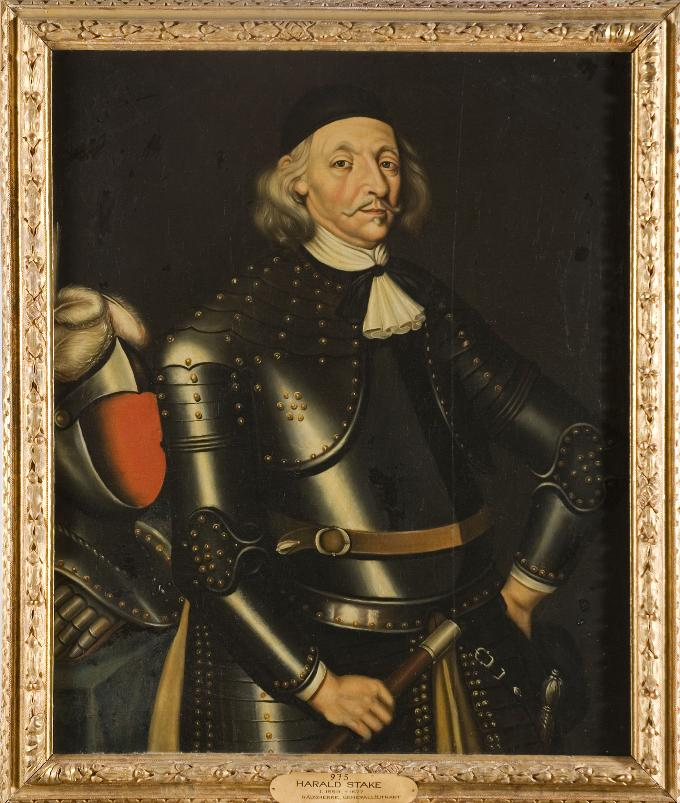
Harald Stake

Harald Stake (1598-1677) was a Swedish military commander.

In his early life, he was in military service in the Low Countries. After returning to Sweden, he served with distinction during the Swedish wars 1630-1648 as an officer in the cavalry. On 27 May 1645, he defeated a Danish force led by Iver Krabbe at Landvetter. In the following years he served as military commander and governor in Bohuslän. As governor, he defended Bohus fortress against a Dano–Norwegian army in 1676.

== Works cited ==
- Essen, Michael Fredholm von (2019). Charles XI’s War: The Scanian War Between Sweden and Denmark, 1675-1679. Century of the Soldier. Helion & Company. ISBN 9781911628002.
- Munthe, Carl Oscar (1901). Hannibalsfejden 1644–1645: Den norske hærs bloddåb [Hannibal's feud 1644–1645: The Norwegian army's blood baptism] (in Danish). Oslo: Grøndahl & Søns bogtrykkeri.
