= Smiles of a Summer Night =

1955 film by Ingmar Bergman

- Theatrical release poster
- Directed by: Ingmar Bergman
- Written by: Ingmar Bergman
- Produced by: Allan Ekelund
- Starring: Ulla Jacobsson; Eva Dahlbeck; Harriet Andersson; Margit Carlqvist; Gunnar Björnstrand; Jarl Kulle
- Cinematography: Gunnar Fischer
- Edited by: Oscar Rosander
- Music by: Erik Nordgren
- Distributed by: Svensk Filmindustri
- Release date: 26 December 1955
- Running time: 108 minutes
- Country: Sweden
- Language: Swedish

Smiles of a Summer Night (Swedish: Sommarnattens leende) is a 1955 Swedish period comedy film written and directed by Ingmar Bergman. It was shown at the 1956 Cannes Film Festival and received positive reviews from critics. In 2005, Time magazine ranked it as one of the 100 greatest films since 1923.

The film's plot—which involves some couples who switch partners on a summer night—has been adapted many times, particularly as the theatrical musical A Little Night Music by Stephen Sondheim, Hugh Wheeler and Harold Prince, which opened on Broadway in 1973, and as Woody Allen's film A Midsummer Night's Sex Comedy (1982).

== Plot ==
The film takes place in Sweden around the turn of the twentieth century. Fredrik Egerman is a middle-aged lawyer married to a 19-year-old beauty, Anne. Their two-year marriage is still unconsummated, due to Anne's reluctance. Egerman has a son, Henrik, from his marriage to his late first wife. Henrik is in his early twenties and is studying to be a minister but is currently tormented by his love for his step-mother, who secretly loves him in return. Henrik is distracting himself from his urges by attempting an inconclusive affair with Egerman's lusty young servant, Petra.

Between his two marriages, Fredrik had an affair with a prominent stage actress, the beautiful Desiree Armfeldt, but she broke off the relationship. Desiree now has a young son named Fredrik Armfeldt, born shortly after her affair with Fredrik Egerman. (It is implied, but never directly stated, that little Fredrik Armfeldt is the son of Egerman.) Desiree is now having an affair with an army officer, Count Carl-Magnus Malcolm. The Count's wife, Charlotte, is an old friend of Egerman's second wife Anne.

Egerman goes to see Desiree one night to pour out his marital troubles to her and ask for her help. He falls into a puddle outside Desiree's house, and Desiree dresses him in the Count's nightshirt. The violently jealous Count shows up and orders Egerman to leave. After Egerman goes, the Count and Desiree argue and subsequently decide to part amicably. When the Count returns home, he tells Charlotte about the encounter and orders her to tell Anne about Egerman's supposed infidelity (though no infidelity actually occurred). When Charlotte visits Anne, she confesses that she loves the Count despite everything, and would do anything to be loved in return.

To solve these woes, Desiree has her mother invite all the characters to her country house for Midsummer Night, the shortest night of the year, a traditional observance in Sweden, when many party-goers stay awake all night until dawn. Desiree and Charlotte become temporary allies. Henrik and Anne, unexpectedly finding themselves alone together in a bedroom, consummate their relationship and elope with the assistance of Petra and her new lover Frid, another servant. Charlotte then joins Egerman in the garden pavilion. Learning his wife is with Egerman, the Count bursts in and challenges Fredrik to a game of Russian roulette. Egerman loses, but the Count had loaded the revolver with soot so neither party was ever in danger. The Count reunites with his wife, his feelings for her renewed by his jealousy. Desiree comforts Egerman, and he asks her not to leave him. The dilemmas of the four pairs of lovers appear to be happily resolved in the course of a night, said by Frid to have smiled three smiles upon them all.

== Cast ==
- Ulla Jacobsson – Anne Egerman
- Eva Dahlbeck – Desiree Armfeldt
- Harriet Andersson – Petra
- Margit Carlqvist – Countess Charlotte Malcolm
- Gunnar Björnstrand – Fredrik Egerman
- Jarl Kulle – Count Carl-Magnus Malcolm
- Åke Fridell – Frid
- Björn Bjelfvenstam – Henrik Egerman
- Naima Wifstrand – Mrs. Armfeldt
- Jullan Kindahl – Beata
- Gull Natorp – Malla
- Birgitta Valberg – Actress
- Bibi Andersson – Actress

== Production ==
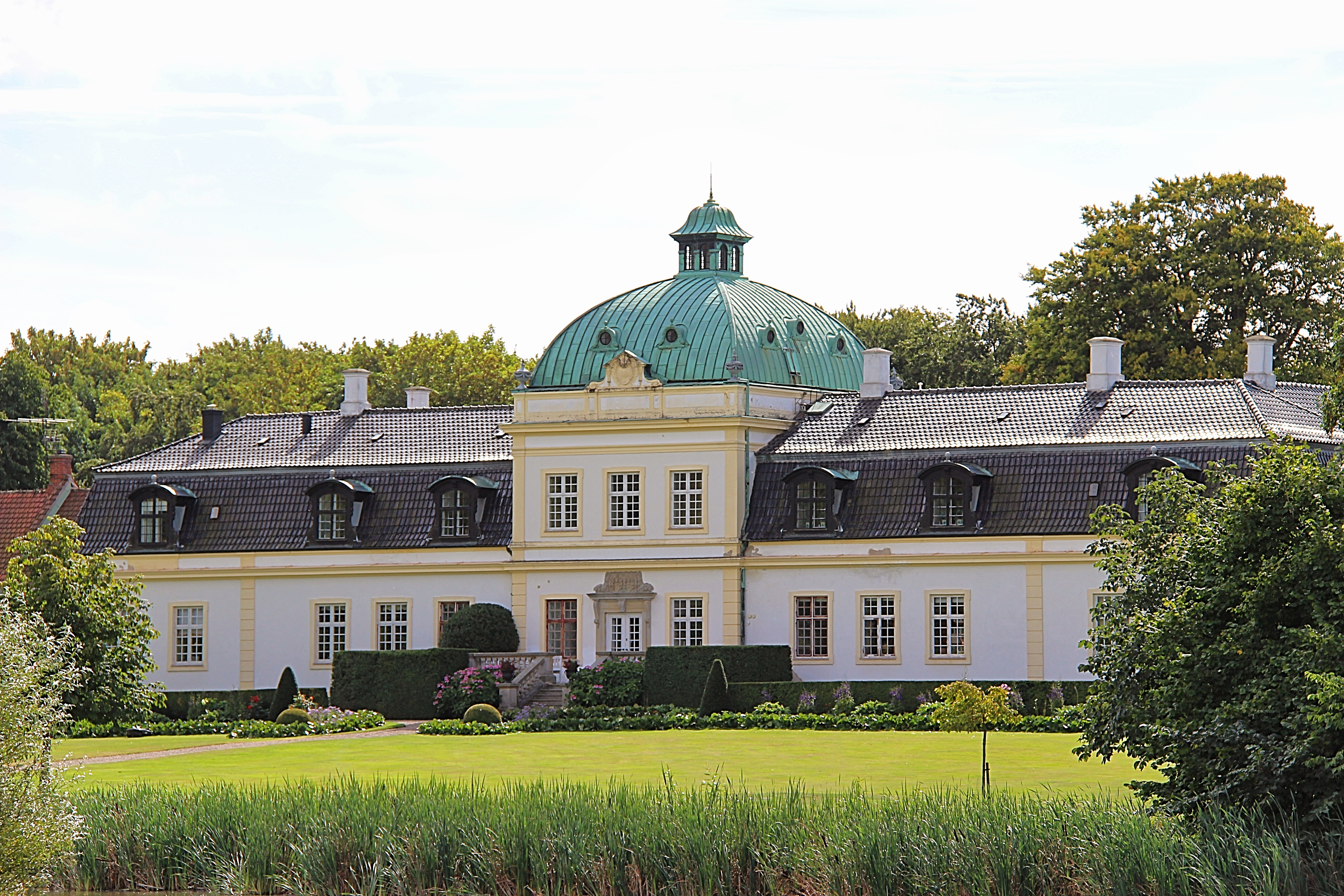
Jordberga Castle

Smiles of a Summer Night was filmed on location at Jordberga Castle in Scania and at Svensk Filmindustri's Filmstaden in Råsunda, Stockholm, beginning on 28 June 1955 and completing on 29 August, except for two additional days in November 1955.

== Release ==
The film premiered at the Red Mill (Swedish: Röda Kvarn) cinema in Stockholm on 26 December 1955.

== Reception ==
Smiles of a Summer Night opened to highly positive reviews and is viewed favorably today. The film ranked sixth on Cahiers du Cinéma's Top 10 Films of the Year List in 1956, and won the Bodil Award for Best European Film in 1957. It was nominated for a BAFTA Award in Best Film From Any Source category in 1957.

On the review aggregator website Rotten Tomatoes, 100% of 16 critics' reviews are positive. In 2012, Roger Ebert added the film to his Great Movies list, writing, "having not seen it for most of a lifetime, I was startled by how quickly in beguiled me. There is an abundance of passion here, but none of it feels reckless." Film critic Pauline Kael called the film "a nearly perfect work", writing "The film is bathed in beauty, removed from the banalities of short skirts and modern-day streets and shops, and removed in time, it draws us closer."

In 1996, Smiles of a Summer Night was included in Movieline Magazine's "100 Greatest Foreign Films". In 2012, the film was voted at number twenty in the 25 best Swedish films of all time by a poll of 50 film critics and academics conducted by film magazine FLM.

When Stanley Cavell saw Smiles of a Summer Night, he was so affected that he returned home and wrote about it the rest of that night. The experience led him to explore the intersection between his field, philosophy, and film.
