= Sundholmen Castle =

Medieval ruined castle in Västra Götaland County, Sweden

- Sundholmens slott
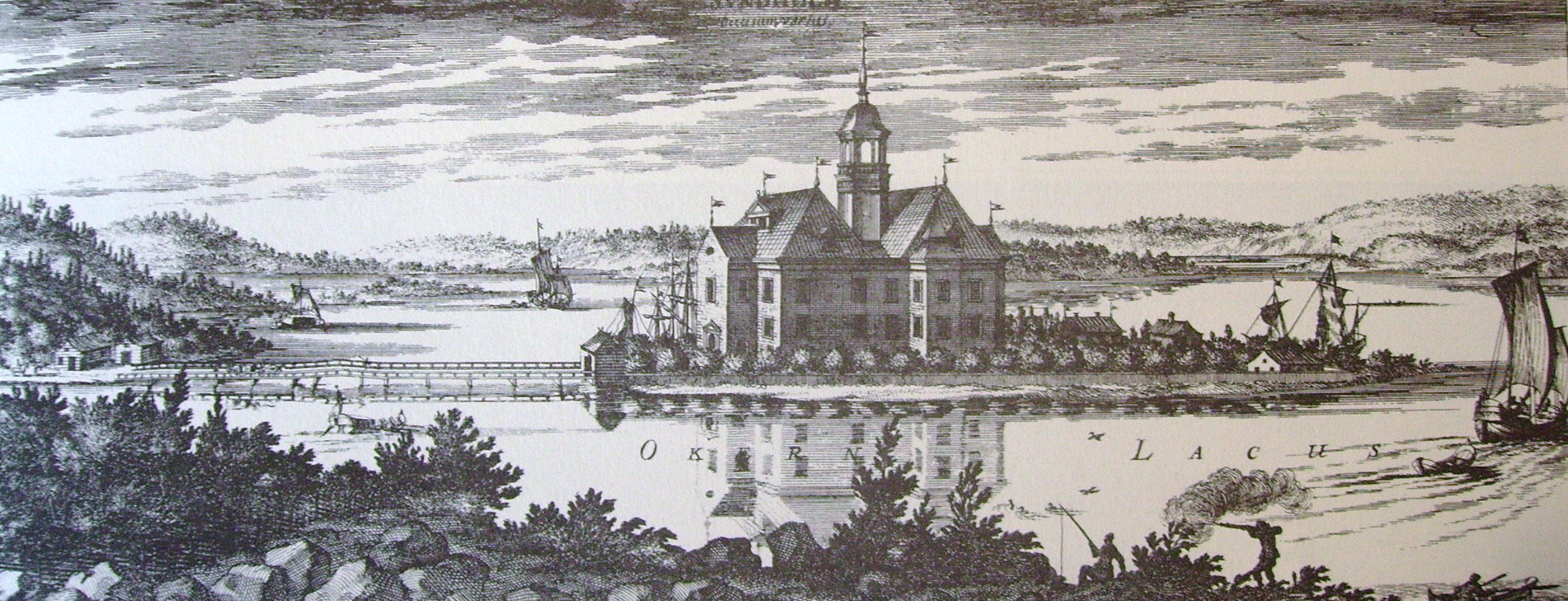
- Sundholmen Castle depicted by Erik Dahlbergh in Suecia antiqua et hodierna
- Interactive map of the Sundholmen Castle area

General information
- Architectural style: Medieval castle
- Location: Lake Tolken, Västra Götaland County, Sweden
- Coordinates: 57°45′18″N 13°13′25″E
- Construction started: Middle Ages
- Completed: c. 1540s (rebuilt as fortified stone house)

Design and construction
- Architect: Unknown
- Other designers: Per Brahe the Elder (1540s expansion)

Sundholmen Castle (Swedish: Sundholmens slott) is a medieval ruined castle located on an island in lake Tolken, in Västra Götaland County. It has been abandoned for centuries and has become a bat sanctuary.

== History ==
The oldest construction on the small island in lake Tolken dates back to the Middle Ages. It may possibly have been a monastery. During the 15th century, the estate eventually came into the possession of the Snakenborg family. In the 1540s, Per Brahe the Elder transformed Sundholmen into a fortified stone house. Further additions were carried out by Gustaf and Magnus Brahe. The estate was confiscated by the crown during Charles XI’s Reduction. The castle subsequently fell into decay and burned in 1706 after being struck by lightning. Since then, it has remained in ruins. The ruins were partially restored in the early 1990s and were made accessible by boat.
