= Niels Trolle =

Danish nobleman (1599–1667)

Niels Trolle R.E.
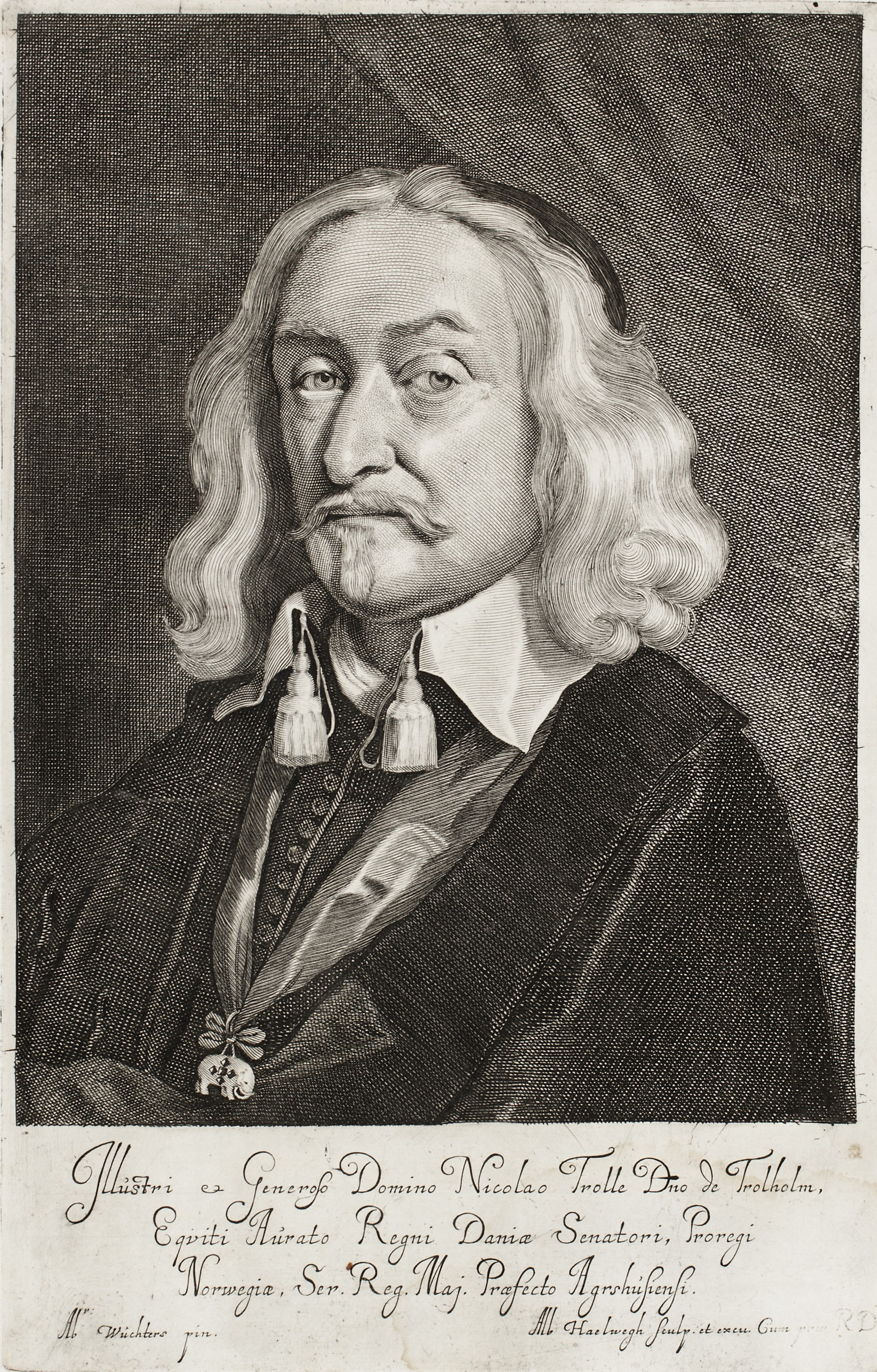
- Portrait of Niels Trolle
- Born: 20 December 1599; Ringkøbing, Denmark
- Died: 20 September 1667 (aged 67)
- Occupations: landowner, naval officer, Governor-General of Norway (1656–1661)
- Spouse(s): Mette Corfitzdatter Rud (d. 25 Feb 1632); Helle Rosenkrantz (d. 22 Nov 1685)
- Awards: Knight of the Elephant (1648)

Niels Trolle til Trollesholm og Gavnø (20 December 1599 – 20 September 1667) was a Danish nobleman who served as vice admiral under Christian IV and later as Steward of Norway from 1656 to 1661. He played a central administrative role during the Nordic War.

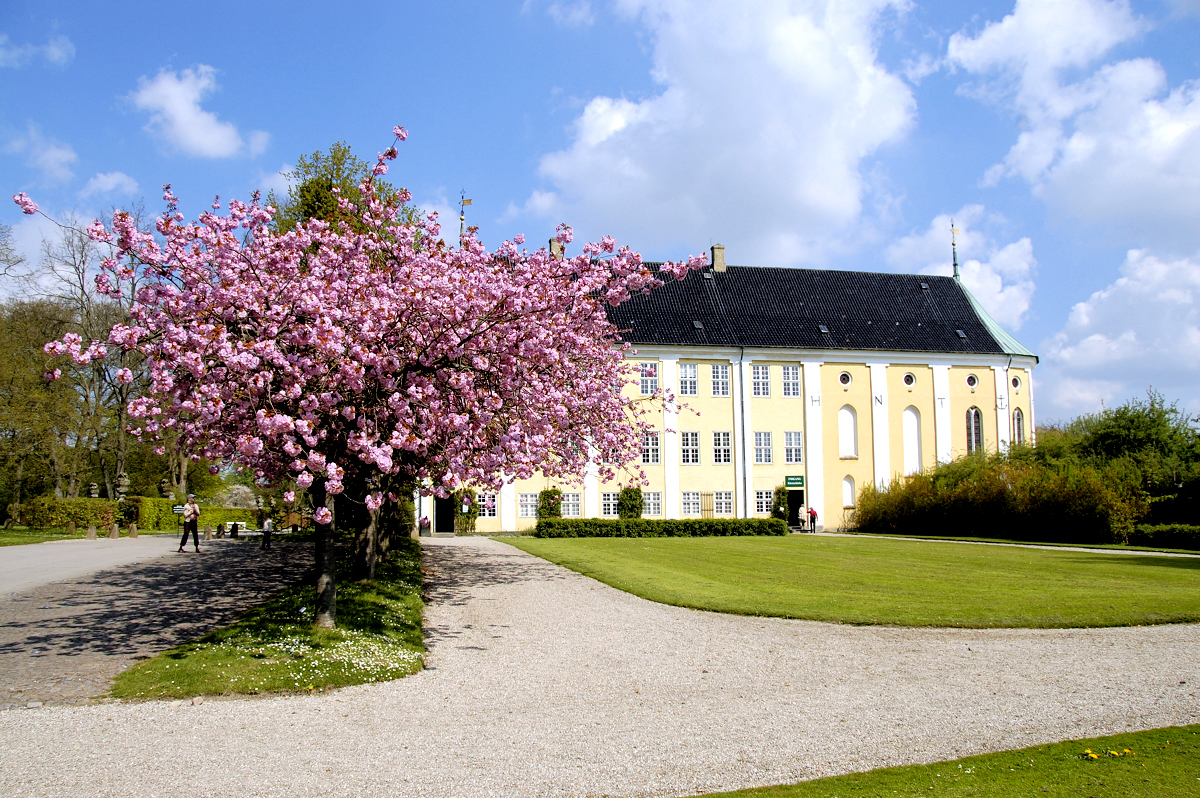
Gavnø Gods

== Personal life ==
Trolle was born in Ringkøbing and was a brother-in-law of Gregers Krabbe and Niels Krabbe. He was the son of vassal Børge Trolle (d. 1610). He studied at Herlufsholm School for 2 years, and later went on a field trip to Leipzig. Trolle returned home in 1615 only to leave again to study abroad in Giessen. After a brief visit to his home in Denmark, he studied at the University of Padua, and also in France and England.

On 23 July 1626, he married Mette Corfitzdatter Rud, who died on 25 February 1632. In 1634, Trolle was appointed Lord Lieutenant of Copenhagen Castle, and on 16 October 1636, he married Helle Rosenkrantz (1618-1685), daughter of Holger Rosenkrantz, at Glimminge.

The estate at Gavnø (Gavnø Gods) in Næstved was acquired by Niels Trolle in 1663. In the late 1660s, the church became a private chapel. It was embellished by his wife Lady Helle Rosenkrantz into one of Denmark's most colorful churches and is the only visible remnant of the priory.

== Career ==
After serving in several positions as an agent of the nobility, Trolle was elected as a land commissioner in Zealand in 1638. He became a member of the Admiralty Court in Bremerholm in 1639. In 1643, when the Torstensson War started, he served as a general provisioning commissioner until the spring of 1645, when Christian IV offered him the position of vice admiral.

Trolle did not play a major role in the war as a naval officer. Although he was ordered to aid in the defense of the island of Bornholm in June 1645, the island fell before his forces could participate, and his fleet and company were confined in the Copenhagen harbor.

In August, the Second Treaty of Bromsebro (Brømsebrofreden) was signed and in September he participated in the exchange of ratifications in Markaryd for which the fleet was unprepared. Christian IV was very angry at him for his attitude against his father-in-law, Holger Rosenkrantz, during the procession of nobles in 1646.

In 1647, he was a member of a commission to investigate the financial condition. Then in August 1648, he followed Frederick III to Akershus Fortress and received the Order of the Elephant (Ridder af Elefantordenen, R.E.), the highest order of Denmark-Norway. In February 1650, he joined the commission to report on the navy but resigned as vice-admiral due to infirmity in January 1651. He heard cases for Hannibal Sehested and Corfitz Ulfeldt, and in July was given a seat on the review commission to examine deliveries to Holmen. In 1655, he became a member of the newly established Admiralty.

Trolle had been strongly considered for Statholder of Norway in 1651 after Hannibal Sehested, and in 1656 he succeeded his brother-in-law Gregers Krabbe to the position. He was appointed to Akershus len (county) instead of Roskilde. Lieutenant General Jørgen Bjelke, commander-in-chief of the Norwegian army, was highly critical of Trolle's governorship due to his lack of support and inactivity during the second war with Sweden (1658–1660).

In 1660, Trolle was among those who was the most critical over Frederick III's revolution to install himself as an absolute monarch. Rumors spread among the opposition that he had been beaten by a citizen of Copenhagen, because of his views. Later Trolle accepted absolute monarch, and became a member of the privy council, 13 October 1660. At the same time, he endured personal difficulties caused by Colonel Jørgen Løvenklaus. They had a violent disagreements in October, which led to interrogations by the Royal Commission. In March 1661, the Supreme Court acquitted Trolle of all Løvenklau's accusations and condemned his opponent to suffer as a liar. However, he complained that he was tried by a court, because of his nobel background.

== Decline and death ==
Trolle was succeeded as Governor of Norway by Iver Krabbe (1602–1666) in September 1661. He settled in Copenhagen, but was not taken in any of the new management colleges, felt strongly infringed by the new ranking rules of 1662, and was regarded for several years as an opponent of the government. He died on 20 September 1667, and was buried in the chapel of Roskilde Cathedral.
