= Siege of Bohus Fortress (1676) =

Failed siege of Bohus

Siege of Bohus fortress
- Part of the Scanian War
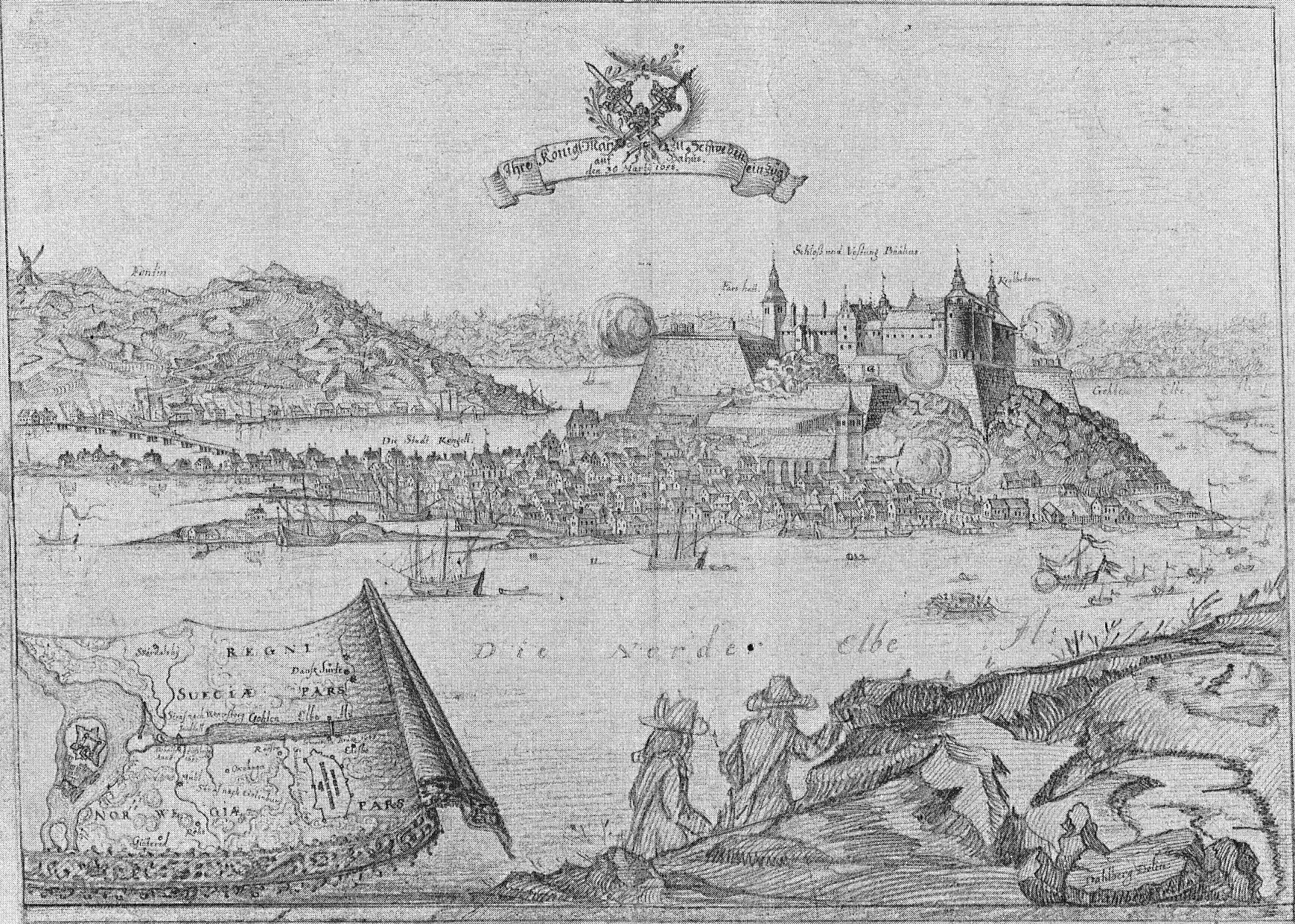
- Depiction of Bohus fortress during a visit by Charles X Gustav in 1658
Date	12 August – 16 September 1676
Location	Bohus Fortress, Sweden 57°51′42″N 11°59′58″E
Result	Swedish victory
Territorial changes	Dano-Norwegian withdrawal from Bohus

Belligerents
(yes) Swedish Empire	Denmark–Norway

Commanders and leaders
(yes) Harald Stake (yes) Børge Drackenberg	Ulrik Frederik Gyldenløve; Jens Juel; Henrik Rysensteen; Hans Løwenhielm

Units involved
(yes) Bohus garrison	Unknown

Strength
1,400 men	3,800 men 12 guns

Casualties and losses
Unknown	Unknown

The siege of Bohus fortress (Swedish: Belägringen av Bohus fästning) occurred in 1676 during the early stages of the Scanian War when Norwegian general Ulrik Frederik Gyldenløve invaded Bohuslän and besieged Bohus fortress, retreating on 16 September after supplies dwindled and the Swedish commander in the fortress refused to surrender.

== Background ==
On 8 June 1676, Ulrik Frederik Gyldenløve along with Jens Juel and the general's Henrik Rysensteen and Hans Løwenhielm invaded Western Sweden with an army of 4,000 men and 12 cannons. After crossing the border, he defeated a Swedish force of 1,600 men at Kvistrum bridge under the command of Hans Georg Mörner. He would then go to Uddevalla, capturing it on 17 June with only 14 losses and later captured Vänersborg on 26 June. In July, he led his remaining 3,800 men towards Gothenburg to blockade it from land and sea, but this was blocked by a Swedish squadron under Admiral-Lieutenant Siöblad, and without the ability to move artillery by sea, Gyldenløve concluded that he could not capture Gothenburg.

In mid-August, Gyldenløve decided to besiege Bohus which had a garrison of 1,400 men. He had brought a number of siege artillery overland. Bohus was commanded by Colonel Børge Drackenberg and Harald Stake, who was also the governor of Bohuslän.

=== Prelude ===
Initially, Stake tried preventing the Norwegian advance at Angegårde, and despite being successful at first, he retreated as the Norwegian force threatened his flank, burning bridges and destroying the road during his retreat. On 12 August, he burned Kungälv, which was situated below Bohus fortress.

== Siege ==
Soon, Gyldenløve besieged the fortress, and after capturing a bastion he established an artillery battery in it on 24 August. He then sent a letter to Stake requesting his capitulation, with the response being filled with a graphic description how Stake had used Gyldenløve's letter to wipe his behind. Additionally, he received a report that a Swedish relief force of 20,000 men was approaching under the command of Magnus De la Gardie. He was also informed that Jacob Duncan had been defeated at Halmstad and that Charles XI was advancing from there. Gyldenløve also lacked supplies, especially since Stake had razed what was locally available before withdrawing into Bohus. On 16 September, Gyldenløve abandoned the siege after being informed that the Danish council would not be able to send him help for the winter.

== Aftermath ==
After retreating, Gyldenløve went to Uddevalla, and then to Vetterlandsbro and later crossed the Svinesund into Norway. He ordered Rysensteen to abandon Vänersborg and the fortifications there were destroyed. Nearby Swedish troops attempted in vain to stop the destruction of these.

== Works cited ==
- Essen, Michael Fredholm von (2019). Charles XI’s War: The Scanian War Between Sweden and Denmark, 1675-1679. Century of the Soldier. Helion & Company. ISBN 9781911628002.
- Vaupell, Otto Frederik (1872). Den danske hærs historie til nutiden og den norske hærs historie, indtil 1814 [The history of the Danish army to the present day and the history of the Norwegian army until 1814] (in Danish). Copenhagen: Gyldendal.
- Jensen, N.P. (1900). Den Skaanske Krig [The Scanian War] (PDF) (in Danish). Copenhagen: Ernst Bojesen.
