= Krabbé =

Krabbé is a surname, and may refer to:

- Hendrik Maarten Krabbé, or Heinrich Martin Krabbé (1868–1931), Dutch artist
- Jeroen Krabbé (born 1944), Dutch actor
- Maarten Krabbé (1908–2005), Dutch painter
- Martijn Krabbé (born 1968), Dutch TV presenter
- Tim Krabbé (born 1943), Dutch journalist

== See also ==
- Krabbe

.
