= Björn Bjelfvenstam =

Swedish actor (born 1929)

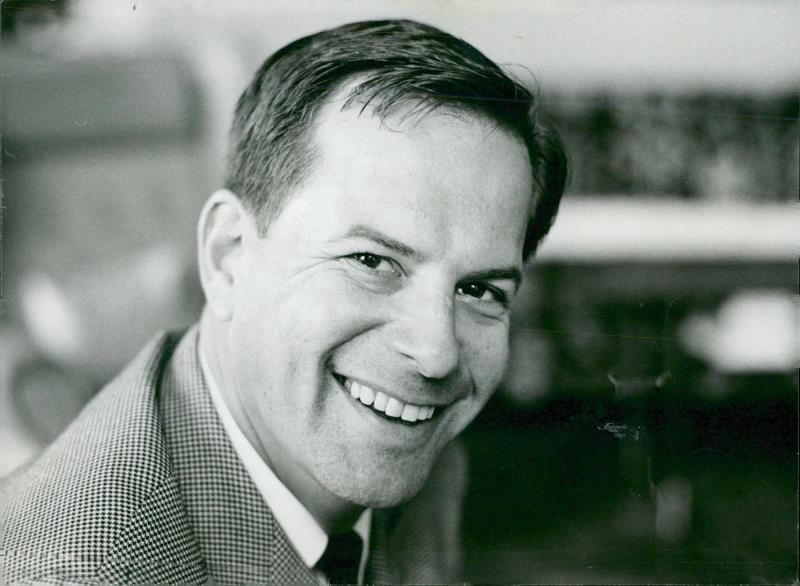
- Born: 19 February 1929 (age 97); Uppsala, Sweden
- Years active: 1952-1998

Björn Bjelfvenstam (born 19 February 1929) is a Swedish film actor. He was born in Uppsala, Sweden.

== Career ==
Bjelfvenstam began his acting career in the theater in Uppsala. He studied first with the Axel Witzanskys theater school from 1949-1950. Later, we worked at Malmö City Theater between 1953 and 1957 under Ingmar Bergman's leadership. In the 1950s, he appeared in our films directed by Bergman. He is probably best-known for his large supporting roles in the Bergman film classics Smiles of a Summer Night (1955) and Wild Strawberries (1957).

His older brother was the director, writer and author Bo Bjelfvenstam.

== Filmography ==
- Trots (1952)
- Secrets of Women (1952)
- The Shadow (1953)
- Dreams (1955)
- Smiles of a Summer Night (1955)
- Last Pair Out (1956)
- Wild Strawberries (1957)
- Rider in Blue (1959)
- Av hjärtans lust (1960)
- En historia till fredag (TV mini-series, 1965)
- Kvällspressen (TV series, one episode, 1992)
- Den vite riddaren (TV mini-series, 1994)
- Tre kronor (TV series, 1994-1998, 91 episodes)
