= Anne Krabbe =

Danish writer (1552–1618)

Anne Krabbe (1552-1618) was a Danish writer. She was the daughter of Erik Krabbe til Bustrup (1510–1564) and Margrethe Reventlow (1525–1606), and married Jacob Bjørn (1561–1596) in 1588.

As a widow later on, she was given responsibility for the marital estate "Stenalt" in 1596. She has been described as one of the most learned noblewomen in Denmark during her time. Copies of her work are kept in the Danish National Archives. Some of her works include: "A Little Useful Prayer Book" (1612) and "Haand Postilla" (1616).
