= Bo Bjelfvenstam =

Swedish actor and film director (1924–2025)

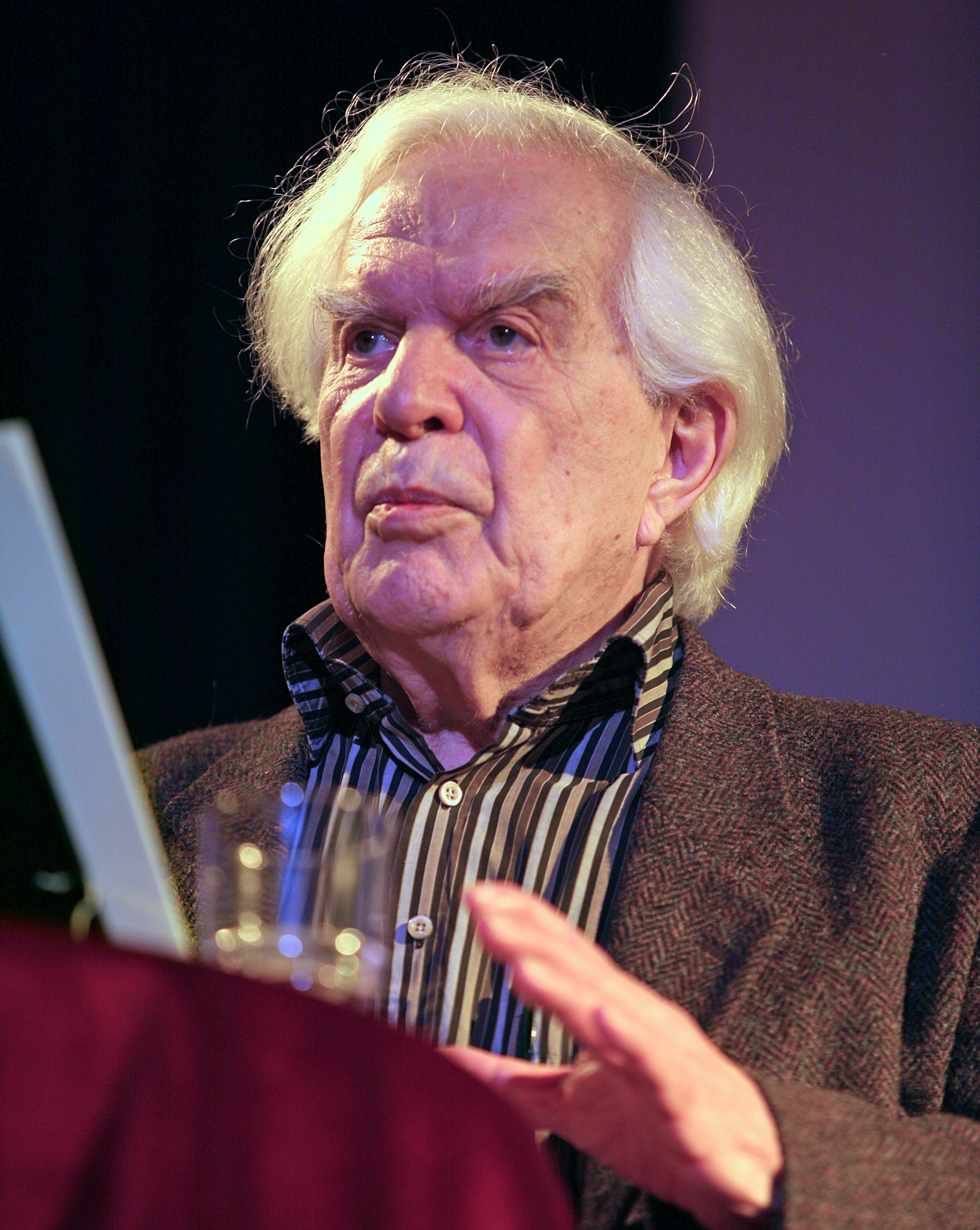
- Bjelfvenstam in 2009
- Born: Bo Gunnar Bjelfvenstam; 24 April 1924; Stockholm, Sweden
- Died: 9 May 2025 (aged 101)
- Education: Uppsala University
- Occupations: Actor; director; author
- Years active: 1947–present
- Spouse: Dorothea Richard (m. 1960)
- Children: 1

Bo Gunnar Bjelfvenstam (24 April 1924 – 9 May 2025) was a Swedish actor, film director and author.

== Life and career ==
Bjelfvenstam was born in Stockholm on 24 April 1924. He was the son of the director of studies Erik Bjelfvenstam and Karin Jacobsson and the brother of Björn Bjelfvenstam. Bjelfvenstam was educated at Uppsala University, receiving a Bachelor of Arts in 1944 and after military service began working with students theater and film in Stockholm. He made several documentaries, not least about Africa. He also wrote books with a historical theme, including De ville so much, which deals with Swedish politicians from Karl XIV Johan to Olof Palme.

He married Dorothea Richard in 1960 and they had a son. Bjelfvenstam died on 9 May 2025, at the age of 101.

== Filmography ==
- Från Fjärdingen och Svartbäcken (1947)
- Landet vi glömmer (1949)
- Där vägarna sluta (1949)
- Post på hjul (1949)
- Dans i Dalom (1950)
- Gasmask typ A (1951)
- Folkgasmasken (1951)
- Vi klär oss för fjällen (1952)
- Rallare hos Tito (1952)
- En film om Gåsinge-Dillnäs (1952)
- Blekingefiskare (1952)
- Vår socken: en film om Gryt 1951–52 (1952)
- Paket på Posten (1953)
- Indianvägar (1953)
- Mayaland (1954)
- Bananfart (1954)
- Märkliga märken (1955)
- Att köra rätt och riktigt (1955)
- I samma verk (1956)
- Det gäller ditt liv (1957)
- Uppåt (1960)
- Arlanda. Huvudbanan (1961)
- The Face of Sweden 1–8 (1961–62)
- Lindökanalen (1962)
- Sveriges ansikte (1963)

== Bibliography ==
- I Somalia, 1982
- Marita, 1987
- Leva i Afrika, 1989
- Svenska resenärer och äventyrare, 1997
- De ville så mycket : svenska politiker från Karl XIV Johan till Olof Palme, 1999
- Aldrig ett scoop : bildningsresa genom ett halvt sekel, 2007
