= Viskan =

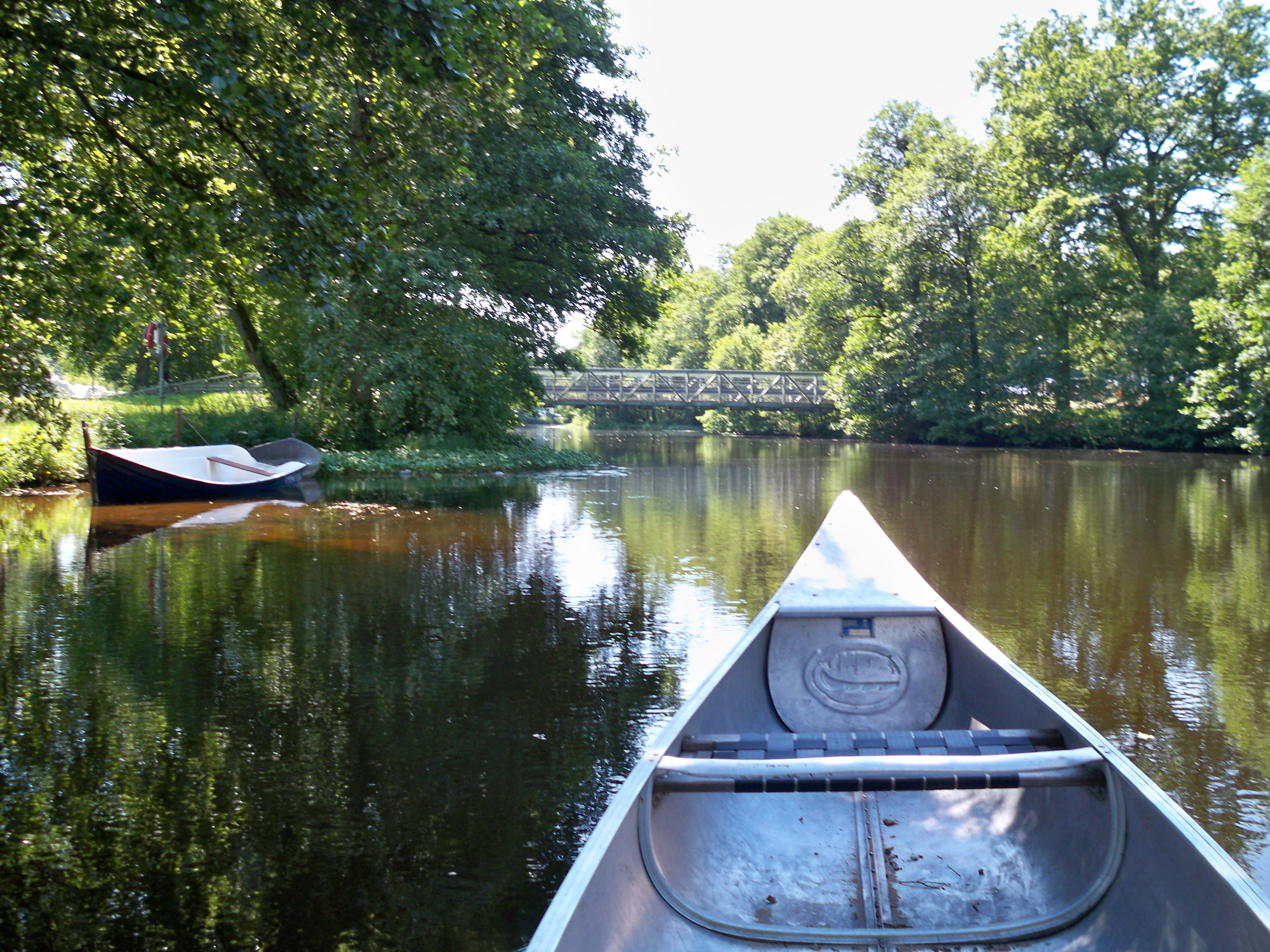
- Viskan where it runs through Borås

Location
- Country: Sweden
- Counties: Västra Götaland County, Halland County
- City: Borås

Physical characteristics
- Source: Tolken
  - location: Ulricehamn Municipality, Västra Götaland County, Sweden
  - coordinates: 57°47′30″N 13°15′00″E
  - elevation: 226 m (741 ft)
- Mouth: Klosterfjorden, Kattegatt
  - location: Varberg Municipality, Halland County, Sweden
  - coordinates: 57°13′30″N 12°12′20″E
  - elevation: 0 m (0 ft)
- Length: 140 km (87 mi)
- Basin size: 2,202.1 km^{2} (850.2 sq mi)
- Discharge
  - average: 34 m^{3}/s (1,200 cu ft/s)

Basin features
- Tributaries
  - left: Häggån, Slottsån
  - right: Munkån, Surteån

Viskan is a river in the south west of Sweden. It is about 140 kilometers long. It starts in the lake Tolken outside Ulricehamn and has its outlet in the Kattegatt. It runs through Borås.
