= Niclas Lafrensen =

Swedish genre and miniature painter (1737–1807)

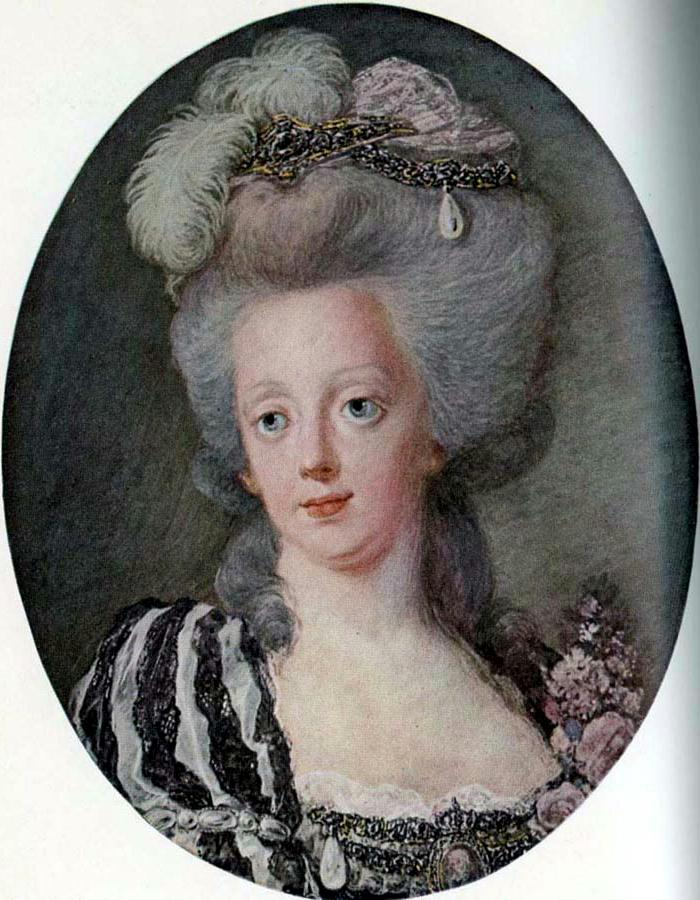
Portrait of Queen Sophia Magdalene of Sweden, circa 1792

Niklas Lafrensen (30 October 1737 – 6 December 1807) was a Swedish genre and miniature painter. Active in Paris and Stockholm, Lafrensen is considered one of the chief European miniaturist of the second half of the 18th century.

Niklas Lafrensen (known in French as Nicolas Lavreince) was the son of painter Niklas Lafrensen the Elder and Magdalena Stuur. His father was a skilled miniature portrait painter, popular at the Swedish court. Lafrensen received his earliest training from him. His father thought him miniature painting as well as the gouache technique. Lafrensen the younger was in Paris from 1762 to 1769. In 1773 he became a member of the Painter and Sculptor Academy. In Paris, he came under the influence of the French Rococo, which suited his temperament. He chose to represent realistic topics in painting, as opposed to subjects relating to the antique world. This granted him popularity among the public. By contrast, he wasn't a favorite of the intellectuals and pedagogues. Upon his return to Stockholm, he was appointed Royal Court Miniature Painter, and was commissioned a dozen miniature portraits by Prince Gustav. Lafrensen was accepted in the Royal Swedish Academy of Fine Arts, but later passed over.

He is said to have become exasperated that he had been passed over by his professors, and that was the reason he left Sweden in 1774 and re-settled in Paris, where for 17 years worked as an artist under the name Lavreince. In 1791 Lafrensen was forced to leave France during the French Revolution, and came home to Sweden and painted a portrait of (now) King Gustav III shortly before his death. In the latter part of his life his artistic output was scarce.

Besides miniatures, Lafrensen painted mostly gouache. Lafrensen is represented in a number of Swedish and foreign museums, including a dozen of his works at The Louvre. The Nationalmuseum owns about 50 of his miniatures and 13 gouaches, including Three Ladies Who Make Music, Music Making Men and Women in Landscape and Card Gaming Ladies.
