= Gregers Krabbe =

Danish nobleman (1594–1655)

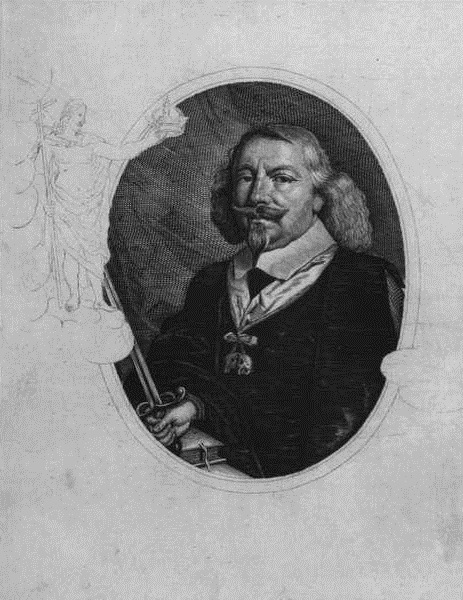
- Gregers Krabbe, engraving by H.A. Greys
- In office 1651–1655
- Monarch: Frederick III

Governor-general of Norway
- Preceded by: Hannibal Sehested
- Succeeded by: Niels Trolle

Personal details
- Born: 12 January 1594 Jutland, Denmark
- Died: 20 December 1655 (aged 61) Akershus Fortress
- Relatives: Niels Trolle (brother-in-law); Niels Krabbe (brother-in-law)
- Occupation: Nobleman; Landowner
- Awards: Knight of the Elephant

Gregers Krabbe (12 January 1594 – 20 December 1655) was a Danish nobleman who served as Governor-general of Norway.

== Biography ==
He was born in on the Vesløsgård estate at Hannæs in northwestern Jutland, Denmark. He was a son of Niels Krabbe til Vesløsgård (d. 1626) and Vibeke Ulfstand (1559–1611). He was a brother-in-law of Niels Trolle and Niels Krabbe. From the age of 14 to the age of 23, he stayed abroad, partly as an educational trip with studies in Germany, France and Italy.

From 1617 to 1625 he was secretary in the Danish Chancellery. From 1627 he was lord over the Danish county of Hindsgavl in Odense and from 1639 to 1651 at Riberhus. He was a member of the national council from 1640, and held several diplomatic missions from 1640-1643. He served as Governor-general of Norway from 1651, and died at the Akershus Castle in Christiania (now Oslo) in 1655. He was succeeded as governor by his brother-in-law Niels Trolle.
