= Jörgen Krabbe =

Danish–Swedish lawyer and nobleman (1633–1678)

Baron Jörgen Iversen Krabbe of Krogholm Castle (now Krageholm) (1633–1678) was a Danish jurist and later a Swedish nobleman, who was one of the most influential men in the province of Scania and played an important role during the Scanian War of 1676–1679. He was executed by the Swedes for high treason.

== Early life and education ==
Krabbe was born at Laholm Castle in Halland in eastern Denmark in 1633, the son of the later Governor-General of Norway, Iver Krabbe and the Scanian noble lady Karen Marsvin of Dybäck. The family's ancestral home was Jordberga in Scania, which at the time was part of Denmark. Jörgen had an older brother, Tage, and seven sisters. He was particularly good friends with his sister Karen. Jörgen was sent to boarding school at Sorö where he learnt Latin, geometry, fencing, horse-riding and dancing, the way young men of good families were supposed to back then. He was very studious and fond of Latin and French.

Jörgen Krabbe then studied law at the universities of Bologna, Orléans and Copenhagen.He travelled around Europe with his brother Tage and they also studied together in France and Italy. In 1657, Denmark-Norway was invaded by the Swedes and they had to return home. Tage enlisted with the army but Jörgen continued to study at first but then he was in Copenhagen when it was besieged by the Swedes (siege of Copenhagen) and he probably had to participate in the defence with the student troops.

== Becoming Swedish ==
In 1658, Scania was ceded to Sweden. People in Denmark were desperate but they couldn't do anything. Jörgen chose to stay in Scania. He gave up his prestigious position at the Danish Chancellery and pledged loyalty to the King of Sweden, since it was against the law for Scanian residents to work for the Danish state and own property in Denmark. King Christian V of Denmark-Norway had offered him a position as county judge but Krabbe chose to renounce his career and return to Scania where he had his fiancée Jytte Tagesen Thott.

The Krabbe family split their property between their two sons: Jörgen took over the Scanian lands and became Swedish, Tage remained Danish and took over their Danish lands. The girls all got a castle each, too. Jörgen Krabbe and Jytte Thott got married in Malmö in 1664 and had a lavish wedding feast with guests from both Denmark and Sweden, though the celebrations were exclusively in Danish. There were three toasts to Denmark and two to Sweden.

Jörgen Krabbe had high hopes of a career at the bar in Sweden but he found himself having to turn to large-scale farming as his main employment, and in his letters, he complained bitterly of this although he was very fond of Krogholm Castle where he lived with his wife. The couple also ran Högestad Castle, Baldringe Farm, Tosterup Castle and Ingelstorp Manor. The same year as his wedding, Krabbe gained recognition as a Swedish nobleman, and was also a representative in the Swedish Diet in Stockholm. In 1676 he became a Swedish Baron, which he found to be an empty title compared to the career he had wished for. He wrote to his old friend and former estate manager, Hack Sörensen, and complained about this. The letter was confiscated by the Swedes and used as evidence against Krabbe during the trial.

== Treason ==
That same year, the Scanian War Scanian War broke out and Krabbe was accused of collusion with the local resistance movement (the snaphaner) and of nurturing pro-Danish sympathies.

He had offered the Danish admirals Juel and Cornelis Tromp dinner when they reconquered the town of Ystad earlier that year and he had also been present when a unit of the Danish free corps "The King's Freeshooters" and local resistance men captured a group Swedes in his brother-in-law Holger Thott's orchard at Marsvinsholm Castle. One of the Swedes was a quite renowned Swedish soldier by the name of Major Adolf Fredrik Klingspor. The freeshooters/friskytter were units of light cavalry that were mainly recruited on a local Scanian basis and they were often sent out from Landtz Crone (now Landskrona) to troubled or threatened areas, and this was also the case this time. The Swedes considered these troops and the local resistance men traitors and "snapphanar" and collusion with the "snapphanar" normally meant death. Several of Krabbe's employees were among the local resistance men that attacked Klingspor and the others. Apart from the episode in the orchard, Krabbe's present Krogholm bailiff Christopher and his bailiff at Tosterup, Rasmus both rode with the freeshooters and led an attack on a Swedish quarter master by the name of Lorens Basch who had been sent out to collect taxes and war contributions in the area between Krogholm and Bollerup. Apart from Rasmus and Christopher, at least three of Krabbe's other employees had participated. Basch was arrested and sent to prison in Copenhagen together with a number of his men. Later, both Klingspor and Basch testified against Krabbe. In September 1677, Jörgen Krabbe and the Thott brothers went to the Danish Army Camp to ask for help to escape over to the Danish side. They felt stuck in a "laborint" (labyrinth) and claimed that the Swedes had threatened to drag them in chains to Stockholm. The background to this can be seen in the Swedish decision to "deport" the native Scanian nobility and gentry north of the border to Sweden. The Krabbe-Thott family wanted to avoid this fate at all costs, so they had decided to avoid what they called "the Babylonian Captivity" and move over to Denmark, if the Danes could get them out. On 24 September Krabbe travelled to the Swedish enclave at Malmö together with his cousin Christian Bilde of Dybäck, hoping to manage to convince the governor-general to let them stay in their homes after all, but instead, he was arrested and charged with high treason. Basch and Klingspor had been ransomed from their captivity in Denmark and were keen to get their revenge. On 6 November 1676, Krabbe was sentenced to lose his life, honour and property. He then spent several months in a cell at Malmö Castle before he was shot in Malmö's central square on 16 January 1678. He was buried inside the parish church at Tosterup, near Ystad. Krabbe's bailiff Christopher surrendered himself to the Swedes, claiming that he was the one who'd orchestrated the kidnappings of Basch and Klingspor. He had hoped that the Swedes would release the baron if they got their hands on 'the true culprit'. Instead, Christopher was kept prisoner for months, too, and he was executed at approximately the same time as Krabbe. We know that he was alive in December when both their coffins were placed side by side in the castle bailey.

The two younger Thott brothers were escorted out of Scania by a Danish military convoy. The eldest brother, Knud, had already betaken himself to Denmark on his own. Jytte Thott pleaded with King Charles XI of Sweden to pardon her husband, but the king answered that no amount of tears could save Krabbe. After his death, the court declared that Krabbe was the "Antesignanus"(leader and role model) of all Scanians. People in his home province followed his example, so the court could not let his turncoat behaviour pass. They also accused him for his "arga wäsende"(wrathful personality), cowardice and haughty attitude and they feared that his false insistence on being innocent would reach foreign lands and let people in the world believe his rather than the Swedes' version. Jytte Thott took to her bed and grieved her husband so deeply that she spent the rest of her life in black. She had to leave their home Krogholm Castle and moved to a smaller estate called Högested, where she had all the windows facing Krogholm walled up. As her property was largely taken over by Swedish creditors, she had to move to a farmstead called Baldringe where she spent her last years. Jörgen Krabbe and Jytte Thott had no children, and what was left of their property was inherited by their nephews and nieces.
