= Krageholm Castle =

Estate at Ystad Municipality in Scania, Sweden

- Krageholms slott
- Ystad Municipality
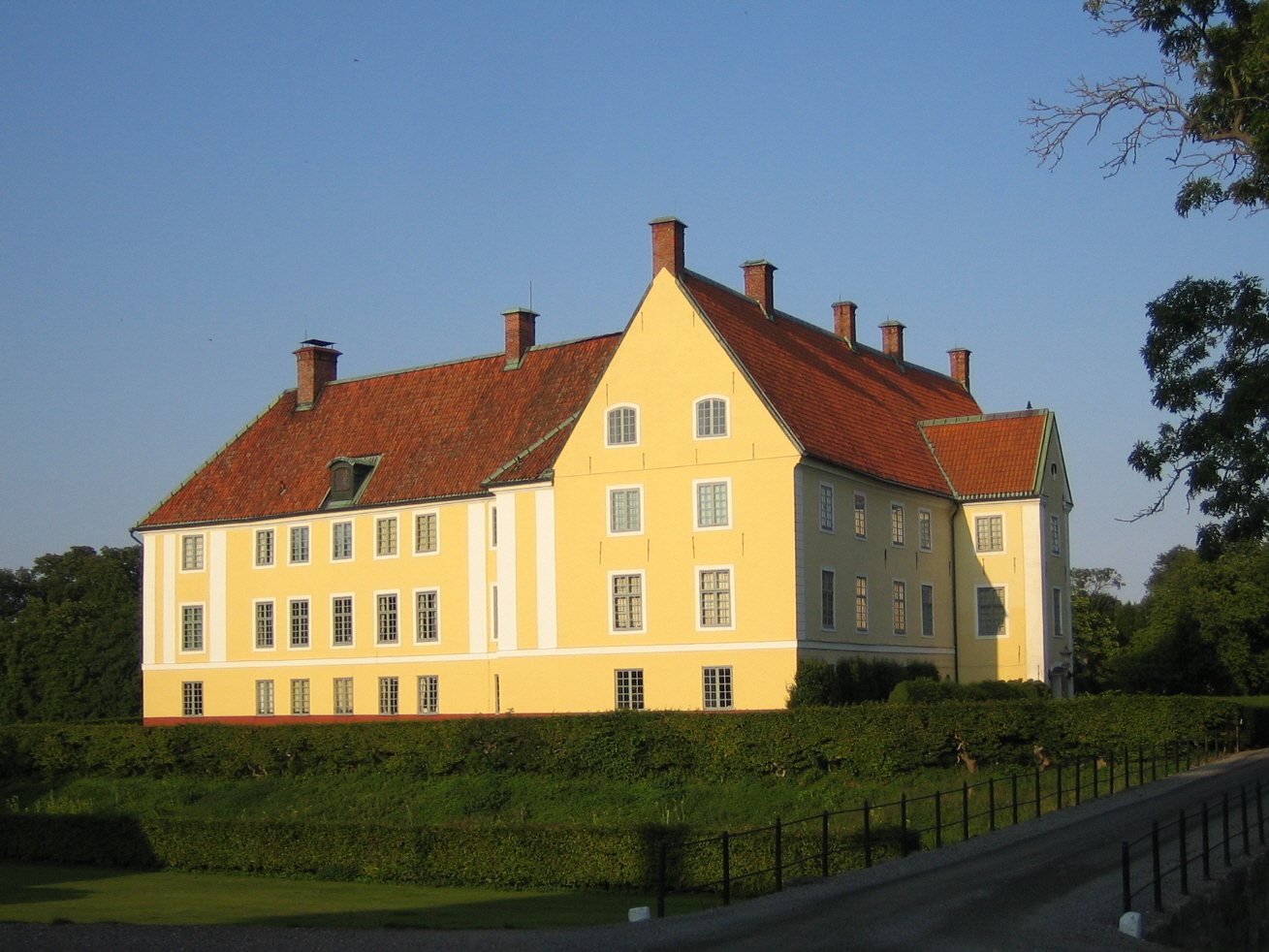
- Krageholm Castle

Site information
- Type: Castle
- Open to the public: By appointment only

Location
- Scania, Sweden
- Location within Skåne
- Coordinates: 55.4930°N 13.7656°E

Site history
- Built: 16th century

Krageholm Castle (Swedish: Krageholms slott) is an estate at Ystad Municipality in Scania, Sweden.

== History ==
The original estate castle is named in the 14th century as belonging to the Due family, and then to the Tott, Brahe, Marsvin and Krabbe families. In Danish times, the castle was called Krogholm and its most famous owner was Baron Jörgen Krabbe who was a native Scanian Dane who chose to pledge faith to the Swedish Crown when Scania was ceded to Sweden in 1658. During the Scanian war of 1676–1679, Krabbe was imprisoned and executed on the charge of collusion with the Danes and high treason. Several of his employees, including the estate manager Christopher, also got executed by the Swedes.

The castle was consequently contested by both Danish and Swedish troops and there was intense fighting on the castle grounds, including bombardments. Krabbe's widow, Jytte Thott, had to sell most of the family properties, including Krogholm, because they had been impoverished during the war. In 1704, the castle was sold to Carl Piper (1647–1716) and its name was changed to the more Swedish-sounding 'Krageholm' which it has kept all since. The castle was restored and remodeled in baroque by Carl Piper's widow Christina Piper (1673–1752) in the 1720s, who used it as her main residence until her death in 1752. The castle belonged to the Piper family in 1752–1897, the Brahe family 1907–30 and since then again to the Piper family.

== See also ==
- List of castles in Sweden
- Sövestad Runestones
