= Jordberga Castle =

Manor house in Trelleborg, Sweden

- Jordberga slott
- Trelleborg Municipality
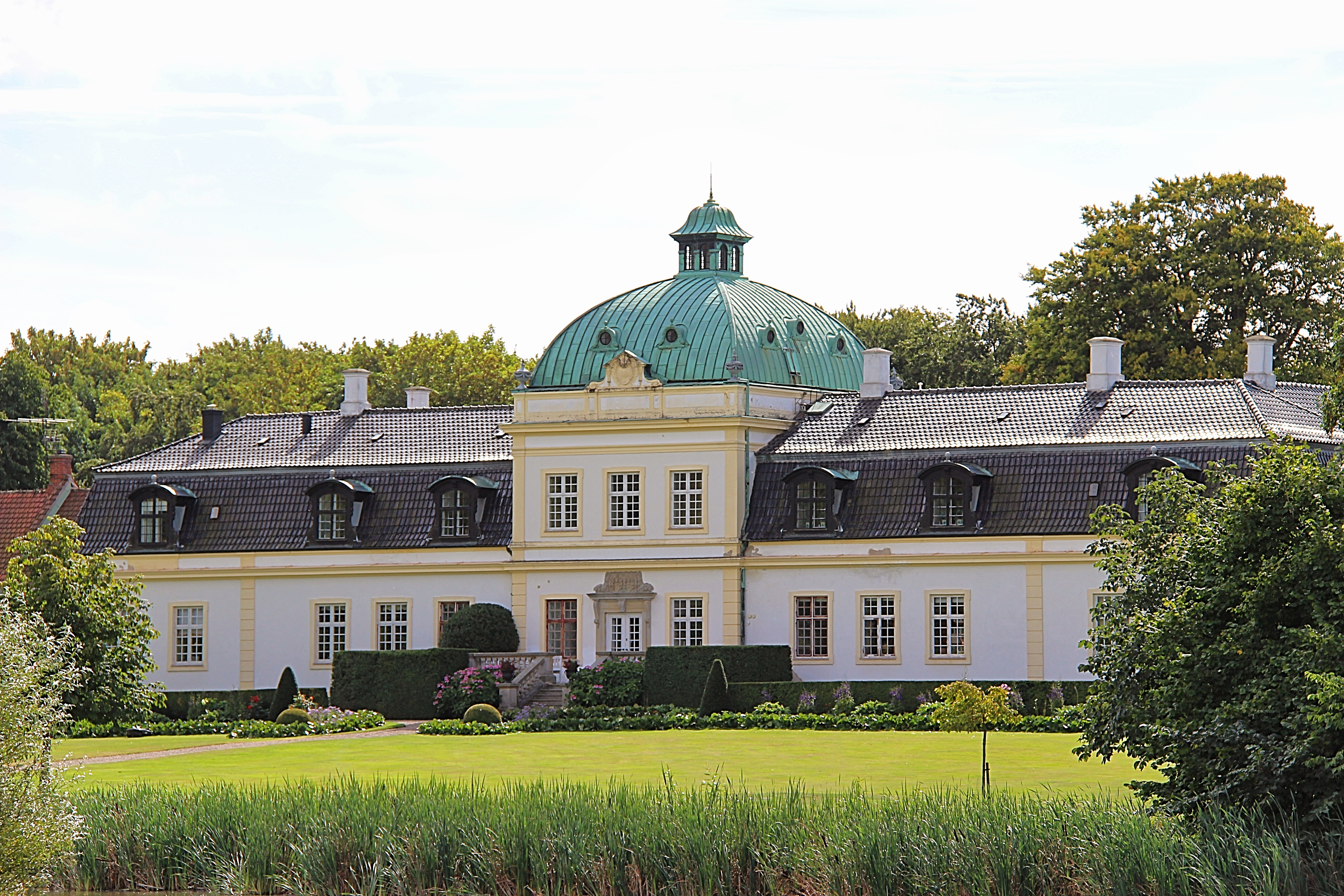
- Jordberga Castle

Site information
- Owner: Otto von Arnold
- Open to the public: By appointment only

Location
- Scania, Sweden
- Coordinates: 55.415°N 13.415556°E

Site history
- Built: 1908

Jordberga Castle (Swedish: Jordberga slott) is a manor house in Trelleborg Municipality in the Scania (Skåne) region in southern Sweden.

== History ==
The estate dates to the 1400s. Jordberga was bought in 1811 by Governor Eric von Nolcken (1763–1834) and inherited by his son Carl Adam von Nolcken (1811–1857) who had the main house built in Gothic style under design by Swedish architect Carl Georg Brunius (1793–1869). Carl Gustaf Stjernswärd (1844–1896) had the main house re-built in 1908. It was designed in Art Nouveau baroque style by Danish architect Henri Carl August Glæsel (1853–1921).

== See also ==
- List of castles in Sweden
