= March Across the Belts =

Swedish military campaign

- Part of the Dano-Swedish War of 1657–58
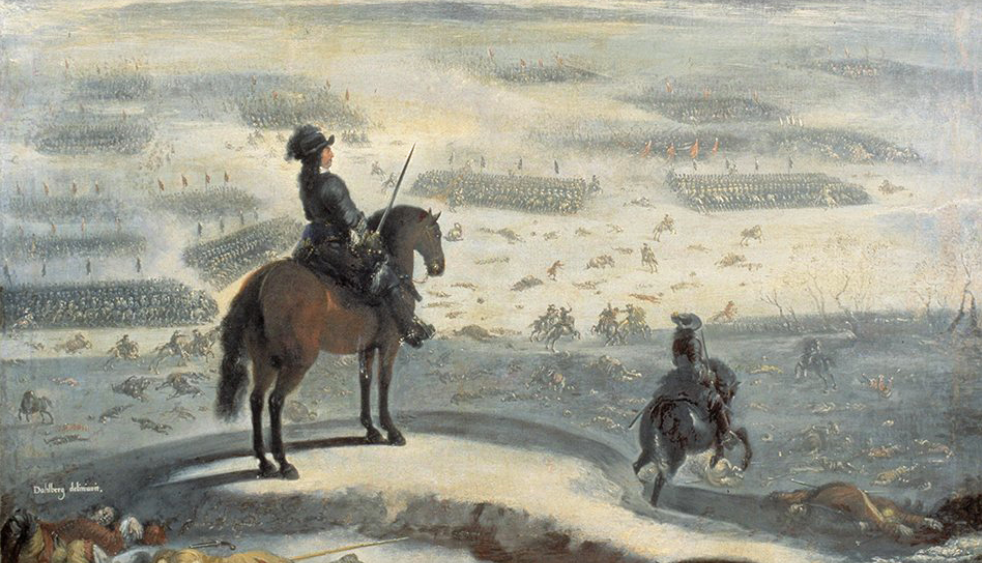
- Charles X Gustav after the battle of Iversnæs, by Johann Philip Lemke.
Date	30 January – 15 February 1658 (Note: The dates in this article are according to the Julian calendar, which was used in Sweden until the year 1700 when it was changed to the Swedish calendar. According to the Gregorian calendar, the campaign lasted from 9 February to 25 February 1658, and the Treaty of Roskilde was signed on 8 March 1658.)
Location	Danish Straits
Result	Swedish victory
Territorial changes	Scania, Blekinge, Halland, Bornholm, Bohuslän and Trøndelag annexed by Sweden

Belligerents
Swedish Empire	Denmark–Norway

Commanders and leaders
(Swedish Empire) Charles X Gustav; (Swedish Empire) Carl Gustaf Wrangel	(Denmark–Norway) Ulrik Christian Gyldenløve (POW) (Denmark–Norway) Jens von Løwenklau (surrendered)

Strength
Across the Little Belt: 6,000–12,000 men Across the Great Belt: 7,500 men 20 cannons	On Funen: 5,000 men 4 ships On Lolland: 2,250 men At Copenhagen: 10,200 men

Casualties and losses
Unknown; Two cavalry squadrons drowned	Heavy losses

The March Across the Belts (Swedish: Tåget över Bält) was a military campaign waged by the Swedish Empire across the ice between the Danish islands. It lasted between 30 January and 15 February 1658, ending with a decisive victory for Swedish King Charles X Gustav during his first Danish war.

On 5 June 1657, Denmark declared war on Sweden which was under heavy pressure in the Second Northern War against Poland and Russia. Although Charles X Gustav was deeply involved in the conflict with the Polish–Lithuanian Commonwealth, he chose to move the bulk of his army to Jutland and invade Denmark. The king's rapid march surprised the Danish troops, whose main body was forced to retreat to the fortress of Frederiksodde. The Swedes attacked and conquered Frederiksodde on 27 October. With Jutland secured, Charles X Gustav sought to continue his campaign towards Copenhagen on Zealand, but the Danish Straits and the Danish navy obstructed him. Since the 17th century was the coldest during the Little Ice Age, with the winters in Scandinavia being exceptionally frigid, the king planned to take advantage of the weather by remaining in Jutland until sufficient ice had built up to support the weight of his troops, and then carry out a risky march across the ice.

After investigating the ice conditions, the king began his march on 30 January 1658 from Jutland across the strait of the Little Belt to Funen. Swedish troops defeated the Danes at Tybrind Vig and Iversnæs and occupied Funen after a few days. To avert the risk that his troops would be isolated on Funen, Charles X Gustav investigated the possibility of crossing the ice of the Great Belt to Zealand. On 5 February the ice at southern Funen was deemed sufficiently thick, and the king decided to cross to Langeland. He continued through Lolland and Falster and reached Zealand on 11 February. With Swedish troops standing 22 kilometres (14 mi) from Copenhagen on 15 February, King Frederick III of Denmark chose to make an unconditional peace with Sweden, ending the Swedish campaign.

Charles X Gustav's gamble ended with a catastrophic defeat for Denmark. The resulting Treaty of Roskilde, signed on 26 February 1658, was highly favorable for Sweden. Denmark ceded Scania, Blekinge, Halland, Bohuslän, Bornholm and Trøndelag to Sweden. Bornholm and Trøndelag were returned to Denmark in 1660 after Charles X Gustav's failed attempt to defeat Denmark completely in a second war. In its historiography, several historians have highlighted the campaign and the resulting peace treaty as the events that gave Sweden its current "natural" borders. Likewise, the events gave rise to a polarised debate over the role of quartermaster general Erik Dahlbergh in the king's decision to march across the Great Belt.

== Background ==
In 1655, King Charles X Gustav began a campaign against the Polish–Lithuanian Commonwealth to force King John II Casimir Vasa to renounce all claims to the Swedish crown, as well as conquer the Polish provinces of Courland and Prussia. The Swedish Empire would be expanded, while the control of the lucrative Baltic Sea trade strengthened. However, the war against Poland was slow. Despite several tactical victories on the battlefield, including the conquest of Warsaw, Charles X Gustav was unable to bring the war to an end. The Poles resisted the Swedish troops, who were being ambushed constantly by Polish guerrilla units. Poland's neighbors threatened to get involved in the war. Both Austria and the Netherlands sent military aid to Poland, and Sweden's former ally, Brandenburg-Prussia, changed sides during the conflict. In 1656, Russian troops had crossed the border into Swedish Livonia and besieged Riga.

In 1657, Denmark was ready to attack Sweden, seeing an opportunity to tear up the Treaty of Brömsebro signed in 1645, when they were forced to cede to Sweden the provinces of Gotland, Saaremaa, Jämtland and Härjedalen, including Halland for a 30-year period. But the Danish command, led by King Frederick III, realized that they were not strong enough to confront Sweden on their own. Denmark tried to gather allies from Poland, Austria, and the Netherlands, and by summer 1657 the situation seemed very advantageous to Denmark. On 5 June 1657, the Danish fodermarsk (Note: The task of the Fodermarsk was to assist in maintaining good order at the royal court, to be in charge of the royal stable, but also to participate in particular in the placement of the warriors in castle camps.) Christian Wiborg handed over the formal declaration of war to Governor Erik Stenbock in Halmstad, which later reached Charles X Gustav's field camp in Thorn on 20 June. The Swedish army was involved deeply in the wars against both Poland and Russia, and the Danes were able to use this to put further pressure on Sweden. As an increasingly precarious situation emerged around them, Charles X Gustav and his advisers sought a suitable solution to the Polish conflict. A quick victory over Denmark would strengthen Sweden's position and hopefully dissuade other powers, mainly Austria, from deeper involvement in the Polish conflict.

=== Campaign in Jutland and the assault on Frederiksodde ===
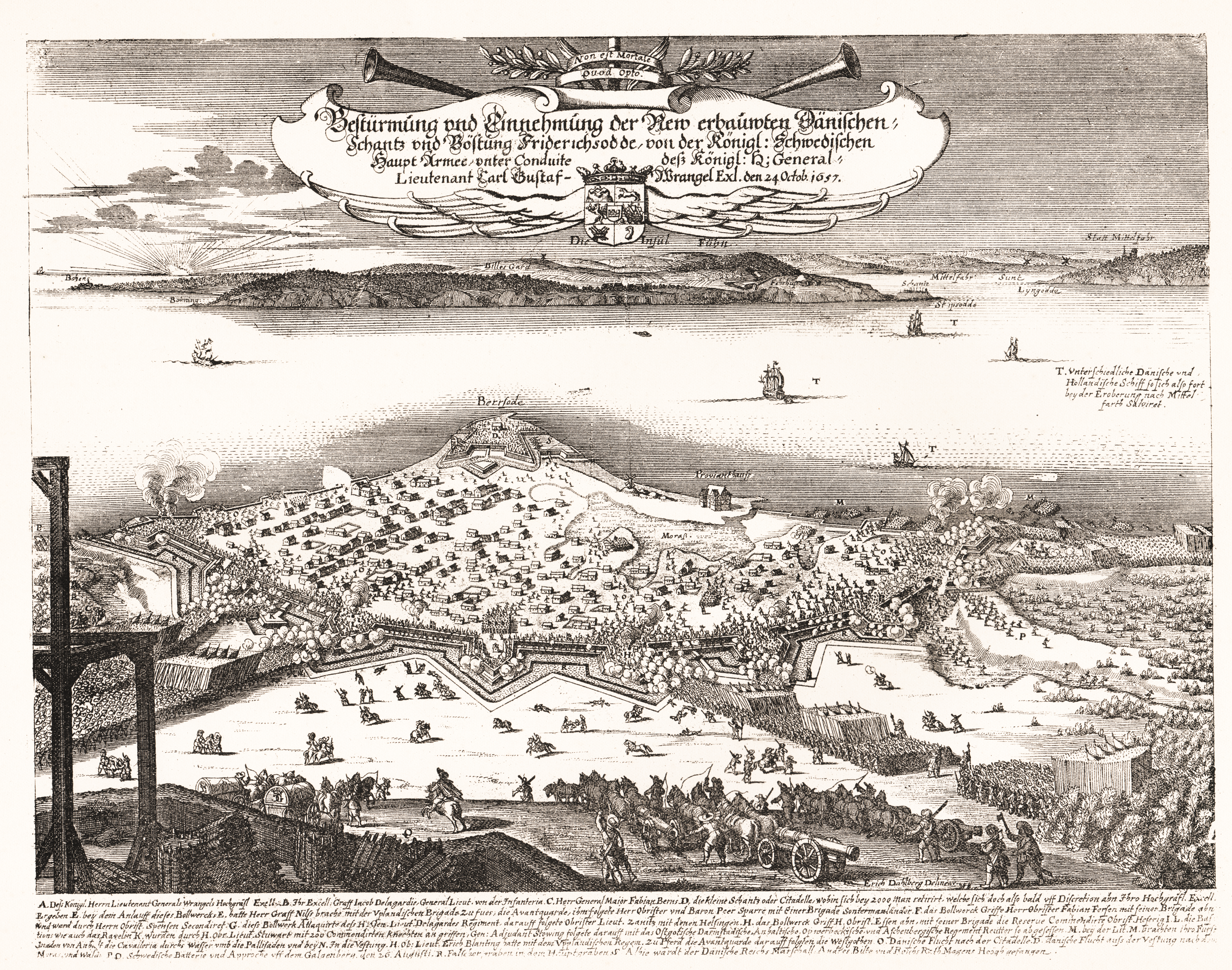
Contemporary chalcography of the assault on Frederiksodde on 24 October 1657.

Charles X Gustav sought to avoid ending up in a second stalemate, in a protracted war without a decisive opportunity in sight. He marched his army rapidly from Poland through Pomerania, towards Jutland. The king's army numbered about 17,000 men; only 4,000 were Swedes while the majority were foreign mercenaries. By 25 August the Swedish army stood outside the Danish fortress of Frederiksodde, on the east coast of southern Jutland. Smaller Danish forces had been defeated along the way, but no decisive victory had been achieved, and the Danish leadership felt secure in their belief that Frederiksodde would protect the Danish islands. The war took place on other fronts. Swedish troops under Per Brahe the Younger and Gustaf Otto Stenbock fought the Danish troops garrisoned in Scania and Halland, and in Bohuslän and Jämtland during the so-called Krabbefejden ("The Krabbe feud", named after Danish military officer Iver Krabbe). After the inconclusive battle at Møn during the autumn of 1657, the Swedish navy returned to their base in Stockholm for the winter. The Danish navy also prepared to cease operations before the winter. Both parties seemed to agree the stalemate would persist during the cold months.

Charles X Gustav knew that the Swedish army found itself in a vulnerable situation in Jutland and wished to regain the initiative in the war by acting swiftly. On 24 October 1657 during the siege of Fredriksodde, a determined Swedish force led by Field Marshal Carl Gustaf Wrangel unexpectedly assaulted. The fortress fell, and the entire Danish garrison—involving several of the Danish army's best regiments—surrendered. Marshal of the Realm Anders Bille was captured and died a few weeks later. As the Swedes now controlled all of Jutland, the fall of Frederiksodde was deemed disastrous for Denmark, which had lost control to the Danish islands. During the period after the assault on Frederiksodde, the Swedish command felt insecure, fearing an attack from Brandenburg against Swedish Pomerania and then against the army stationed in Jutland. It was urgent to force Denmark to capitulate to prevent the war from turning against them: hence the Swedes set an assault on Copenhagen as their main objective. But to get there, they needed to find a way across to the island of Funen. The Danish troops on the island understood an invasion attempt was imminent.

== Ice investigations along the Little Belt ==
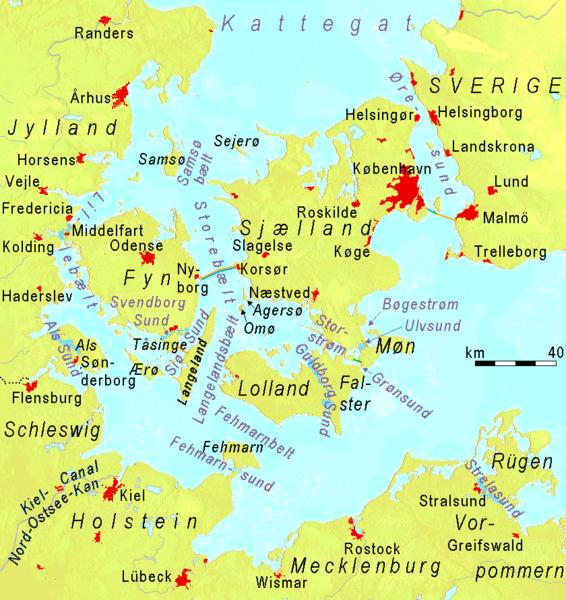
Map of the Danish Islands between Jutland and Scania.

The preparation of a detailed plan for the crossing was delegated to Carl Gustaf Wrangel, who would also prepare for possible Danish landing attempts on Jutland. On 9 January 1658, Charles X Gustav held a military conference in Kiel with his senior officers and civilian officials, including Wrangel, count palatine Philip Florinus of Sulzbach and Margrave Charles Magnus of Baden-Durlach. During the conference, most of its participants agreed the Swedes would conduct a landing operation on Funen, with a small squadron of five warships from Wismar led by skeppsmajor Tönnes Specht. By mid-December 1657, the squadron had assembled in Sønderborg and seized several transport vessels from Vendsyssel and Samsø that were carrying grain to Lübeck. But the ice cover came closer every day, and it was uncertain whether the entire Swedish cavalry could be transferred across the strait. As ice spread quickly and the cold persisted, getting to Funen with transport ships became impossible. This left only one alternative—a march across the frozen Little Belt, the strait between Jutland and Funen. Several conference participants reported ice formations along Jutland's east coast, at Assens' ferry, at Haderslev, and at Flensburg.

Between 22 and 23 January, Charles X Gustav sent orders to his senior officers to investigate the ice around Funen and find a crossing to Ærø, and onward to Funen and Langeland. On 24 January, Wrangel reported he rode on horseback along the coast from Kolding to Frederiksodde and that the water was completely open. The army command deliberated about crossing the ice towards the Ærø strait at Assens on Funen, a good distance south of Frederiksodde. Swedish scouts rode out on the ice east of Øsby and spotted Assens, but they made the assessment the ice was still too weak to cross. Another reconnaissance patrol was dispatched from Als towards Ærø, but they established the strait was open and was filled with ice floes.

On the morning of 26 January, a Swedish patrol of five men crossed the ice to the island of Brandsø, 2 kilometres (1.2 mi) from Jutland's east coast. On the island, they were surprised by 15 Danish horsemen; four of the Swedes were captured, but one escaped and reported the incident to Wrangel. He immediately sent a unit of 50 horsemen and 150 infantry under Adjutant General Friedrich von Arensdorff to the island. On the evening of 27 January, Arensdorff returned and reported the Danish horsemen abandoned Brandsø and fled back to Funen across the ice. The distance between Frederiksodde and Funen was just over 4 kilometres (2.5 mi) at its narrowest point, and 17 kilometres (11 mi) at its widest. Charles X Gustav ordered the occupation of Brandsø with 100 men, later reinforced with an additional 300 men.

On 28 January, Wrangel marched with the cavalry out of Frederiksodde to Hejls close to Hejlsminde Bay, where the rest of the cavalry arrived on 29 January. They planned to start the ice march from a place between the villages of Anslet and Knudshöfft, 6 kilometres (3.7 mi) south of Hejls. On 28 January, Charles X Gustav reached Haderslev and received reports from Wrangel about his route map. The king approved his plan, giving Wrangel permission to begin the march without the king and his troops, provided that the ice was deemed sufficiently thick. The king arrived at Hejls on 29 January: Wrangel had not yet set out. Later that day, a detachment of between 500 and 600 troops was sent across the ice to scout the road to Funen. The force reached the foreland of Iversnæs on the other side of the strait occupied by Danish troops. They had constructed two redoubts and additional fortifications and ordered Danish farmers to create a moat by tearing up the ice close to the shore. A strong current was discovered at the shore, creating a broken ice channel. The Danes spotted the Swedish force and bombarded it with their cannon. On the evening of 29 January, quartermaster general Erik Dahlbergh was dispatched to test the ice on the narrowest strait at Middelfart. During a nighttime observation, he found the ice sufficiently thick for an entire army to cross and raced back to the king with his report. But Charles X Gustav had already decided the army would cross the ice towards Iversnæs, ordering his troops to prepare to march the following morning. During the night, he dispatched troops to build bridges with boards and straw across weaker ice sections and gaps beyond Brandsø. Reconnaissance patrols were sent both north and south of Iversnæs to take measurements of the current. The Swedes planned to cross the ice in a relatively scattered formation, to minimize the risk of the ice breaking under them. This created a dilemma as the Danes on Funen could locate and strike the approaching Swedish isolated units quickly.

== Order of battle ==
=== Swedish army ===
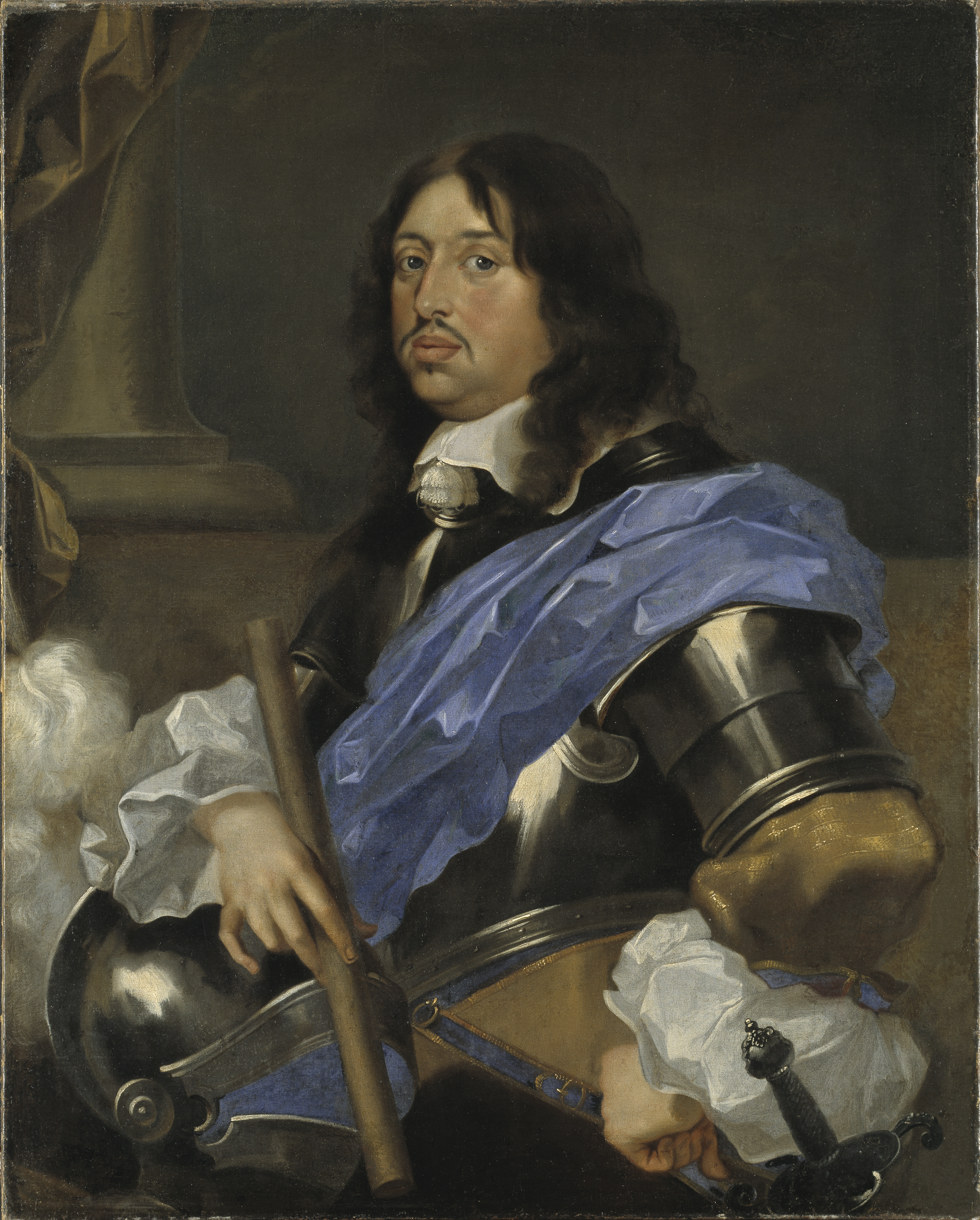
King Charles X Gustav (1652–1653) by Sébastien Bourdon.

On the morning of Saturday, 30 January, Charles X Gustav moved out with his army to Brandsø. Then the army was lined up on the ice. According to one source his troops numbered between 6,000 and 7,000 men, according to others up to 12,000 men. The cavalry was grouped into two wings. Carl Gustaf Wrangel, together with Lieutenant General Clas Tott, led the right wing of 1,500 men, while the left wing with 2,300 men was under the king's command. But as the king moved back and forth between the units, Major General Fabian Berendes held the direct command of the left wing. The infantry, under the command of Lieutenant General Jakob Kasimir De la Gardie, advanced behind the cavalry and took a different and longer route across the ice, carrying both the artillery and baggage train. As a result, they were unable to take part in the battle against the Danes. All units planned to converge at Tybrind Vig north of Iversnæs, approximately 5 kilometres (3.1 mi) from Brandsø.

More than 40 Swedish regiments were to advance towards Funen. Due to battle casualties and disease, the strength of some regiments had fallen to a few dozen men, while others amounted to 500 men or more. The Drabant Corps, the king's elite guards, marched at the head of the cavalry. The cavalry consisted of the Småland, Uppland, Västergötland and Östergötland cavalry regiments. From Finland came Fabian Berendes' dragoons from Åboland, Henrik Horn's cavalry from Tavastia, and cavalry from Turku and Pori Province under the command of Colonel Gustaf Kurck. The infantry consisted of the Hälsinge, Kalmar, Kronoberg, Närke-Värmland, Skaraborg, Södermanland and Uppland regiments. They were spearheaded by the Life Guards, where Swedish guardsmen were mixed with several hundred enlisted German soldiers, who filled the ranks of the regiment severely depleted by plague whilst garrisoned in the Polish city of Thorn.

=== Danish army ===
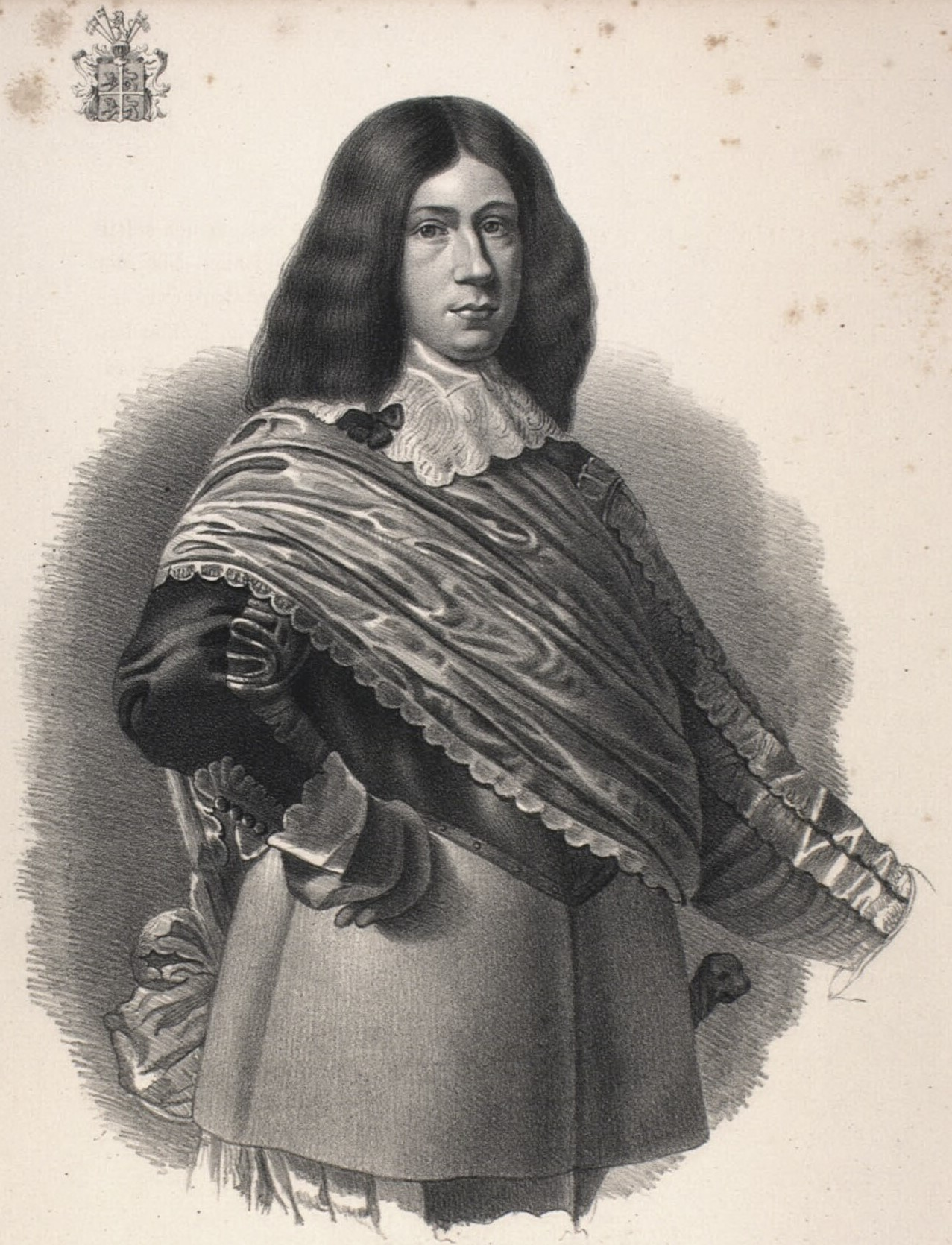
Ulrik Christian Gyldenløve.

Disorder and shortcomings arose among the Danish troops. Their commander, Ulrik Christian Gyldenløve, half-brother of King Frederick III, had little experience as a military commander. The Danes lacked experienced native officers, and the cohesive command link was broken as officers came from the Netherlands, France, Scotland, and the German states. The Danes suffered a severe shortage of clothes, food and grain, since stores previously sent to Frederiksodde ended up in Swedish hands. The Danish units were by necessity garrisoned in towns and villages around Funen, quickly consuming all the surplus provisions stored there. Sailors were put ashore from the Danish warships, but they were poorly dressed and suffered from frostbite. The lack of fodder in Funen meant several horses on the island died of starvation, which forced a cavalry regiment from Zealand to leave their horses during their transportation to Funen. Gyldenløve had roughly 5,000 men scattered throughout the island. Of these, 3,000 were cavalry, while the rest were infantry and conscripted peasants. Given the problems spreading across the island, the actual strength was on paper. Gyldenløve became ill and unable to ride a horse, which resulted in his being forced to transfer command to Major General Jens von Løwenklau. About 4,500 men were stationed at Iversnæs, of whom 1,500 were conscripted peasants. Løwenklau established his headquarters in Wedellsborg seat farm near Iversnæs.

== March across the Little Belt ==
=== Battles at Tybrind Vig and Iversnæs ===
On the morning of 30 January, the Danes located the Swedish vanguard, consisting of 400 cavalrymen under Colonel Casper Borneman, who rode out towards Tybrind Vig. 200 detached dragoons who used sleds to carry beams, boards, ladders, barrels, and straw to build bridges across gaps and weaker ice sections accompanied Borneman. After their discovery, the Danes dispatched some of their units from Iversnæs to Tybrind Vig, where they clashed with the Swedish scouts. The church bells rang across Funen, warning the Swedes were on their way. The Swedish soldiers put straw on their hats as a sign of identification and handed out the password: "Help, Jesus!".

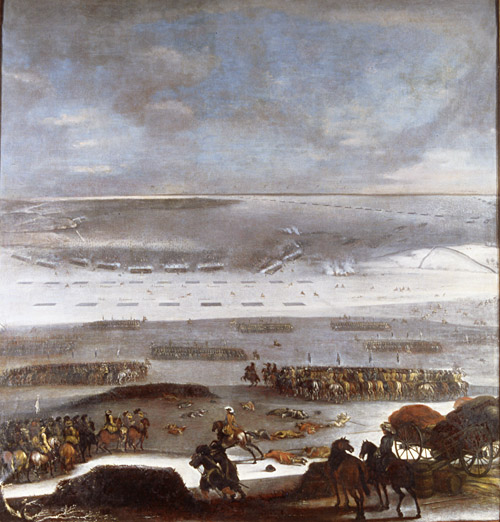
March Across the Little Belt and the Battle of Ivesnaes 1658. Painting (1693) by Johann Philip Lemke.

Wrangel's wing began to march across the ice. Charles X Gustav halted his wing as a tactical reserve in case the Danes conducted a counterattack across the ice against the Swedish baggage train in Brandsø. Such an attack never came, and the left wing later moved out to the ice. Of the nine Danish cavalry companies guarding Funen's coastline from Middelfart to Langeland, three to four were ordered to move northward towards Iversnæs, however, they failed to arrive on time. Borneman's vanguard rode to Tybrind Vig, encircled the beach, and tore up Hannibal Sehested's Danish cavalry regiment. Out on the ice, the king observed Danish reinforcements arriving from Iversnæs and decided to unite his cavalry wing with Wrangel's units.

The Danish cavalry lined up in battle formation on both sides of the small infantry force and their artillery. Charles X Gustav tried to make a two-pronged attack from the ice and on land. Wrangel was ordered to make a straight attack with parts of his wing on the beach towards the Danish front. The other half of his wing was transferred to a northward path towards the king's wing. They rode ashore on Ruds Cape north of Tybrind Vig and, under the cover of a forest, encircled and struck the Danes from the north and east. While Wrangel's wing rode towards the shore, the ice broke up in patches behind them, and two cavalry squadrons from Waldeck's and Königsmarck's German regiments disappeared into the water. The ice cracked under the king's hunting sled, and the whole crew, his personal bodyguard and three draft horses fell into the water and drowned. The king, however, had already left his sled and mounted a horse to lead the attack on the shore.

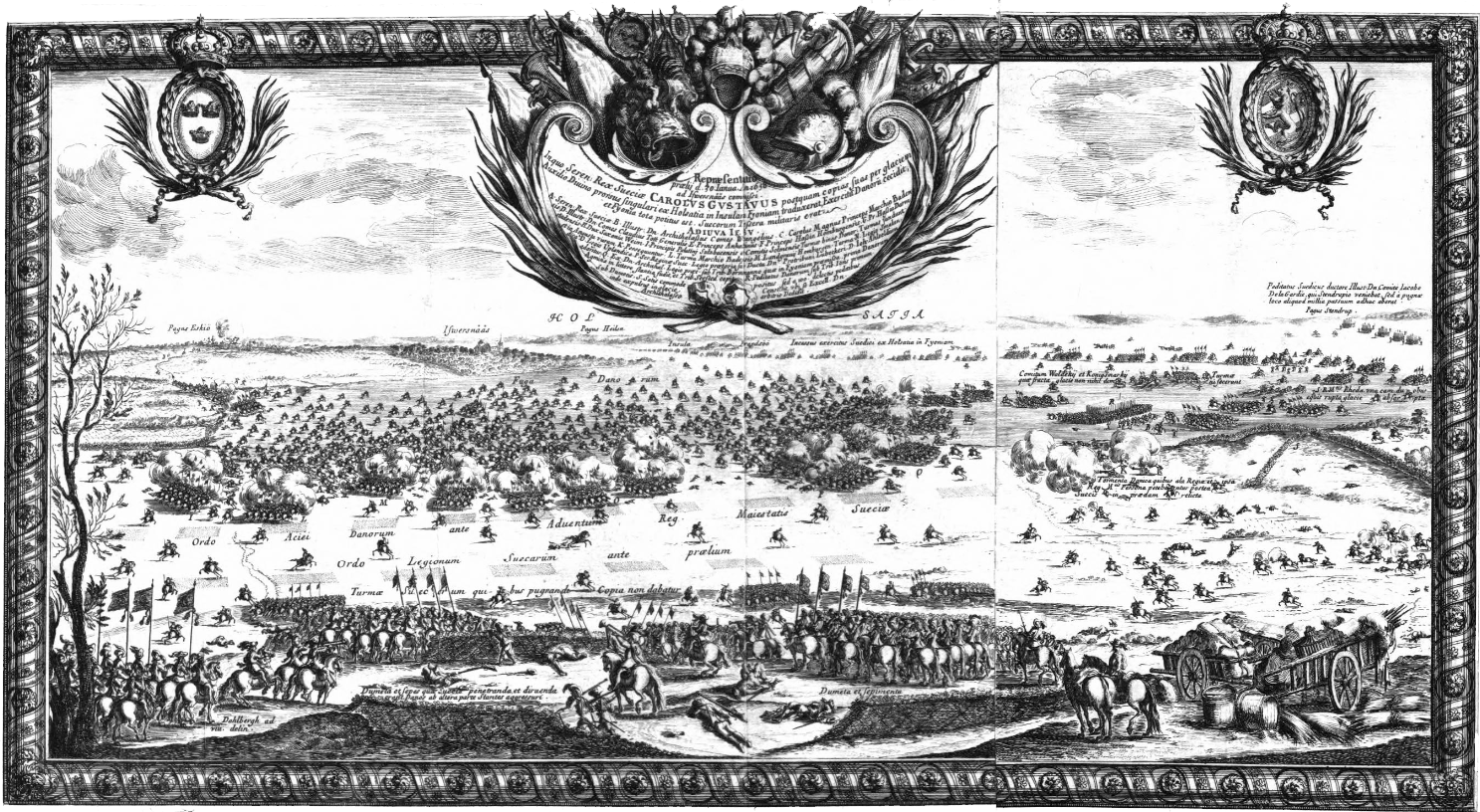
Battle of Iversnæs. Chalcography (1658) by Erik Dahlbergh.

During the battle, Danish Major General von Ahlefeldt spotted Charles X Gustav and aimed his cannons towards him. Several cannonballs hit the ice in front of the king's horse, and a cannonball threw up debris that slightly damaged the king's left eye. Dahlbergh rode by his side and survived unscathed. Shortly afterwards, the king rode up to a small hill to monitor the Swedish cavalry attacks, and a few Danes surrounded him, but Dahlbergh quickly gathered support to drive them off.

Wrangel was under heavy pressure from the Danes: Charles X Gustav detected this and sent Tott with the Uppland Cavalry Regiment to reinforce him. The Swedish attack on the beach and around the Danish line of defense succeeded, and it collapsed. Von Løwenklau realized his troops would be crushed between the two Swedish wings. He rode up to Wrangel, whom he knew from before, and demanded quarter for him and his soldiers, which was granted. The battle was over by ten o'clock in the morning. Of the five Danish cavalry regiments lined up along the shore, only two remained intact after the short battle. An unknown number of Danish soldiers were killed, but the majority surrendered and were captured. Swedish losses during the battle were relatively small, apart from Waldeck's and Königsmarck's squadrons, who fell through the ice. The king's gamble succeeded through an operation that took only a few hours to accomplish.

Charles X Gustav now established his bridgehead on Funen and unit after unit arrived on solid ground, including the artillery and the baggage train. A large part of the cavalry moved inland to pursue the scattered Danish troops fleeing the battle. The peasant assembly at Iversnæs broke down as Swedish units under Tott attacked them from Tybrind Vig. Several peasants were cut down before most of them surrendered to the superior Swedish forces.

=== Occupation of Funen ===
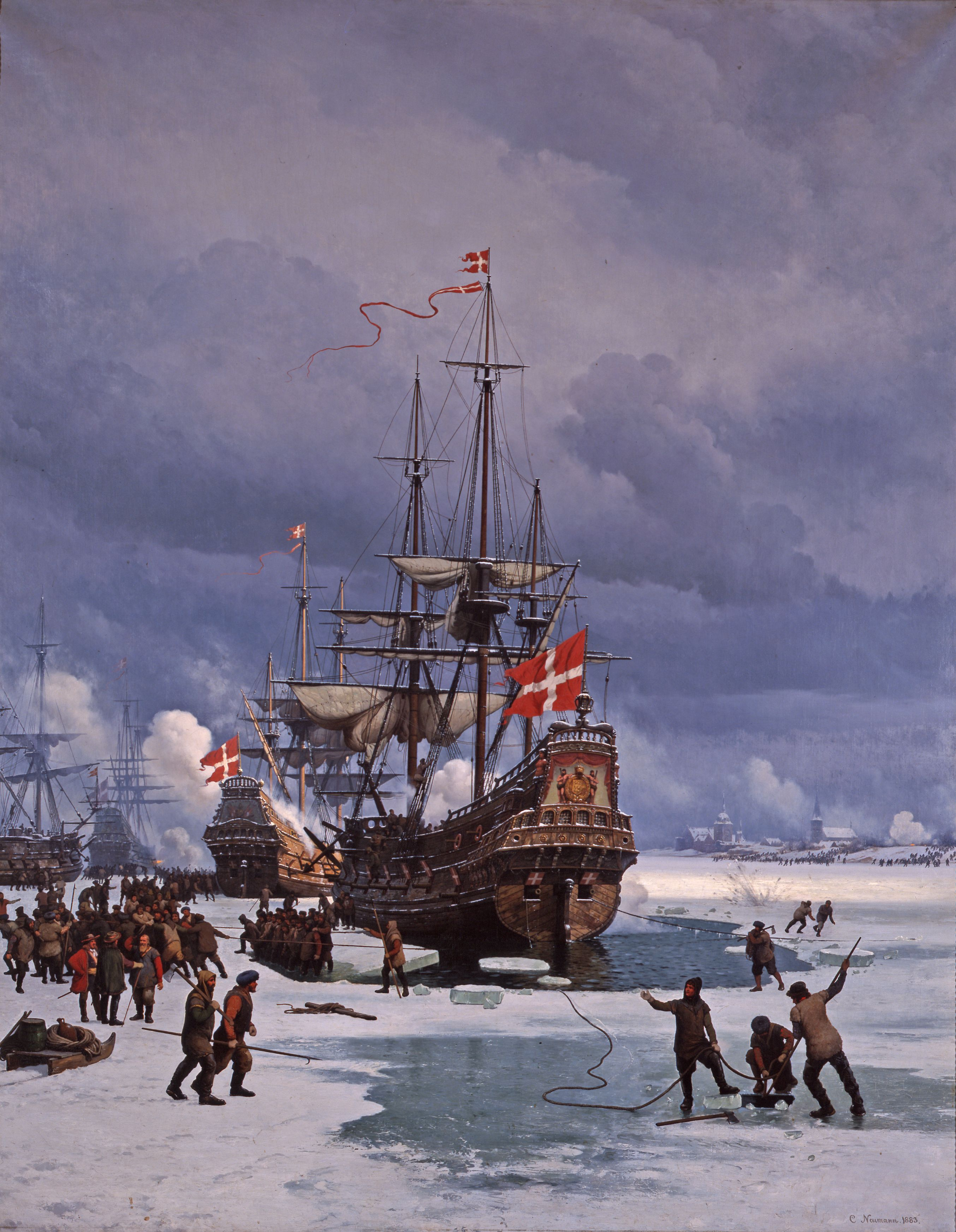
Peter Bredal takes his ships out of the ice at Nyborg, by Carl Neumann.

When news of the successful Swedish landing spread across the island, the Danish resistance was broken. Smaller Danish units in various places around Funen surrendered, or the soldiers simply returned to their homes. A few Danish cavalrymen crossed the ice to Zealand, after stealing property from farmers or looting the Danish crown's stashes of collected tax funds. On the evening of 30 January, Major Sylcke and 150 Swedish cavalrymen from Wittenberg's cavalry regiment rode into Odense. The city was unfortified and guarded by a small Danish cavalry force under the command of Colonel Steen Bille, which was disarmed after a short battle. Gyldenløve was also in Odense and was captured along with Danish officials Iver Vind, Jørgen Brahe, Gunde Rosenkrantz and Henrik Rantzau. On 31 January, Swedish troops captured Nyborg without a fight, along with official Otte Krag and several senior Danish officers. Large parts of the Danish government fell into Swedish captivity. The officers were sent to prison camps in Frederiksodde, while some higher-ranking Danes were allowed to keep their swords and move freely around Funen.

After reaching Funen, another Swedish unit under Colonel Rutger von Ascheberg moved north and entered Middelfart. At Hindsgavl's Castle, 2 kilometres (1.2 mi) north of Middelfart, 450 German mercenaries in Danish service under Major General Hindricksson surrendered. The mercenaries chose to transfer into Swedish service, while the Swedes captured 60 cannons and a significant amount of ammunition and provisions. Farther south, Assens was captured and plundered by a Swedish infantry unit. Dahlbergh was dispatched south with a company of the Östergötland Cavalry Regiment under Rittmeister Claes Niethoff. They spent the night in Faaborg and reached Svendborg, which Berendes and his two Finnish regiments had taken on 31 January. Berendes had previously surprised four Danish cavalry companies arriving from Langeland in Funen's defense. The Danes retreated after a brief battle.

On the evening of 31 January, Wrangel's cavalry unit reached Nyborg after completing a rapid 50 kilometres (31 mi) march across Funen. Despite Nyborg being strongly fortified, the Danish garrison surrendered offering no resistance. Only four frozen Danish ships and their crew, under the command of Vice Admiral Peter Bredal, remained untouched. Wrangel sent Major Christer Lillieberg to Bredal to persuade him to surrender, but he chose to fight. Swedish troops lined their cannons along the shore, and the Swedes and the Danish ships bombarded each other for several days. On 2 February the Danish sailors managed to saw open a gap in the ice, pull the ships out of range of the Swedish cannons, and sail back to Copenhagen, ending the hostilities on Funen.

=== Aftermath and peace offer ===
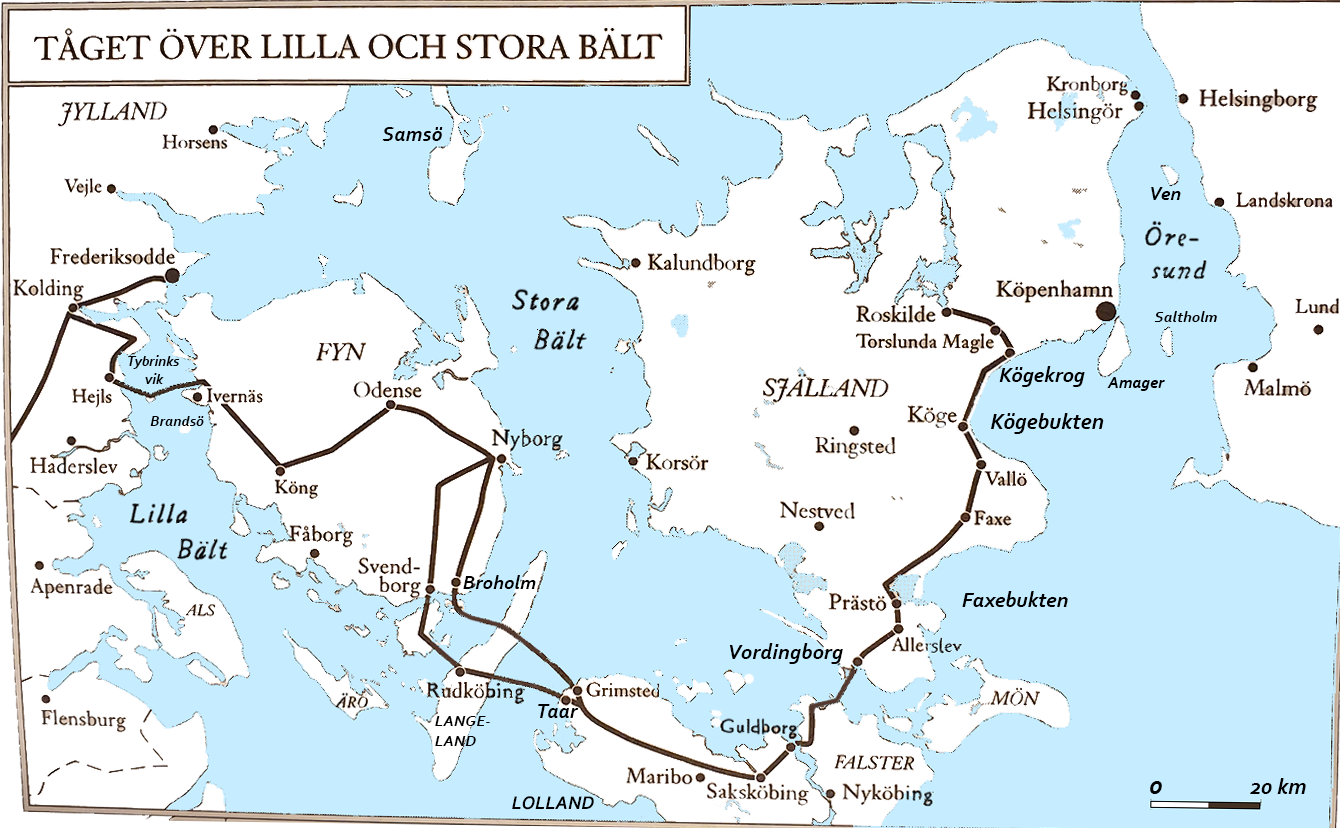
Map of the campaign across the Little and Great Belts.

Following the landing at Tybrind Vig, Charles X Gustav went to the village of Eskør, which became a gathering point for the Swedish units. The king refused to wait for the infantry and artillery, who were still marching out on the ice, but ordered their commanders to march south after their landing and secure Assens. The king broke camp from Eskør with the cavalry. He arrived at Køng, where Dahlbergh established the Swedish units' night quarters, and a vicarage belonging to Vicar Henning Clausen Bang accommodated the royal company. There, Charles X Gustav held a council of war with Wrangel, the Margrave of Baden-Durlach, the Danish defector Corfitz Ulfeldt (Note: Corfitz Ulfeldt was the former steward of the Realm, who in the early 1650s fled to Sweden following a power struggle with the Danish Privy council, which had the support of King Frederick III.) and some other senior officers. The deliberations were mainly about a possible march towards Zealand. On 31 January, the king arrived in Odense, where Bishop Laurids Jacobsen Hindsholm, Mayor Thomas Brodersen Risbrich and several priests and civil servants received him. The king spent the night in Mayor Risbrich's manor on Overgade No. 11 in Odense, but on 1 February the king moved to the monastery of Dalum. The vicar in Dalum, Niels Bang, had his vicarage plundered by Swedish horsemen, who let themselves be accommodated there.

From the monastery, Charles X Gustav sent letters with the news of the successful conquest of Funen to Duke Frederick III of Holstein-Gottorp, Philip Florinus of Sulzbach, and Mathias Biörenclou, the Swedish minister in Frankfurt am Main. They spread the message to England's ambassadors in The Hague and Paris. The French ambassador, Hugues Terlon, participated in the campaign, writing a 13-page report in Dalum which he sent to Cardinal Jules Mazarin in Paris. News of the march across the Little Belt and the collapse of the Danish defense spread across Europe. On 1 February, news of the loss of Funen reached Copenhagen: according to the English ambassador Philip Meadows, this sent shock waves through the capital's inner circles. King Frederick III wrote a proposal for a ceasefire and promised English mediation for a peace between Sweden and Denmark on 3 February. During the following weeks, Meadows worked diligently to create peace between the countries, as the war affected trade in the Baltic Sea, including Skagerrak and Kattegat, and a further escalation could result in a major war involving Austria, Brandenburg, England and France. The peace offer was sent to Wrangel at Nyborg on 4 February with one of Meadows' envoys. Wrangel forwarded him to the king's quarters in Odense, where he arrived that evening.

== Ice investigations along the Great Belt ==
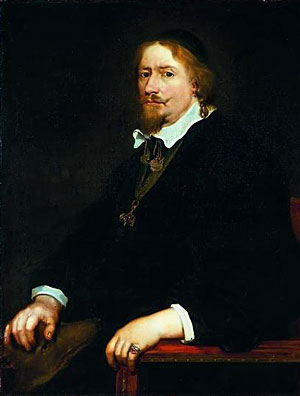
Corfitz Ulfeldt (1653) by Sébastien Bourdon.

The conquest of Funen opened interesting opportunities for the Swedish army, as did the conquest of the fortified city of Nyborg, which was the link to the Great Belt, the strait between Funen and Zealand. They captured hundreds of Danish cavalry horses abandoned on the ice by the shoreline. The cavalrymen from three Danish squadrons had left their horses and continued on foot across the Great Belt, probably to Sprogø. Other Danish cavalrymen fled southeast across the ice to Langeland, and therefore, information circulated that the ice carried all the way to Lolland. The king immediately ordered extensive investigations into the bearing capacity of the ice at various locations on the Great Belt.

There is no doubt that he will do it, should it be feasible. Through his vigilance and celerity [swiftness of movement], he forestall and surprise his belated enemies, and never for a moment he neglects to exploit an advantage."

— Hugues Terlon, From Terlon's letter to cardinal Jules Mazarin dated 2 February 1658.

The Swedish troops were concentrated in Nyborg and Svendborg, the starting points for a continued march across to Zealand and Lolland, respectively. Outside Nyborg, Adjutant General Arensdorff and Lieutenant Colonel Georg Henrik Lybecker investigated the ice conditions to Korsør on the Zealand side. Erik Dahlbergh led the investigations along the Svendborg route through Langeland and across to Lolland. Through their superiors, Wrangel and Berendes, the king received continuous reports about the ice conditions. On 1 February, Wrangel reported a rumor to the king that the ice could carry them all the way out to Tåsinge between Funen and Langeland. The king was eager to cross the ice to Langeland, but he began to despair after receiving reports that the current between Langeland and Lolland obstructed ice formation. The frost had now taken hold of the Danish islands, and on 2 February, Lubecker reported that the ice between Nyborg and Sprogø was sufficiently strong, but on the other side of Sprogø, the ice was too thin to carry an entire army. On 3 February, Charles X Gustav moved from Dalum back to the mayor's manor in Odense. Since 1 February, the king had been waiting impatiently for a report from Berendes and Dahlbergh on the ice conditions across to Langeland.

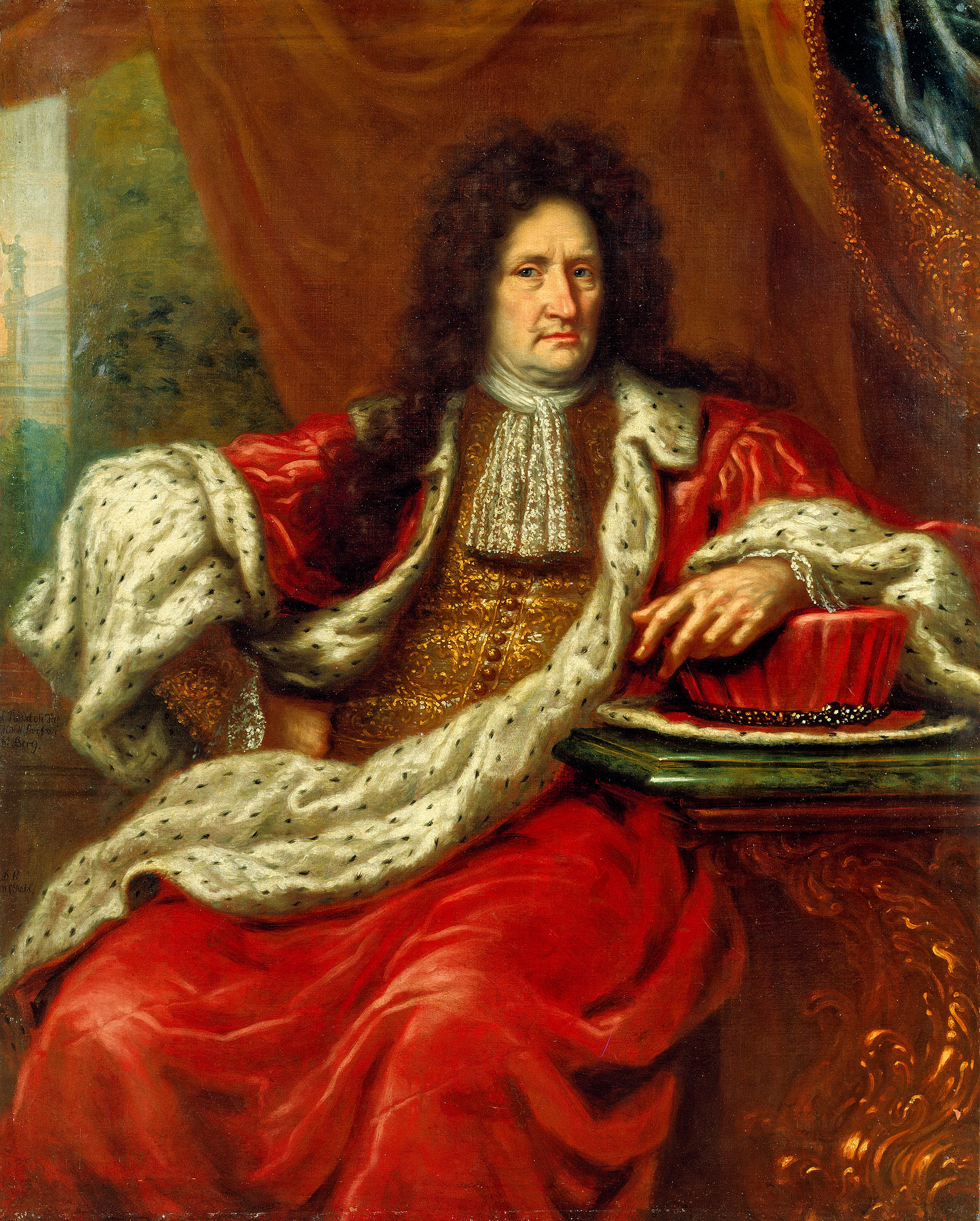
Erik Dahlbergh led the ice investigations along the Great Belt. He depicted these events in his diary and letters, where he greatly magnified his own efforts. Painting by David Klöcker Ehrenstrahl.

From the Danish side, Dahlbergh carried out careful investigations of the ice. On 2 February, Danish cavalrymen fleeing Funen arrived at the fortified town of Nakskov on Lolland, reporting they spotted a Swedish patrol on Langeland. The next day, Nakskov's commander received news that Swedish troops were inspecting the ice condition from Langeland to Lolland. Dahlbergh received his order from Charles X Gustav on 31 January, and escorted by 200 Finnish cavalrymen under Colonel Claes Uggla, Dahlbergh crossed two ice-covered straits and reached Longelse church on Langeland on 2 February, 80 kilometres (50 mi) from his starting point on Funen. There, Uggla regrouped with the main part of the cavalry, while Dahlbergh and 40 cavalrymen under Niethoff crossed the 13 kilometres (8.1 mi) wide Great Belt and arrived ashore at Grimstedt's mansion. The Danish coastguard of a dozen horsemen withdrew, but one of them was captured along with two farmers: Dahlbergh transported the prisoners across the Great Belt as living proof of their crossing. On the way back, Dahlbergh took several drill samples of the ice at Rudkøbing on Langeland and inspected a Swedish unit on Ærø. On the evening of 4 February, while the king received the proposal for a ceasefire from the English envoy, Dahlbergh returned to Odense and reported the ice conditions in Lolland were good. The king decided to go immediately to Nyborg to consult with Wrangel and Corfitz Ulfeldt.

The king arrived in Nyborg at 2:00 a.m. on 5 February. It was stated in the morning that the ice condition became more uncertain in this section. Several Swedish patrols testing the ice at Korsør fell through but managed to save themselves from drowning. Sudden changes in the weather obstructed the ice formation, including storms and thawing. The king contemplated withdrawing the bulk of his army to Jutland and leaving a couple of infantry regiments as an occupying force on Funen, concentrated around Odense. He considered starting negotiations with King Frederick III and appointed Ulfeldt and council member Sten Nilsson Bielke as his delegates to deliberate with their Danish counterpart, Steward of the Realm Joachim Gersdorff and council member Christen Skeel. He suggested the Swedish and Danish delegations should meet in Rudkøbing on 13 February, alternatively on Sprogø. Swedish patrols were dispatched to investigate the ice towards Falser, Langeland and Lolland. They reported the change of weather had not affected the ice conditions in the southern part of the Great Belt.

Towards the end of the afternoon on 5 February, Charles X Gustav finally decided that the army would march through Langeland towards Lolland. Accompanied by Ulfeldt, the king left Nyborg at the head of all available cavalry regiments. Wrangel was left with the infantry and remained in Nyborg. The king moved quickly to Svendborg, where earlier on eleven o'clock in the evening, a Swedish patrol of 60 men returned from Grimstedt on Lolland. The patrol looted the mansion and rode back in a closed formation at full trot and gallop, bringing a few Danish prisoners. Although the weather changed drastically, causing the snow to melt, the ice was found to be sufficiently strong all the way to Lolland. With this information, the king proceeded according to plan. He ordered Wrangel to re-examine the ice between Nyborg and Korsør. If the ice was still too thin in this section, Wrangel would immediately lead his troops south to Svendborg and cross the ice in the king's footsteps.

== March across the Great Belt ==
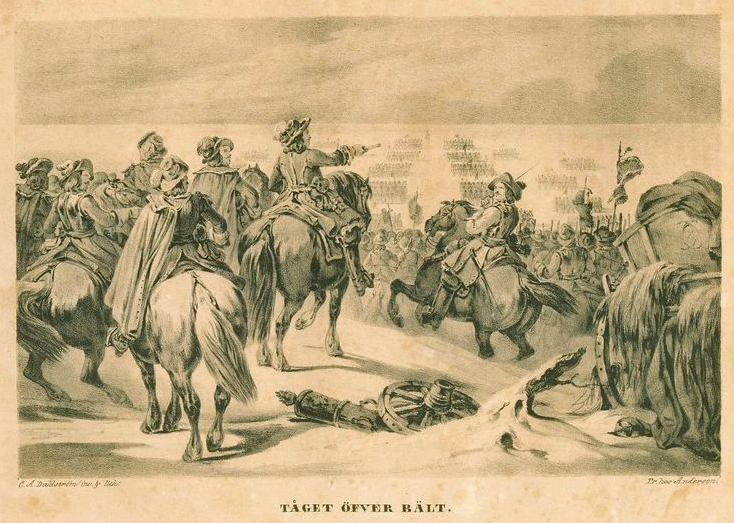
Tåget öfver Bält (1851) by Carl Andreas Dahlström.

The Swedish cavalry of between 2,000 and 3,000 men marched out on the ice outside of Svendborg, leading their horses by foot, on the night of 6 February. The Kalmar infantry regiment joined the march with 370 men. Charles X Gustav accompanied the rearguard out on the ice, ordering the Margrave of Baden-Durlach to cross the ice with the bulk of the cavalry to Tåsinge and continue to Rudkøbing. Reconnaissance patrols trotted in advance to confirm the ice conditions. Several squadrons, however, disappeared on forays against the Danish farms, forcing the king to dispatch his provosts to try to gather them. When the remaining troops went out on the ice, the snow on the ice melted in such a manner that 2 feet (61 cm) of water covered the ice surface. Although the water reached the top of the horses' legs in some places, the ice held. Only marginal losses occurred when miscellaneous units got lost during the night and disappeared through the ice.

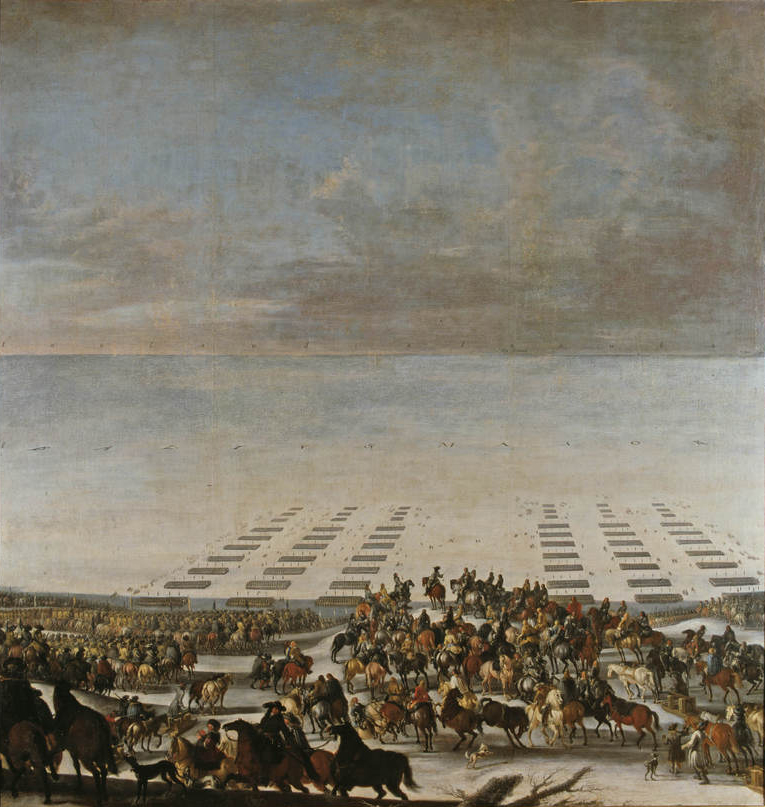
March across the Great Belt 1658. Painting by Johann Philip Lemke.

On the morning of 6 February, Charles X Gustav reached Rudkøbing on Langeland and quickly went across the island to the ferry at Longelse Church. At noon the same day, he reached Tyear's ferry on Lolland. In the evening, a Swedish cavalry regiment under Colonel Overbeck surrounded Nakskov. A Swedish trumpeter was sent to Nakskov and called on the Danish garrison of 150 men, including 75 men from Svend Poulsen's dragoon squadron, 1,500 conscripted peasants and 40 guns, to surrender. Although the commander, Colonel Franciscus Edmond, refused to surrender, the morale in the garrison waned and the local bourgeoisie took matters into their own hands. The burghers assaulted the conscripted peasants on the wall and disabled the cannons. On the night of 7 February, the bourgeoisie opened the city gates and sent a delegation handing over the keys of Nakskov to Ulfeldt as the king's representative. In the morning, a Swedish troop entered the city and captured the garrison. They disarmed the conscripted peasantry and ordered them home to their farms. Svante Banér was appointed commander and received 600 men to form a garrison. The same day, 600 Danish soldiers who were on their way to Nakskov to strengthen the Danish garrison stumbled upon a Swedish cavalry unit who captured them. Meanwhile, the king had passed Nakskov and advanced quickly with the bulk of his army to Oreby Farm, where he spent the night. On 8 February he marched across Sakskøbing and Guldborgsund to Falster.

Concluding he could not cross the ice from Nyborg, Wrangel marched to the king's starting point in Svendborg, bringing 3,000 men, of which 1,700 were infantry, 1,000 cavalry, and 200 artillerymen with 16 guns. On the morning of 7 February, Wrangel broke camp from Nyborg and, after a ten-hour rapid march, arrived at Tranekær Castle on Langeland. Wrangel crossed the Great Belt on a more northerly route than the king and arrived at Halsted Priory on Lolland on 8 February, where he struck camp for the night. On 9 February, Wrangel continued to Sakskøbing, where he received the king's permission to let his exhausted troops rest until 10 February. Wrangel's troops were reunited with Charles X Gustav's at Vålse on the afternoon of 11 February.

Following the forced and risky march across the ice, Charles X Gustav rested his troops for two days. The units were brought together, and in his camp at Vålse he commanded 5,000 cavalry, 2,500 infantry, and about 20 field guns. On 11 February the king broke camp with his reconnoiters and moved across Grønsund and the islands of Bogø and Farø to Zealand, capturing Vordingborg on the way. The king rode northward on Zealand with a vanguard of 600 horsemen and stumbled upon Ambassador Meadows and the Danish negotiators Gersdorf and Skeel. The king returned to Vordingborg and began the peace talks later that day, but he sought to continue his march to put further pressure on the Danes. On 12 February, the entire Swedish army broke camp at Vålse and marched to Præstø. The following day Swedish units moved into Køge, which the Danish troops had abandoned. They paused for a day to scout out their surroundings. On 15 February Swedish units passed Køge tavern and reached Torslunda Magle, only 22 kilometres (14 mi) from Copenhagen, while the Danish troops withdrew. Since 5 February, the garrison of Copenhagen consisted of 4,000 cavalry, 1,200 infantry and 2,000 sailors, including 3,000 armed citizens. Despite their numerical superiority, the morale in the capital waned, and on the evening of 15 February, Charles X Gustav received a message from Ambassador Meadows that Frederick III was ready to negotiate everything with no fixed conditions. Charles X Gustav ordered his army to halt and focused on the peace talks.

== Treaty of Roskilde ==
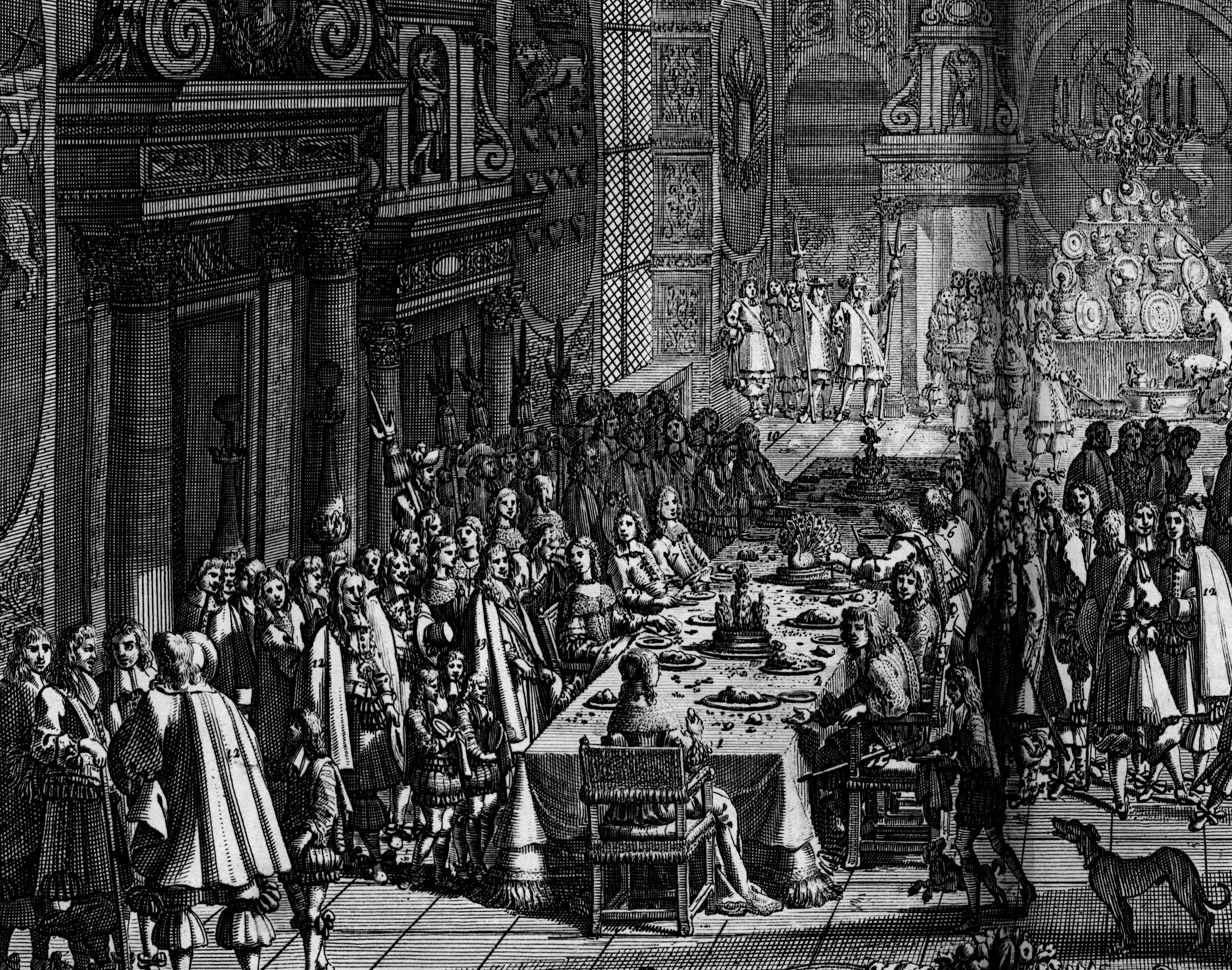
Celebration in Frederiksborg Castle to the Treaty of Roskilde. Painting (1658) by Erik Dahlbergh.

The final negotiations took place in Roskilde, and on 26 February, the final peace treaty was signed in Roskilde Cathedral. The Swedish military advantage was massive, and Swedish troops occupied almost all of Denmark. But at the same time, Charles X Gustav was in a hurry to make peace before other states intervened to aid Denmark. Therefore, the Swedish conditions were reduced step by step. The result was still a disaster for Denmark, which was forced to cede the provinces of Blekinge, Bornholm, Bohuslän, Scania and Trøndelag, and its claims to Halland under the Second Treaty of Brömsebro. Further conditions included heavy war reparations to the Swedish state, Danish renunciation of all anti-Swedish alliances, and Danish provision of troops and warships to serve Charles X Gustav in his broader wars.

A Swedish expeditionary force of 2,000 men under Clas Tott left Zealand and sailed to the Scanian coast on 1 March. The troops seized the Scanian fortresses, and the Danish garrisons were sent to the ports of Öresund to be transported back to Zealand. Drafted Scanian soldiers were disarmed and sent home to their farms. On 5 March, after staying in Frederiksborg Castle as Frederick III's personal guest, Charles X Gustav went to Helsingør and sailed across to Helsingborg in Frederick III's royal ship, where he was received by Archbishop Peder Winstrup and the Scanian clergy. On 9 March, Charles X Gustav entered Malmö, where he received an oath of allegiance from the Scanian nobles, priests, burghers, and peasants. Field Marshal Axel Lillie marched from Kalmar with 500 men into Blekinge on 13 March; by 15 March they had captured Kristianopel. On 18 March, Erik Stenbock and Major General Harald Stake entered Bohuslän from Västergötland and captured Bohus Fortress. At the end of April, Governor-General Johan Printzensköld landed on Bornholm with 100 men and four cannons, and on 10 May, the city of Trondheim was transferred to the governor of Falun, Lorentz Creutz and the future Swedish governor, Claes Stiernsköld.

== Second Dano-Swedish war ==
In the months following the Treaty of Roskilde, political tension grew on other fronts. Sweden was still at war with Poland-Lithuania, Russia, Austria and Brandenburg, and the king feared an allied attack aimed at tearing up the Roskilde treaty. He decided to prevent such an attack by declaring war on Denmark as early as 5 August 1658, with the aim of vanquishing Denmark as a sovereign state, dividing the country into four governments and seizing the revenues from the Sound Dues. Following the signing of the Roskilde treaty, Swedish troops still occupied the Danish islands, except Zealand. Charles X Gustav took advantage of the situation by landing in Korsør on 6 August 1658 with 5,200 men. Charles X Gustav began a siege of Copenhagen on 11 August, to starve the city's inhabitants into submission. In the meantime, Kronborg was captured on 6 September. The plan failed when the Netherlands joined the war to aid Denmark, and the united Danish and Dutch fleets defeated the Swedish fleet in the Battle of the Sound on 29 October. Following the victory, the Dutch could deliver supplies to Copenhagen's citizens. The Swedish siege continued, however, and culminated in the decisive assault on Copenhagen during the night between 10 and 11 February 1659, which ended in a Danish victory. An army of troops from Brandenburg, Poland and Austria attacked the Swedish troops in Jutland. The Swedes withdrew to Funen and, after the battle of Nyborg on 14 November 1659, they were forced to surrender. At the beginning of 1660, Charles X Gustav became seriously ill and died of pneumonia on 13 February in Gothenburg. This changed the political scene, and on 23 April 1660 Sweden signed the Treaty of Oliva with Poland-Lithuania, Austria and Brandenburg. By the Treaty of Copenhagen, signed on 27 May the same year, Bornholm and Trøndelag were returned to Denmark, while Sweden kept the provinces east of the Sound.

== Analysis ==
In his book 1658: tåget över bält (lit. '1658: March Across the Belt'), the Swedish historian Lars Ericson Wolke explained that several factors led to Charles X Gustav's victory in his first war with Denmark. On paper, the armies of Denmark and Sweden were relatively equal, though the Danish army and navy were slightly stronger. The Swedish army, however, was more combat-experienced, and its command was significantly more determined and ruthless. From a purely strategic and operational point of view, Charles X Gustav's decision to launch a campaign against Denmark was an unreasonable one, since he had not finished his ongoing campaign in Poland. But for the king and the Swedish command, Denmark was a higher priority than Poland, and the march towards Jutland gave Sweden an opportunity to withdraw from what they called the "Polish swamp" with their honor intact.

From the moment the Swedish army marched up to Jutland, they gained the initiative in the war: the Swedes acted, while the Danes reacted. The Swedes constantly made new and surprising maneuvers, never giving the Danish command time to plan and execute their own moves. The ice conditions in the Belts twice helped the Swedes out of difficult situations, which increased the pressure on Denmark even further. In addition, the Danish intelligence service suffered from serious shortcomings, even though the fighting took place in the heart of their own kingdom. The Danes repeatedly had a very vague view of the Swedish army, both in terms of its size and its exact location, which escalated uncertainty within the Danish command. Frederick III and his advisers constantly hoped that the Netherlands, and perhaps even Austria and Brandenburg, would come to their aid at the last minute. The constant Swedish pressure, paired with poor Danish intelligence, led to panic in the defense first of Funen, and later of Lolland and Zealand. The logical outcome was the "panic peace" treaty of Roskilde.

Before deciding to march across the Belts, Charles X Gustav and his army faced a potential catastrophe. The army was isolated and could face imminent encirclement should an Austrian-Polish army attack from the rear. If the ice on the Great Belt had not settled, the king's army might have been captured in the middle of the Danish kingdom without the opportunity to escape. The king's decision averted the impending catastrophe, thanks to a combination of luck and boldness. A similar analysis can be made of the ice marches themselves, during which two cavalry squadrons fell through the ice on the Little Belt and drowned. If the bulk of the army had perished, posterity would likely have condemned the decision to cross the ice. This did not occur, however, and a potential catastrophe turned into a huge military success, which in turn resulted in the most profitable peace treaty Sweden has ever signed. For Denmark, the peace treaty became a disaster that severely mutilated the kingdom.

== Aftermath ==
The march across the Belts, including the resulting Roskilde Treaty, has long been viewed as a success story in the history of Sweden and an admirable achievement, since Charles X Gustav and the Swedish army carried out the campaign with relatively few losses. During the age of romantic nationalism in the 19th century and the beginning of the 20th century, Charles X Gustav was highlighted as the king who gave Sweden its current and "natural" borders. The campaign has triggered a prolonged discussion among historians, partly over the issue of whether Charles X Gustav's war policy was to the benefit or detriment of Sweden as a whole, and partly over Erik Dahlbergh's role in the decision-making process regarding the Swedish army's march across the ice. The decision itself, however, has rarely been discussed or questioned, despite its crucial importance for the future of both the Swedish empire and its army.

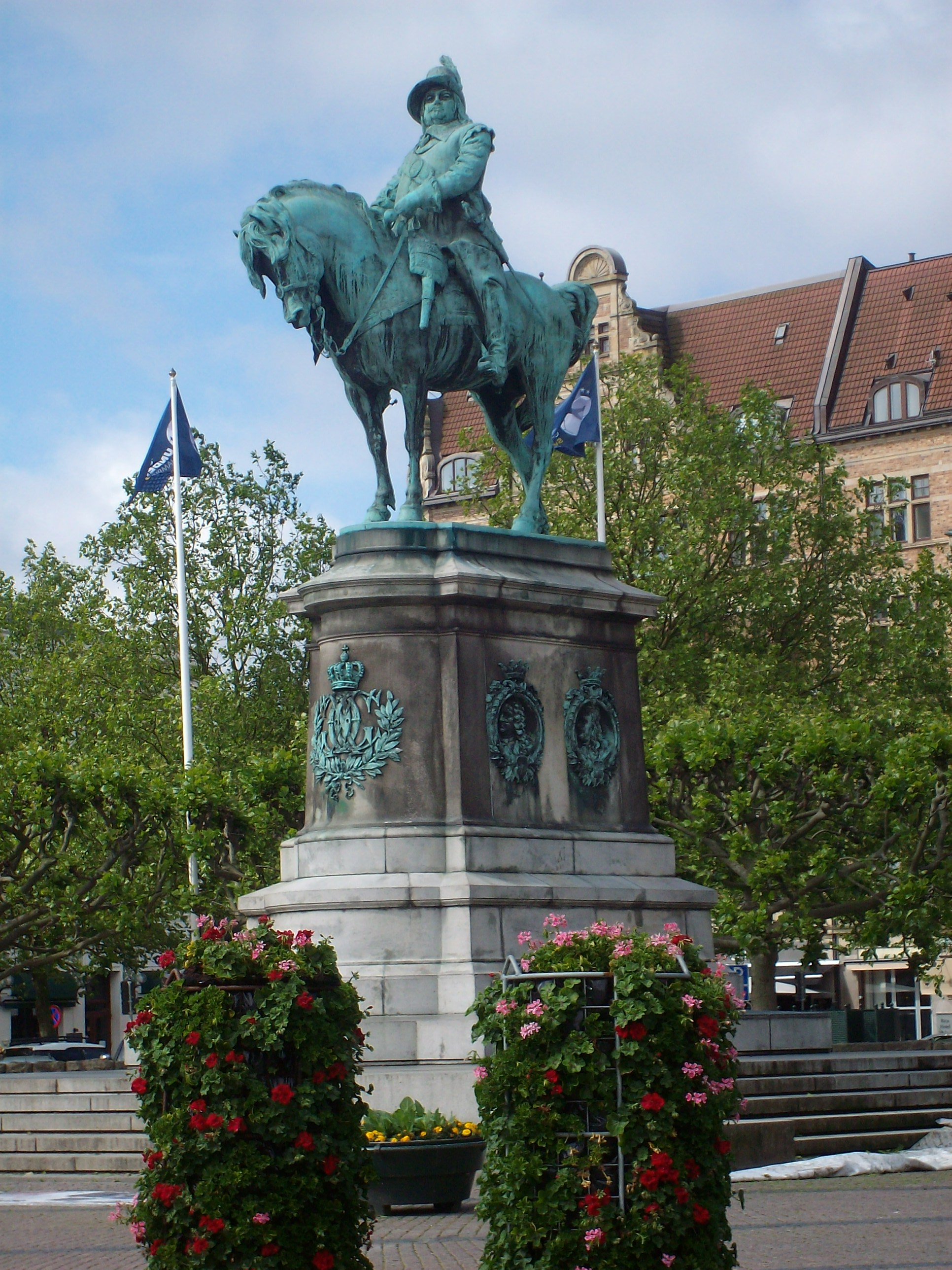
Equestrian statue by John Börjeson of Charles X Gustav on Stortorget ("Main Square") in Malmö.

The first historian to portray the campaign and Charles X Gustav's actions was the historical writer Samuel von Pufendorf in his work De rebus a Carolo Gustavo gestis (lit. 'The feats of Charles X Gustav'), commissioned by Charles X Gustav, and completed for publication in 1696. Pufendorf used various sources to describe the course of events, including reports from Hugu Terlon and Philip Meadow and notes written by Swedish secretary Edvard Ehrenstéen. According to these, it was Charles X Gustav who was the driving force and who made the final decisions in the campaign, sometimes contrary to the warnings of his advisers. According to Pufendorf, Charles X Gustav was the lone hero, and the Treaty of Roskilde was his achievement only. The depiction of the circumstances of the decision-making process both in Frederiksodde and on Funen became complicated as Erik Dahlbergh's autobiography and excerpts from his diary were published in 1757 and 1785, respectively. In both works, Dahlbergh highlighted his own role in the king's decision to cross the Great Belt: it was his ice investigations, including the fact that he presented the report on the ice conditions to the king, that spurred the king's decision process. In the resulting deliberations in Nyborg, it was Dahlbergh who persuaded the king to venture out on the ice, while Wrangel and Corfitz Ulfeldt advised otherwise. In 1786, Carl Gustaf Nordin wrote a biography of Erik Dahlbergh, stating that "in Dahlbergh's words, the march across the Belts took place; and without it, Sweden would have been a few provinces smaller, and the world would have one less heroic act to admire".

In his book series Berättelser ur Svenska historien (lit. 'Stories from Swedish history'), Anders Fryxell criticized the heroic image of Charles X Gustav, viewing the king's war policy as morally unjust. Wilhelm Erik Svedelius rebuked Fryxell in 1844. Swedelius believed one could not place moral values on the actions of statesmen, arguing the good of the state was synonymous with the morally good. Fryxell gave his response in 1855, comparing Charles X Gustav's attack on Denmark in 1658 with Russia's attack on Sweden in 1808, which led to the loss of Finland.

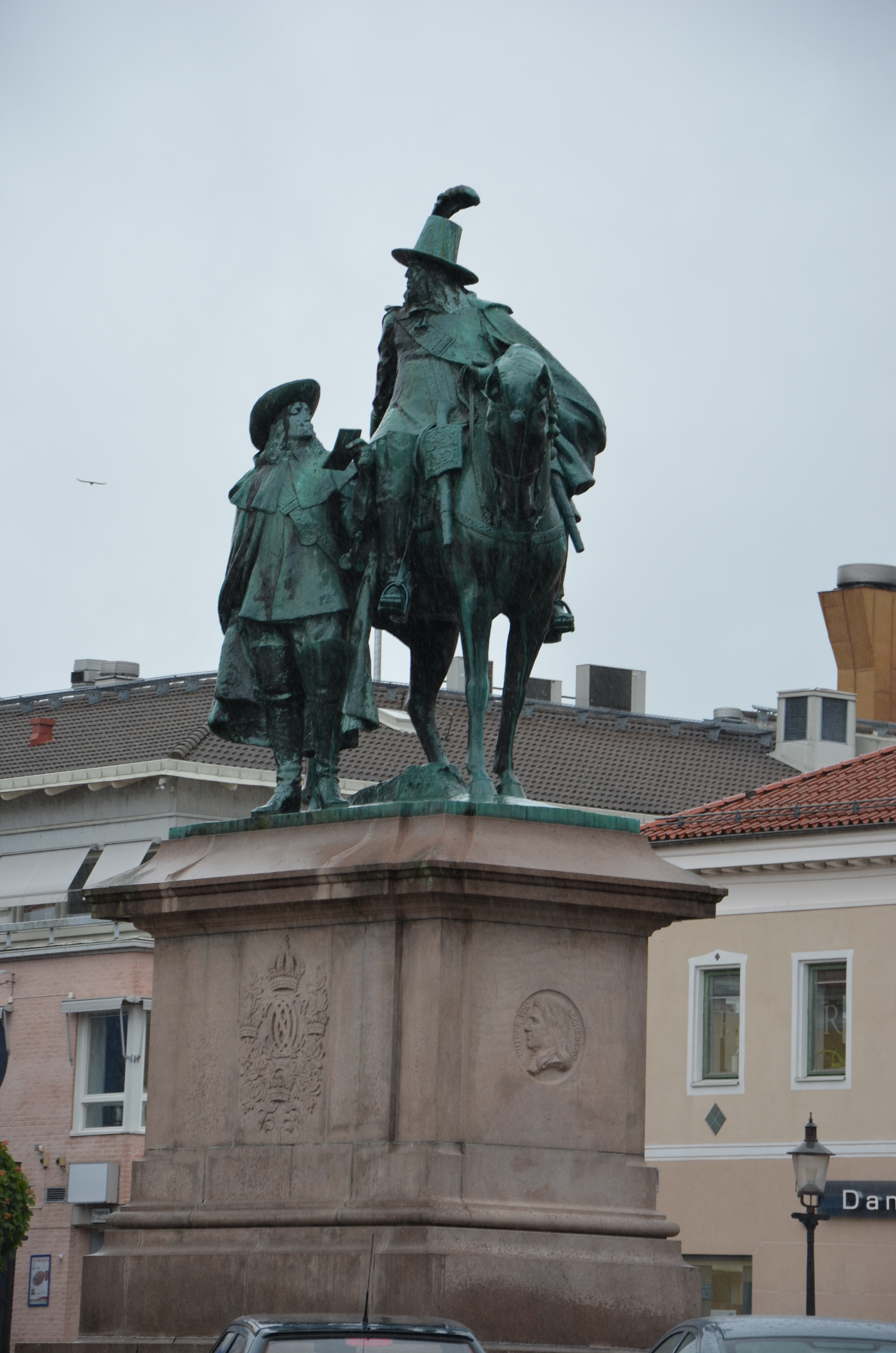
Equestrian statue by Theodor Lundberg on Kungstorget ("King's Square") in Uddevalla depicting Charles X Gustav with Erik Dahlbergh by his side.

Erik Gustaf Geijer stated Erik Dahlbergh was "the foremost instigator" behind the king's decision to cross the Belts. Following Geijer, several Danish and Swedish historians made the same assessment of Dahlbergh's role, including Ernst Ericsson, but some, as emphasized by Curt Weibull, highlighted Ulfeldt's role in the campaign. Julius Albert Fridericia and Fredrik Ferdinand Carlson mainly expressed this approach. Writing in 1855, Carlson emphasized how Wrangel and Ulfeldt argued against a march across the ice and almost convinced Charles X Gustav to call off his campaign until Dahlbergh, in a single deliberation, persuaded the king to change his mind. Carlson regarded Charles X Gustav as the man who gave Sweden its natural borders, and as an early proponent of Scandinavism whose war policy strove for the unity of and prosperity for the entire Nordic region. Though he rejected calling Charles X Gustav a proponent of a united Scandinavia, Fridericia was of the same opinion as Carlson that "it was Erik Dahlbergh whose counsel came to decide the fate of the Nordic nations".

Gustaf Björlin critically examined the decision-making process behind the march across the Belts in 1921. He highlighted the source-critical weaknesses in Dahlbergh's diary and memoirs, which were released long after the course of the depicted events. Dahlbergh had an apparent need to promote his own career and emphasize his exploits in the service of the late king. Later in Dahlbergh's life, he became one of Sweden's most powerful civil servants and military commanders, which, according to Björlin, stimulated his need to polish his early career. Björlin stated that Dahlberg "created his story without any witnesses", since it was not possible to prove the validity of Dahlbergh's reports based on other sources. Later researchers and in subsequent depictions of the campaign, Björlin's examination of Dahlbergh's writings was ignored. It was not until 1948 that Curt Weibull acknowledged Björlin's argument. During his lecture before a Nordic history seminar in Lillehammer, Weibull rejected Dahlbergh's writings, labeling them stories with no factual historical value. Weibull emphasized it was Ulfeldt who played an important role in the king's decision to cross the Belt. Several researchers opposed Weibull, and the debate continued when he returned to the subject in an essay in 1954. Hans Villius, who critically examined Dahlbergh's depiction of the Danish wars in his reports, supported Weibull. In his 1958 book När Skåne blev svenskt (lit. 'When Scania became Swedish'), Alf Åberg considered Dahlbergh's stories very unreliable as sources and that he had probably exaggerated his own role in the campaign.

He (Dahlbergh) was quartermaster general of the army, and as such, was commissioned to reconnoiter the quarters and the roads. But this time he dawdled away, and the king was forced to dispatch other reconnoiters. Their testimonies weighed as heavily as Dahlbergh's. He was not present during the march itself, so the road across the islands to Zealand must have been guided by others. Dahlbergh's information that Wrangel and Ulfeldt advised against the march has also been proven incorrect. Wrangel was zealously engaged in ascertaining the sustainability of the ice on his section, and Ulfedt stood by the king's side when he made his final decision. There is no doubt that it was the king, not Dahlbergh, who took the initiative and took full responsibility for the venture."

— Alf Åberg.

Weibull's and Björlin's views of the events have had a strong impression on other researchers since the 1950s, when the so-called "Weibull School" in the 1940s and 1950s dominated Swedish historiography. Arne Stade, however, was unconvinced by Weibull; in 1957, Stade opined that in Dahlbergh's presentations one could still find "the real and psychic reality" that hides behind the dramatized depiction of how the decision on the ice march was made. Stade's view was expressed in a large research project on Charles X Gustav, conducted by the historical department of the Swedish Armed Forces Staff College between 1965 and 1979. In addition, some researchers continued to see value in Dahlbergh's writings as sources, despite their weaknesses. In the book Den oövervinnerlige (lit. 'The Invincible') from 2000 by Peter Englund, he portrays Dahlbergh as having an influence on the decision-making process that took place on Funen. In the popular science genre, the march was depicted in Carl Grimberg's book Svenska folkets underbara öden (lit. 'The Wonderful Fates of the Swedish people'), which in the 1910s, and for many years later, dominated many Swedes' view of history. Grimberg praises Charles X Gustav for his bold actions. Grimberg's and Hugo Uddgren's book Svenska krigarbragder (lit. 'Feats of Swedish warriors'), depicts the campaign in the chapter titled "En bragd utan like i världshistorien" (lit. 'A feat without equal in world history'). They emphasize Carlson's view that the Roskilde treaty "along with the Brömsebro treaty, was the most valuable peace treaty our country has ever fought for, because both of them together gave Sweden, still to this day, its preserved natural borders".

=== Memorials and cultural references ===
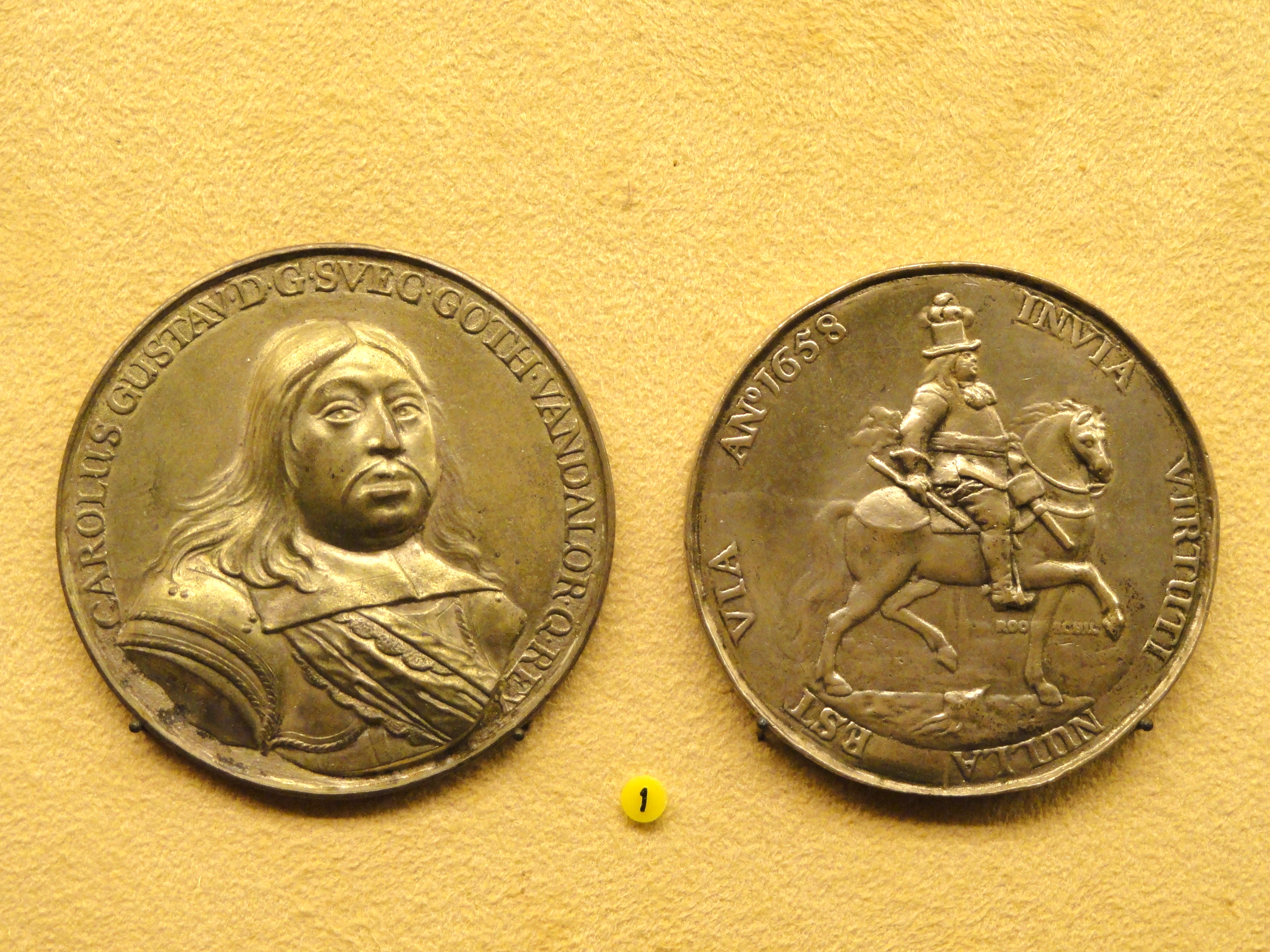
Medal struck by Pieter van Abeele commemorating the campaign.

After the campaign had ended, poet Georg Stiernhielm depicted both the war and the campaign in his work Discursus Astropoeticus (lit. 'The Astropoeticus Argument') which, however, was not a traditional heroic tribute to the campaign. It was not until the 18th century when Swedish lyricists attempted to create a classic epic poem. Hedvig Charlotta Nordenflycht wrote the poem Tåget öfver Bält (lit. 'The march across the Belt') in 1754, in which she depicted the events of Charles X Gustav's reign as a result of a play by supernatural forces. She entered her poem in the Royal Academy of Letters' first prize competition, though she did not win an award. The academy's secretary Olof von Dalin was accused of deliberately withholding the poem from Queen Lovisa Ulrika and the members of the academy. In 1785, Gustaf Fredrik Gyllenborg published the poem Tåget öfver Bält. Neither Nordenflycht's nor Gyllenborg's work was successful with the public. Arnold Munthe wrote the play Tåget öfver Bält, which was staged on 12 February 1920 at the Royal Dramatic Theatre with Tor Hedberg as director.

Concurrently with the Nordic industrial and handicraft exhibition in Malmö in 1896, an equestrian statue depicting Charles X Gustav was erected on Stortorget ("Main Square") in the city. John Börjeson created the statue, and the driving force behind its construction was politician Carl Herslow, along with historian Martin Weibull, who gave the ceremonial speech on 28 June 1896. Weibull highlighted Charles X Gustav's long-term attempt to unite the Nordic peoples as early as the 1650s. In 1908, the 250th anniversary of the Roskilde Treaty was celebrated in Malmö. In 1915, Theodor Lundberg's statue depicting Charles X Gustav accompanied by Erik Dahlbergh was inaugurated on Kungstorget ("King's Square") in Uddevalla. A statue of the king created by Gustaf Malmquist was also planned in Stockholm, and after a lengthy process mainly due to the dissolution of the Swedish-Norwegian union, an equestrian statue was inaugurated in front of the Nordic Museum on 6 June 1917. Malmquist's statue received aesthetic criticism from August Brunius in Svenska Dagbladet ("The Swedish Daily News"), with novelist Hjalmar Söderberg suggesting the statue should have been melted down into emergency coins. Recently, Börjeson's statue in Malmö has been a subject of discussion among the city's residents and municipal politicians.

The campaign has been depicted both in paintings and in chalcography. War artist Johann Philip Lemke and Carl Andreas Dahlström portrayed Charles X Gustav and his army on the ice in dense, square formations, when in reality, they were spread several meters apart and led their horses on foot. Lemke made these paintings using Erik Dahlbergh's drawings or engravings and under his supervision. Lemke's paintings are displayed in the gallery of Charles X Gustav in Drottningholm Palace. Gustaf Cederström made a painting unveiled in 1912 in the stairwell of the House of Nobility, depicting Charles X Gustav on horseback with Dahlbergh showing the way across the ice-covered Great Belt on foot. After the Treaty of Roskilde, Charles X Gustav struck a medal, created by Johan Georg Breuer, with the inscription in Latin: "Natura hoc debuit uni" ("This aid nature was obliged to give to a single man"). Other medals commemorating the campaign have been struck by Pieter van Abeele and Arvid Karlsteen.

The street Bältgatan (The Belt Street) in the Stockholm district Östermalm is named after the campaign; similarly named streets also exist in Gothenburg, Kungsör, and Råå.

== Works cited ==
- Asker, Björn (2010), Karl X Gustav: en biografi [Charles X Gustav: a biography] (in Swedish), Lund: Historiska media, ISBN 978-91-86297-09-1
- Englund, Peter (2000), Den oövervinnerlige [The Invincible] (in Swedish), Stockholm: Atlantis, ISBN 91-7486-999-X
- Gullberg, Tom (2008), Lejonet vaknar 1611–1660 [The lion wakes up 1611–1660] (in Swedish), Helsinki: Schildts, ISBN 978-951-50-1822-9
- Hillingsø, Kjeld (2018), Broderstrid: Danmark mod Sverige 1657-60 [Battle between brothers: Denmark against Sweden 1657-60] (in Danish), Köpenhamn: Gyldendal, ISBN 978-87-02-08800-7
- Isacson, Claes-Göran (2002), Karl X Gustavs krig [The wars of Charles X Gustav] (in Swedish), Lund: Historiska media, ISBN 91-89442-57-1
- Rosander, Lars (2003), Sveriges fältmarskalkar: svenska fältherrar från Vasa till Bernadotte [Sweden's field marshals: Swedish commanders from Vasa to Bernadotte] (in Swedish), Lund: Historiska media, ISBN 91-89442-05-9
- Sundberg, Ulf (2010), Sveriges krig 1630–1814 [Swedish wars 1630–1814] (in Swedish), Hallstavik: Svenskt Militärhistoriskt Bibliotek, ISBN 978-91-85789-63-4
- Weibull, Curt (1949), "Tåget över bält" [March Across the Belts], Scandia: Tidskrift för Historisk Forskning (in Swedish), 19 (1), ISSN 0036-5483, archived from the original on 6 February 2015
- Wolke, Lars Ericson (2008), 1658: tåget över Bält [1658: March Across the Belts] (in Swedish), Lund: Historiska media, ISBN 978-91-85873-03-6
- Åberg, Alf (2013), När Skåne blev svenskt: två krig, två freder, snapphanar och försvenskning [When Scania became Swedish: two wars, two peace treaties, snapphanes and Swedification] (in Swedish), Stockholm: Svenskt militärhistoriskt bibliotek, ISBN 978-91-86837-43-3
