= Alice Eklund =

Swedish actor

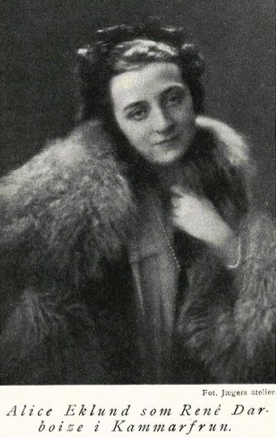
- Born: Alice Jenny Uddgren; 21 July 1896; Stockholm, Sweden
- Died: 6 October 1983 (aged 87); Bromma, Sweden
- Occupation: Actress
- Years active: 1915-1972
- Spouse: Ernst Eklund (m. 1919–1971)

Alice Eklund (21 July 1896 – 6 October 1983) was a Swedish stage and TV actress. She also directed one film in 1936.

She was the daughter of actress Anna Hofman-Uddgren (1868–1947) and was married to actor Ernst Eklund (1882–1971). Together with her husband she managed and performed at several theaters, among others: Blancheteatern and Comediteatern.

== Selected filmography ==
- The Girls of Uppakra (1936)
- Fånga en fallande stjärna (1963)
- Patrasket (1966)
- Mästerdetektiven Blomkvist på nya äventyr (1966)
- Barnen i Höjden (1973)
