= Children of Divorce =

Children of Divorce can refer to:

- Children of Divorce (1927 film), a 1927 American film directed by Frank Lloyd
- Children of Divorce (1939 film), a 1939 Danish film directed by Benjamin Christensen
- Children of Divorce (1980 film), a 1980 American television film featuring Lance Kerwin
