= Ernst Eklund (actor) =

Swedish actor and theatre director (1882–1971)

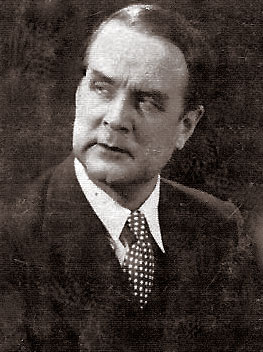
- Eklund in 1935
- Born: Ernst Olof Eklund; 6 August 1882; Östervåla, Sweden
- Died: 3 August 1971 (aged 88); Stockholm, Sweden
- Occupations: Actor; theatre director
- Years active: 1914–1962
- Spouse: Alice Eklund (m. 1919)
- Children: Nils Eklund
- Relatives: Anna Hofman-Uddgren (mother-in-law)

Ernst Olof Eklund (6 August 1882 – 3 August 1971) was a Swedish film actor and theatre director. He appeared in 40 films between 1914 and 1962 and was also the director of six different theatres.

== Biography ==
Eklund was born at Östervåla in Uppsala County, Sweden. He began playing amateur theater in Gävle. During his career he was director of several theaters: Blancheteatern 1917–1926, Comediteatern 1923–1938, Konserthusteatern 1926–1927, Skansenteatern 1934–1940, Oscarsteatern 1938–1941 and Lisebergsteatern in Gothenburg 1947–1956.

He was married to actress and theatre director Alice Eklund (1896–1983), daughter of actress Anna Hofman-Uddgren (1868–1947) and screenwriter Karl Gustaf Uddgren (1865–1927). He was the father of actor Nils Eklund (born 1927).

== Partial filmography ==
- The Strike (1914)
- Fru Kristina (1917) - Franz Herder
- Søster Karin (1917) - Martin Falk
- Moderens Øjne (1917) - Carl Lind - Povl's Father / Povl as Adult
- Jefthas dotter (1919) - Runo Procope
- Ödets redskap (1922) - Augustus Ferrer
- A Stolen Waltz (1932) - Allan Dehner
- En natt på Smygeholm (1933) - Major Hector
- En stilla flirt (1934) - Gunnar Green
- The Song to Her (1934) - Harry Händel
- Under False Flag (1935) - Karl Hammar
- Poor Millionaires (1936) - Georg Delmar
- Johan Ulfstjerna (1936) - Prof. Stenback
- The Lady Becomes a Maid (1936) - Karl-Axel Allard
- Milly, Maria och jag (1938) - Prof. Klintberg
- Variety Is the Spice of Life (1939) - Uncle Ludvig
- Bright Prospects (1941) - Helge Dahlberg
- Fröken Kyrkråtta (1941) - Col. Lindberg
- Hemtrevnad i kasern (1941) - Col. Justus Tamm
- Dangerous Ways (1942) - Katena
- Tomorrow's Melody (1942) - Wassberg
- We House Slaves (1942) - Teodor Larsson
- Jacobs stege (1942) - Olsson
- It Is My Music (1942) - Georg Welander
- Flickan är ett fynd (1943) - Pontus Axelsson
- Young Blood (1943) - Major Björn Lindemark
- Älskling, jag ger mig (1943) - Thomas Berg
- Live Dangerously (1944) - Professor Fors
- The Green Lift (1944) - Direktör Bang
- Maria of Kvarngarden (1945) - Major Lundgren
- Jagad (1945) - Ella's Father
- Brita in the Merchant's House (1946) - Grosshandlaren
- Crisis (1946) - Uncle Edvard
- Banketten (1948) - Jacob
- Vagabond Blacksmiths (1949) - Kilbom
- Café Lunchrasten (1954) - Editor-in-chief (uncredited)
- Seger i mörker (1954) - Bank Manager
- Så tuktas kärleken (1955) - The Doctor
