= Anna Hofman-Uddgren =

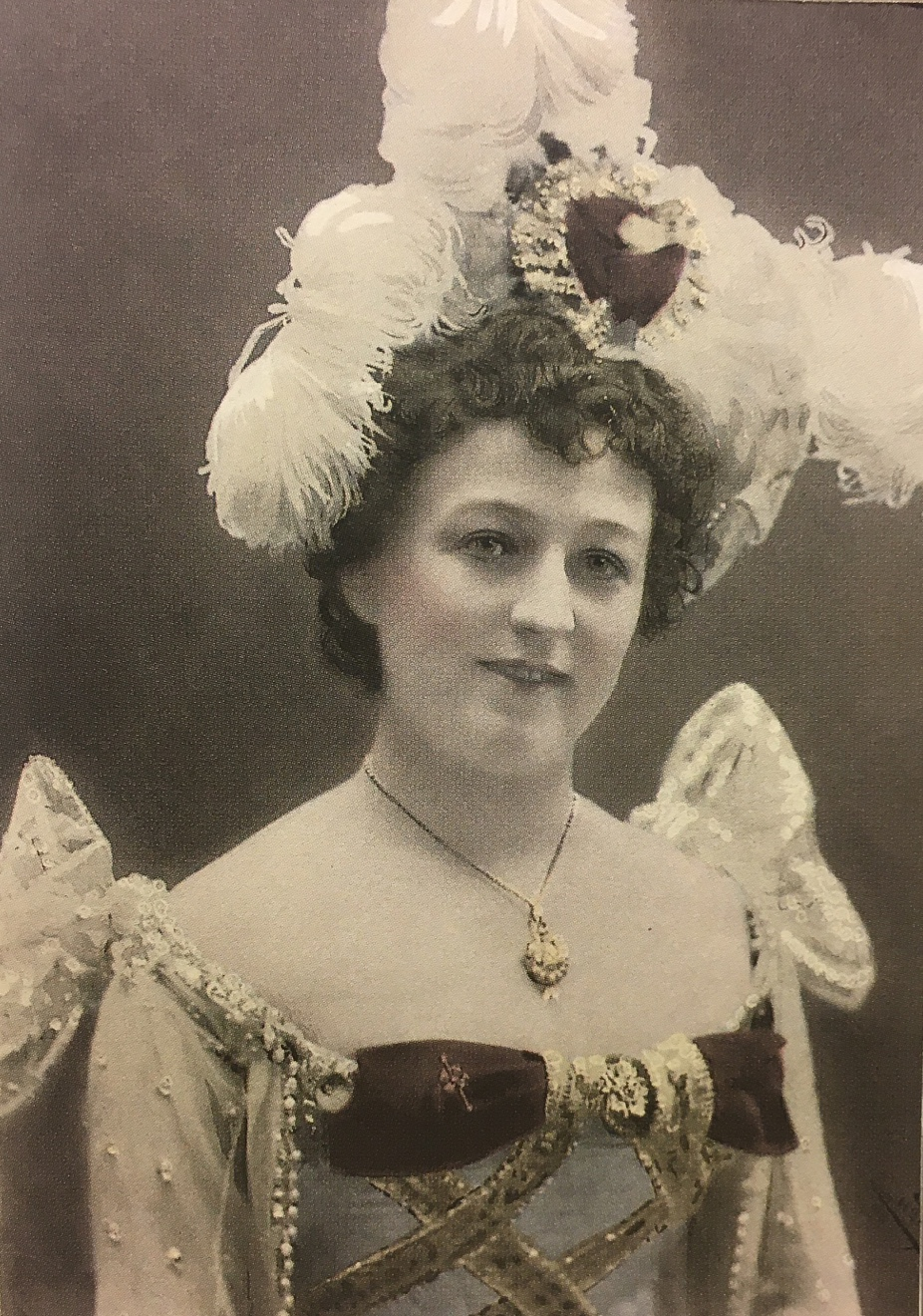
Anna Hofman-Uddgren, ca. 1890

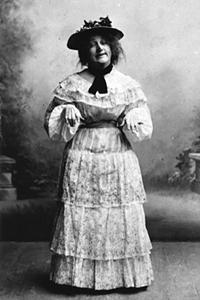
Anna Hofman-Uddgren as Fia Jansson in Emil Norlander's 1900 stage variety Den förgyllda lergöken ("The Gilded Ocarina")

Anna Maria Viktoria Hofman-Uddgren (23 February 1868 – 1 June 1947) née Hammarström; also known as Hoffman and Hofmann, was a Swedish actress, cabaret singer, music hall and revue artist, theatre director, and film director. Until 2016, she was referred to as the first woman to become a film director in Sweden.

== Life ==
Anna Hofman-Uddgren was born in Hedvig Eleonora parish on Östermalm in Stockholm, Sweden.

She was the daughter of Emma Hammarström (1849–1910). Her mother Emma Hammarström was from the peasantry and had moved to the capital as young. She was officially listed in the register as a widow, but in reality she had never been married, and the man she registered as her former husband never existed. During the childhood of Anna Hofman-Uddgren, her mother managed a tobacco store, and was given an irregular allowance from the king.

Anna Hofman-Uddgren was alleged to have been the illegitimate daughter of King Oscar II of Sweden. This was an often-repeated rumor in Stockholm at the time. The French artist Cléo de Mérode, who was engaged as a guest artist by Hofman-Uddgren, referred to these rumors: "It was said of her that she was the natural daughter of King Oscar, which is possible, as she had a noted confidence." This rumor was never confirmed, however: Anna Hofman-Uddgren banned the press from mentioning any biographical information about her, an instruction that was respected by the press, despite the fact that biographical information was otherwise customarily provided about artists in the press.

=== Education and career ===
Hofman-Uddgren attended a fashionable girls' school until it was discovered that she was illegitimate. In her unpublished memoirs, Hofman-Uddgren stated that when she was seventeen, she was taken to Stockholm Palace by her mother, where she was introduced in private to the king, and that he asked her if there was anything he could do for her. In 1887, Oscar II financed a trip to Paris, where she remained for eight years, studying the French language and singing. She came to know the Swedish singer Augusta Öhrström, who introduced her in Paris' artist circles. She debuted as a singer in charity concerts in Paris in 1888, and became a success. Oscar II did not approve of her choice of career, and retracted his allowance, and she was engaged as a singer in an operetta company, touring France and Italy.

In 1892, Hofman-Uddgren returned to Stockholm, where she debuted as a chanteuse at Stockholms Tivoli, an amusement park on the island of Djurgården in Stockholm, where she became a popular artist with her French repertoire of songs. At the end of the nineteenth century, Anna Hofman-Uddgren assumed management of the popular open-air music hall theater Kristallsalongen in Djurgården. She managed the theater business until 1924. She continued to work as an actor and singer in parallel to being a manager.

She also served as a director in her theater. In 1897, film was launched in Sweden, and Hofman-Uddgren was among the very first to use this new art form in her establishment: movie strips were shown regularly in her theater from the 1890s onward. She debuted as a film director as well as a film actress in the silent film Stockholmsfrestelser (1911). She also directed the films of two plays by August Strindberg, Fadren (1912) and Fröken Julie (1912).

== Personal life ==
She married screenwriter, poet, journalist, and author Karl Gustaf Uddgren (1865–1927) in 1900 and they had six children: five daughters and one son. Her daughter, actress and theatre director Alice Eklund (1896–1983), married actor Ernst Eklund (1882–1971). Anna Hofmann-Uddgren died in Bromma and was buried at Skogskyrkogården in Stockholm. Her grandchildren included actress Öllegård Wellton (1932–1991).

== See also ==
- Ebba Lindkvist – later identified as the first woman to become a film director in Sweden
