= The Girls of Uppakra =

1936 film

- Directed by: Lorens Marmstedt; Alice Eklund
- Written by: Torsten Quensel
- Based on: The Girls of Uppakra by Maja Jäderin-Hagfors
- Starring: Stina Hedberg; Isa Quensel; Vera Valdor
- Cinematography: Olle Ekman
- Music by: Sune Waldimir
- Production company: Nordisk Filmproduktion
- Distributed by: Film AB Paramount
- Release date: 26 December 1936
- Running time: 78 minutes
- Country: Sweden
- Language: Swedish

The Girls of Uppakra (Swedish: Flickorna på Uppåkra) is a 1936 Swedish drama film directed by Alice Eklund and Lorens Marmstedt and starring Stina Hedberg, Isa Quensel and Vera Valdor. The film is based on the 1927 novel of the same name by the author Maja Jäderin-Hagfors. It was shot at the Sundbyberg Studios in Stockholm. The film's sets were designed by the art director Max Linder.

== Synopsis ==
The widow Marie Brummell lives in Stockholm with her four daughters, but is terrible at managing money. She manages to scrape together enough money to acquire a farm in Uppakra in Scania.

== Cast ==
- Stina Hedberg as Marie Brummell
- Isa Quensel as Elsa Brummell
- Vera Valdor as Brita Brummell
- Marie-Louise Sorbon as Ann-Marie Brummell
- Ulla Sorbon as Svea Brummell
- Inga Jansson as Ingrid Brummell
- Lauritz Falk as Gunnar Broman
- Dagmar Ebbesen as Kristina Broman
- Semmy Friedmann as Eric Dahlberg
- Gösta Cederlund as Steen
- Carl Deurell as Tradesman Eriksson
- Anna-Lisa Fröberg as Secretary
- Mona Geijer-Falkner as Market Customer
- Nils Hallberg as Rowdy Boy
- Arne Lindblad as Waiter
- Olav Riégo as Bank Manager
- Stina Sorbon as Office Clerk
- Gösta Terserus as Constable Lagström

== Bibliography ==
- Qvist, Per Olov & von Bagh, Peter. Guide to the Cinema of Sweden and Finland. Greenwood Publishing Group, 2000.
