= Alba Schwartz =

Danish writer

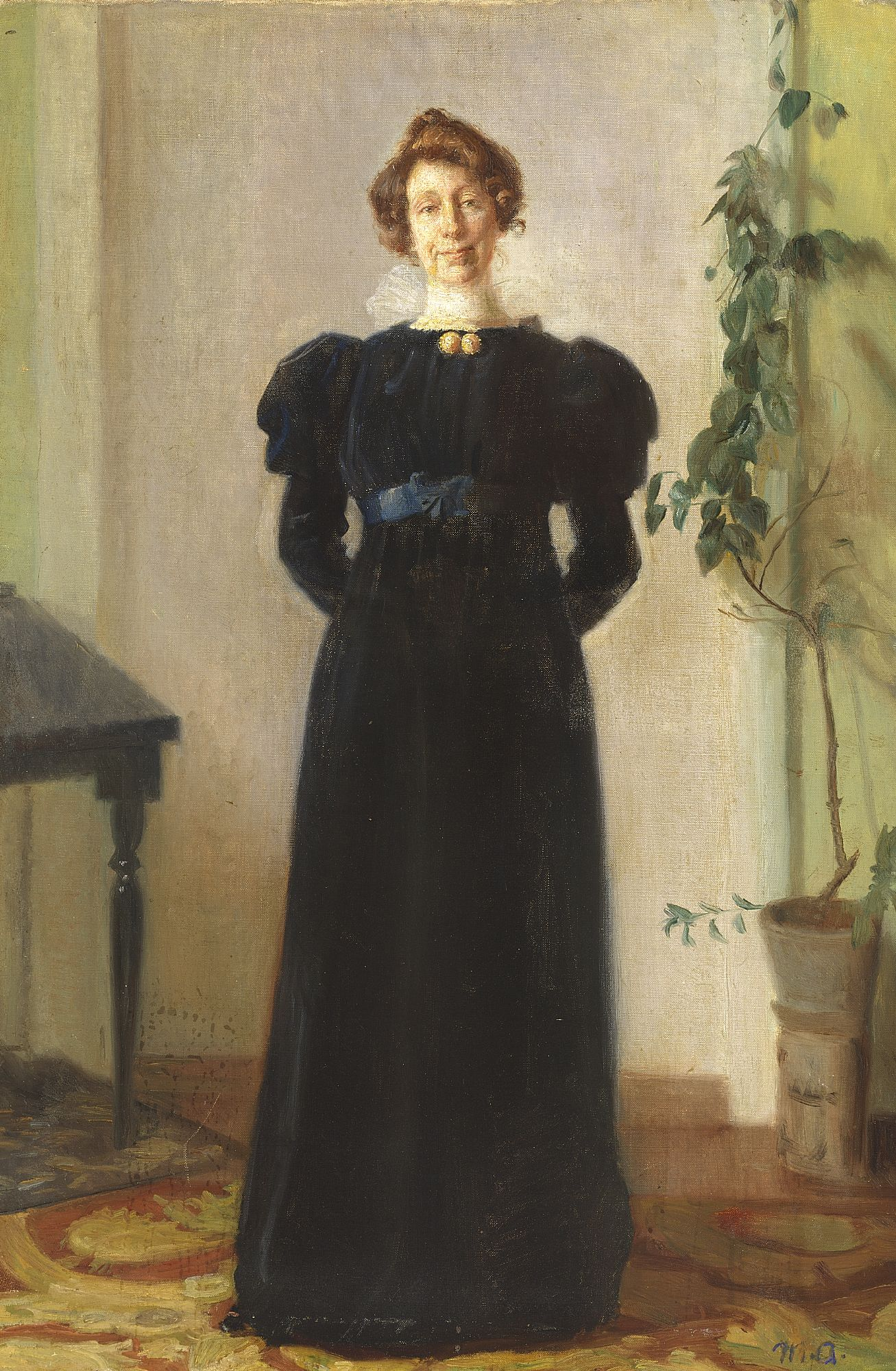
Portrait of Alba Schwartz by Michael Ancher (c.1900)

Sofie Albertine (Alba) Schwartz née Larsen (1857–1942) was a Danish writer who contributed to the social life of Skagen in the north of Jutland after her husband was appointed mayor in 1899. Her earlier writings documented the history of the town but it was not until she was in her seventies that she began writing novels, publishing Overlægen (The Specialist Physician) in 1935. Her most successful work was Skilsmissens Børn which led to the film Children of Divorce in 1939.

== Early life, education and family ==
Born on 9 December 1857 in Copenhagen, Sofie Albertine Larsen was the daughter of the surgeon Søren Eskildsen Larsen (1802–90) and his wife Sophia Albertina née Matzen (1815–95). She was the youngest of the family's 14 children. Brought up in a well-to-do home in central Copenhagen, she initially aspired to become an actress and studied drama under the celebrated Ludvig Phister. In December 1882, she married the municipal lawyer Otto Georg Schwartz (1852–1915) with whom she had two children: Erik (1884) and Walther (1889).

== Professional life ==
Schwartz briefly performed on the stage in Holberg's Jeppe on the Hill but following her marriage in 1882, she devoted herself to her family. In 1899, with her husband's appointment as mayor, the family moved to Skagen where they became an active part of the cultural scene centred on the Skagen Painters, associating in particular with Anna and Michael Ancher who instructed their son Walther in painting. Taking an interest in the history of the town and its current development, she published a two-volume illustrated work consisting of Skagen. Den svundne Tid i Sagn og Billeder (1912) and Skagen. Den nye Tid i Oplevelser og Indtryk (1913).

It was not however until she was in her seventies that she began to write novels, all based on love, affectionate relationships and family life, especially the role of motherhood. First came Overlægen (The Specialist Physician, 1932) describing a love affair between a nurse and her superior, then came Barnet (The Child, 1935) which is also set in the medical environment she know from childhood. Her most successful work was Skilsmissens Børn (1936) which led to the film Children of Divorce in 1939.

Alba Schwartz died in Skagen on 10 January 1942.
