= Stina Hedberg =

Swedish actress

- Hedberg c.1910
- Born: 21 August 1887; Stockholm, Sweden
- Died: 20 November 1981 (aged 94); Stockholm, Sweden
- Occupation: Actress
- Years active: 1906–1946

Stina Hedberg (born Amanda Kristina Sofia Ulrika Holm; 21 August 1887 – 20 November 1981) was a Swedish stage and film actress. She also appeared in eight films between 1936 and 1946. She was married to the writer Tor Hedberg from 1911 until his death in 1931.

== Selected filmography ==
- The Girls of Uppakra (1936)
- Sigge Nilsson och jag (1938)
- Children of Divorce (1939)
- Lucky Young Lady (1941)
- Turn of the Century (1944)
- Brita in the Merchant's House (1946)
- Incorrigible (1946)

== Bibliography ==
- Paietta, Ann C. Teachers in the Movies: A Filmography of Depictions of Grade School, Preschool and Day Care Educators, 1890s to the Present. McFarland, 2007.
- Waal, Carla. Harriet Bosse: Strindberg's Muse and Interpreter. Southern Illinois University Press, 1990.
