= Siege of Nakskov =

Dano-Swedish siege

- Part of the Dano-Swedish War (1657–1658)
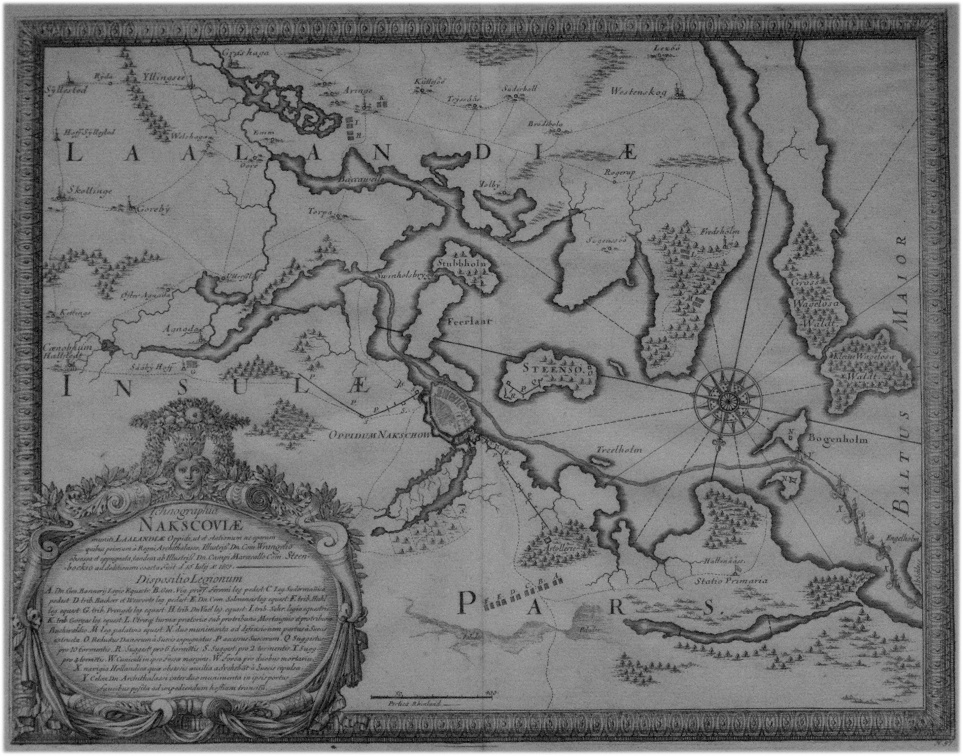
- Nakskov and its surroundings mapped by Swedish cartographers during the siege
Date	6–7 February, 1658
Location	Nakskov, Lolland
Result	Swedish victory
Territorial changes	Nakskov captured by Swedish forces

Belligerents
(yes) Swedish Empire	Denmark–Norway

Commanders and leaders
(Swedish Empire) Overbeck	(Denmark–Norway) Francis Edmondt (Denmark–Norway) Both (Denmark–Norway) Sten Brahe

Units involved
(Swedish Empire) One cavalry regiment	(Denmark–Norway) Nakskov garrison

Strength
Unknown	1,500 peasants 75 German cavalry 75 Scanian freeshooters 40 guns

Casualties and losses
Unknown	Unknown

The siege of Nakskov began on 6 February 1658, when a Swedish cavalry regiment under Överste Overbeck surrounded the city, and only one day later, the civilians in the town, not wanting to end up like Fredriksodde, which had been besieged and conquered by the Swedes, surrendered the city on February 7.

== Background ==
After a short rest, Charles X Gustav and the main body of the Swedish army continued marching past Nakskov, instead going towards Vordingborg. However, the Swedes realized they could not leave behind a strong and fortified city like Nakskov. It was a fairly significant town and its defenses were robust, with some 40 guns at its disposal, four being made from brass according to Charles X Gustav. In the city, there was also a garrison of 1,500 peasant troops, most likely recent recruits and inexperienced, but armed. There was one company of 75 German cavalry and another company of 75 Scanian freeshooters from Göinge, which is also where the Danish king, Frederick III, had taken men into his lifeguard. The city also held a large store of ammunition.

Ulrik Christian Gyldenløve's regiment, which was also on Lolland, had reportedly begun retreating towards Falster and Zealand.

The Göing'ers were known to be able to handle rifles effectively, and thus Nakskov had everything it needed to make it difficult for the Swedes.

However, the citizens of the city treated the garrison with contempt, refusing to give them food, and also refusing to help defend the city ramparts from the Swedes. They had heard of what had happened in Fredriksodde and wished to avoid any fighting in Nakskov. Additionally, they had heard of the Danish defeat at Tybrind vig.

== Siege ==
A Swedish trumpeter approached the city and blew a signal, notifying the defenders that the Swedes were open for negotiation. However, Edmondt refused any negotiations, and the trumpeter was dismissed with "a heap of mocking and insulting words" and three cannon shots. Leading to a Swedish cavalry regiment under Överste (Note: Equivalent to Colonel) Overbeck surrounding Nakskov. The commander of the city, the scarred and veteran English mercenary, Sir Francis Edmondt, prepared to fight. Other commanders of the city include a certain Colonel Both and Colonel Sten Brahe.

However, it would be the citizens of the city that decided, with some even saying; "Nakskov skall ej bliva något Fredriksodde.". On the night of February 7, after a short meeting in the city hall, one of the city's ports was opened, and out went a delegation consisting of the mayor and a few others with lanterns, attempting to negotiate with the Swedes. Corfitz Ulfeldt was sent to meet with the mayor and his people. They claimed that their intention was to surrender the city and asked for mercy pertaining to the insult against the trumpeter. Eventually, an agreement was signed, saving the city.

At 9 o'clock the next morning, the delegation came back, and once they were within earshot, they shouted:

Fred! fred, fred! Vi är fria borgare. Vi har kysst den svenske konungens hand, och han har belijat oss allt vi begärt.

An hour later, a Swedish force, 16 companies of cavalry, rode through the snow and advanced into the city. The people in the city rushed out of the churches from their ongoing Sunday services to see a delegation of the prominent men in the city handing over the keys to the city to the Swedes. Later, the citizens were forced to pay 20,000 riksdaler in ransom. Along with the ransom money, the Swedes eagerly took large amounts of ammunition, provisions, and all of the cannons, which gave them much-needed reinforcement. The peasant soldiers were forced to lay down their weapons and were sent home to farm. However, the Göinge soldiers and German cavalry were placed into the Swedish ranks.

== Aftermath ==
The city would later fall out of the Swedish perspective. On February 7, a Danish infantry force of 600 men had been on their way to reinforce the garrison but encountered a Swedish cavalry force, which promptly imprisoned them. Had they managed to get inside the fortress, they would have strengthened the morale of the Danes but most likely have forced the Swedes to storm the town.

== Works cited ==
- Isacson, Claes-Göran (2015). Karl X Gustavs krig: Fälttågen i Polen, Tyskland, Baltikum, Danmark och Sverige 1655-1660 [Wars of Charles X Gustav: The campaigns in Poland, Germany, the Baltics, Denmark and Sweden 1655-1660] (in Swedish). Historiska Media. ISBN 9789175450117.
- Carlbom, Johan Levin (1910). Karl X Gustav, från Weichseln till Bält, 1657 [Karl X Gustav, from Weichseln to the Belts, 1657] (in Swedish). Fahlcrantz' boktryckeri.
- Englund, Peter (2000). Den oövervinnerlige: om den svenska stormaktstiden och en man i dess mitt [The invincible: about the era of Swedish great power and a man in its midst] (in Swedish). Atlantis. ISBN 9789174869996.
- Essen, Michael Fredholm von (2023). Charles X's Wars: Volume 3 - The Danish Wars, 1657-1660. Helion & Company. ISBN 9781915113603.
