= Skilsmissens børn =

1939 film

- Directed by: Benjamin Christensen
- Written by: Alba Schwartz; Benjamin Christensen
- Starring: Grethe Holmer
- Cinematography: Valdemar Christensen
- Release date: 11 August 1939
- Running time: 91 minutes
- Country: Denmark
- Language: Danish

Skilsmissens børn is a 1939 Danish drama film directed by Benjamin Christensen.

== Cast ==
- Grethe Holmer as Vibeke
- Mathilde Nielsen
- Johannes Meyer as Kunstmaleren
- Sonja Steincke
- Svend Fridberg as Skørtejægeren
- Ellen Malberg
- Carlo Wieth
- Stina Hedberg
- Petrine Sonne
