= Tor Hedberg =

Swedish writer (1862–1931)

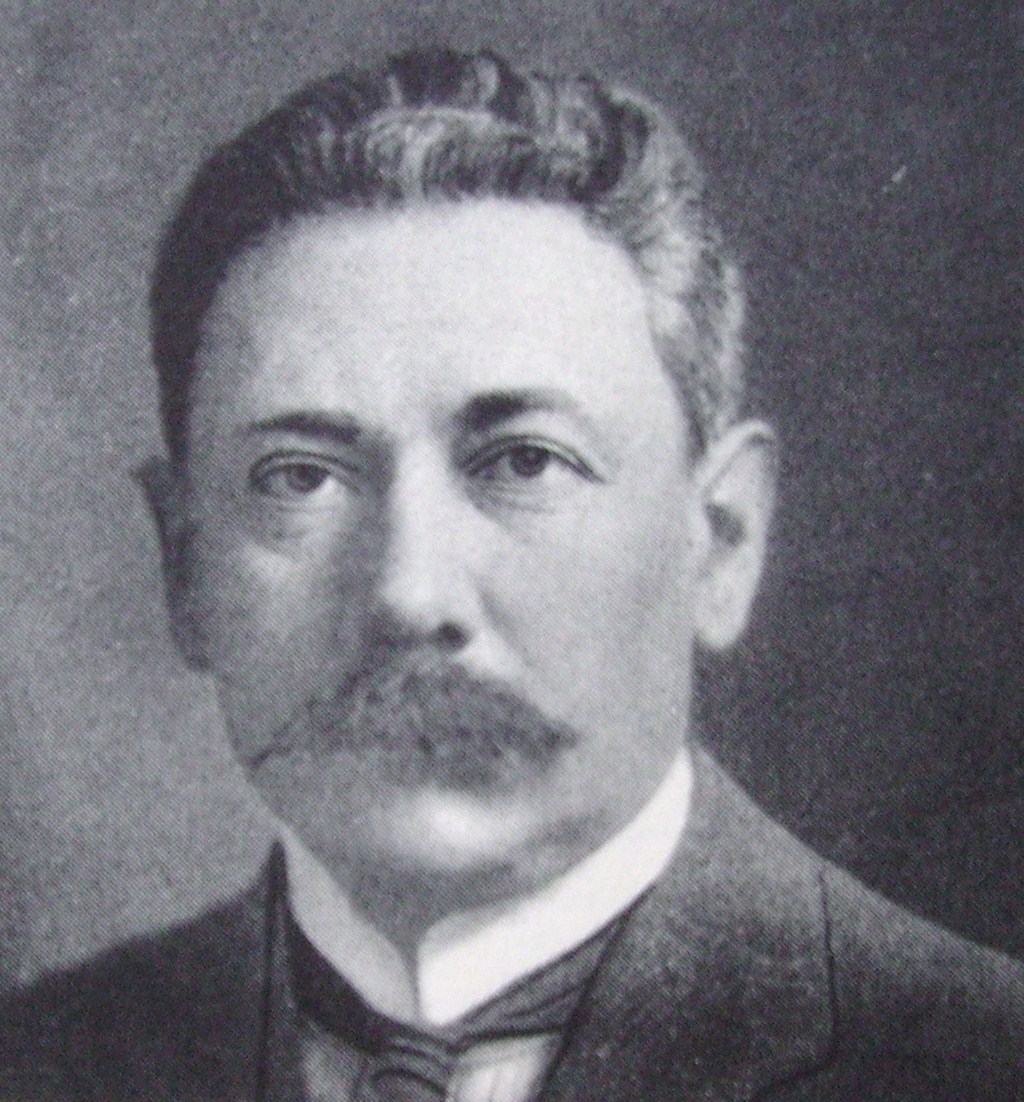
- Born: March 23, 1862; Stockholm, Sweden
- Died: July 13, 1931 (aged 69); Stockholm, Sweden
- Occupation(s): Writer, playwright, theater director, translator
- Spouse: Stina Hedberg
- Parents: Frans Hedberg (father); Amanda Broman (mother)

Tor Harald Hedberg (March 23, 1862 – July 13, 1931) was a Swedish writer, playwright, theater director, and translator.

Hedberg was the son of the writer Frans Hedberg. He worked as an art and literature critic for the newspaper Svenska Dagbladet from 1897 to 1907 and as an art critic for Dagens Nyheter from 1921 to 1931. From 1910 to 1922 he headed the Royal Dramatic Theatre, and from 1924 onward he was the head of the Thiel Gallery. He became a member of the Swedish Academy in 1922, and he was assigned chair number 4. Hedberg was married to the actress Stina Hedberg (née Holm).

== Selected works ==
- Högre uppgifter: berättelse (Higher Duties; A Story, 1884)
- Glädje: en fantasi (Joy: A Fantasy, 1889)
- Gerhard Grim: en dramatisk dikt (Gerhard Grim: A Dramatic Poem, 1897)
- Johan Ulfstjerna: skådespel i fem akter (Johan Ulfstjerna: A Play in Five Acts, 1907)
- Nationalmonumentet: ett lustspel (The National Monument: A Comedy, 1923)
