= Pieter van Abeele =

Dutch medallist and coiner

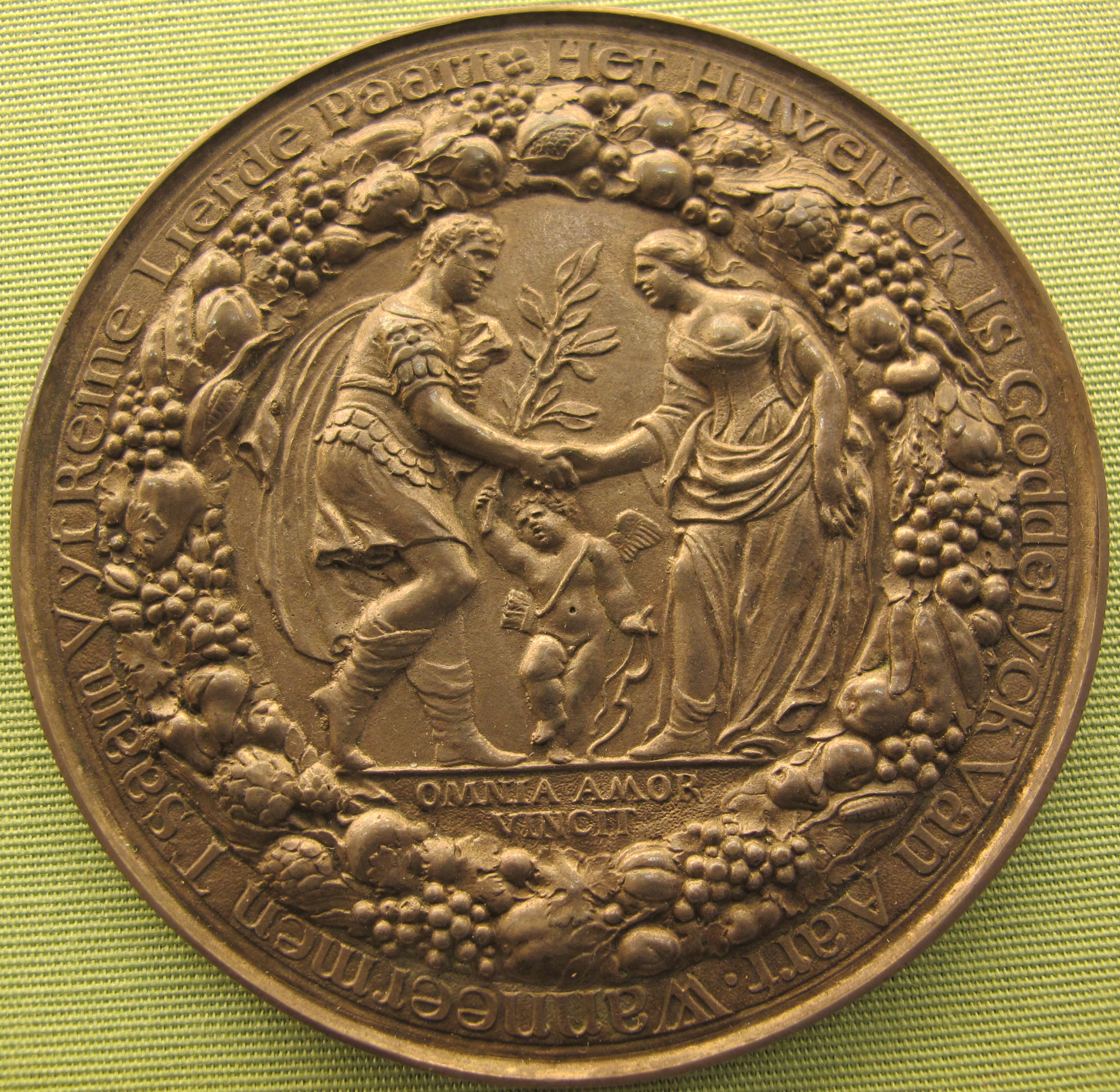
1660 medal

Pieter van Abeele (1608 - February 21, 1684 (buried)) was a Dutch medallist and coiner in Amsterdam.

Van Abeele was born in Middelburg. He perfected the technique of pressing hollow medals. He created the two sides of the medal separately and combined them with a ring of metal. His works are said to be the best of their time, and consist mostly of memorial and portrait medals. They depict several members of the House of Orange, Admiral Maarten Tromp, Jan Wolfert van Brederode, Charles X Gustav of Sweden and Charles II of England. He also made commemorative medals for the destruction of the English fleet and the peace of 1667, as well as one showing the granting of the coat of arms to the city of Amsterdam by Count William II of Holland and Emperor Maximilian I. He died in Amsterdam.

== Sources ==
- Allgemeine Deutsche Biographie - online version
- Muenzen-Lexikon.de
- Info at the Netherlands Institute for Art History
