= Ulrik Christian Gyldenløve (general) =

Danish nobleman (1630–1658)

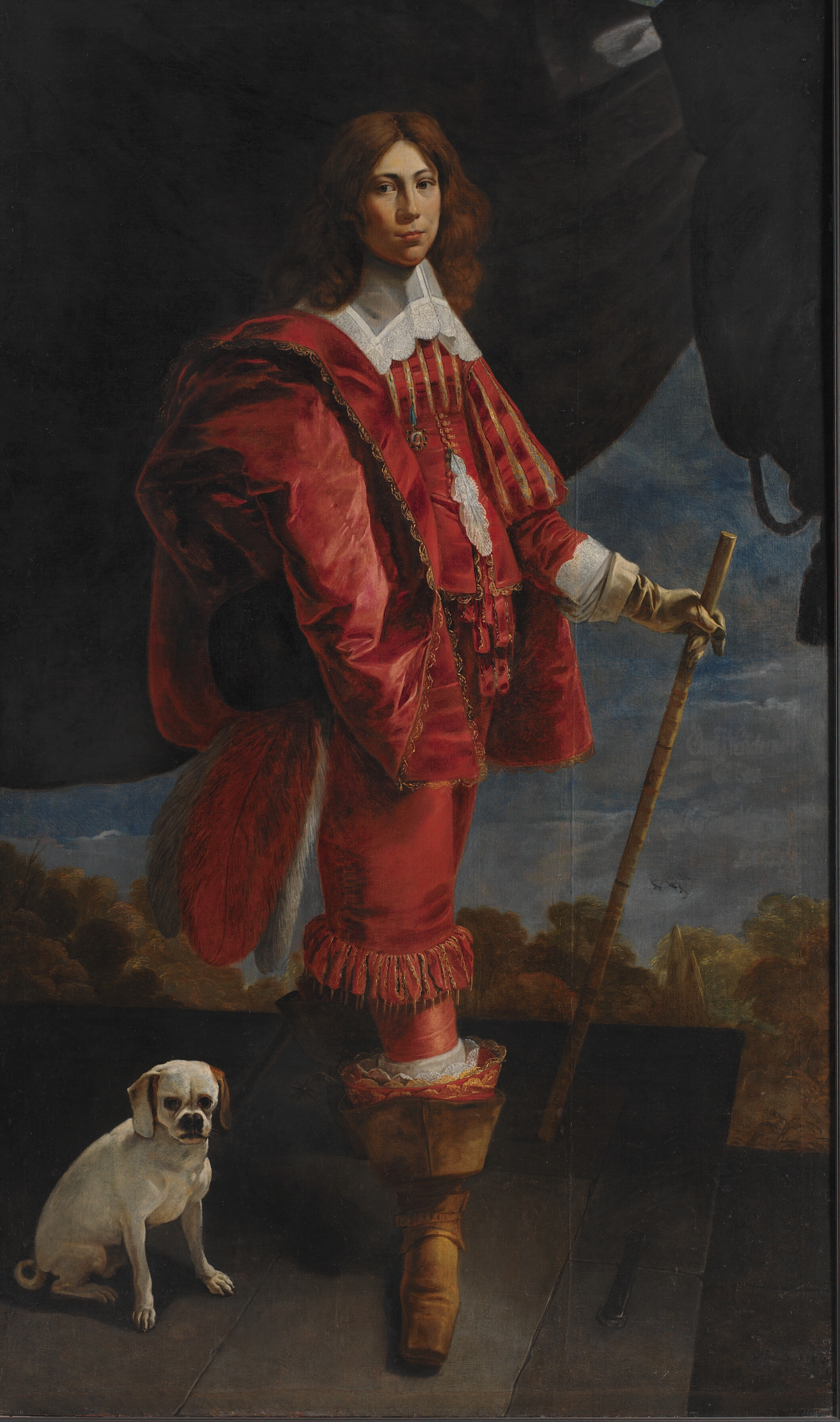
Portrait by Abraham Wuchters, 1645

Ulrik Christian Gyldenløve (7 April 1630 – 11 December 1658) was an illegitimate child of Christian IV of Denmark and his chambermaid and mistress Vibeke Kruse.

In February 1645, Gyldenløve was given the estate Skinnerup gård by his father. He was not impressed with its name nor its derelict condition. He rebuilt the manor and renamed it Ulriksholm. He was subsequently made a count.

Gyldenløve was general of the Realm (Danish: rigsgeneral) and commander-in-chief of the Danish army during the Dano-Swedish War of 1657–1658. Ulrik led the charge of a student army against the Swedish army during the siege of Copenhagen in 1658. When the Swedes stormed Kallebodstrand in Copenhagen, where Gyldenløve had his headquarters, a bloody struggle was fought between the Danish-Dutch defenders and the Swedish-German attackers. Gyldenløve was hit by several enemy gunshots.

The Gyldenløvesgade streets in Copenhagen and Odense are named after him. Gyldenløve was remembered by the Danish nobility and peasantry as one of Denmark's foremost military commanders.

== Legacy ==
Gyldenløvesgade in Copenhagen and Gyldenløvesgade in Odense are named after him.
