= Blanche Theatre =

Coordinates: 59.3325°N 18.0699°E

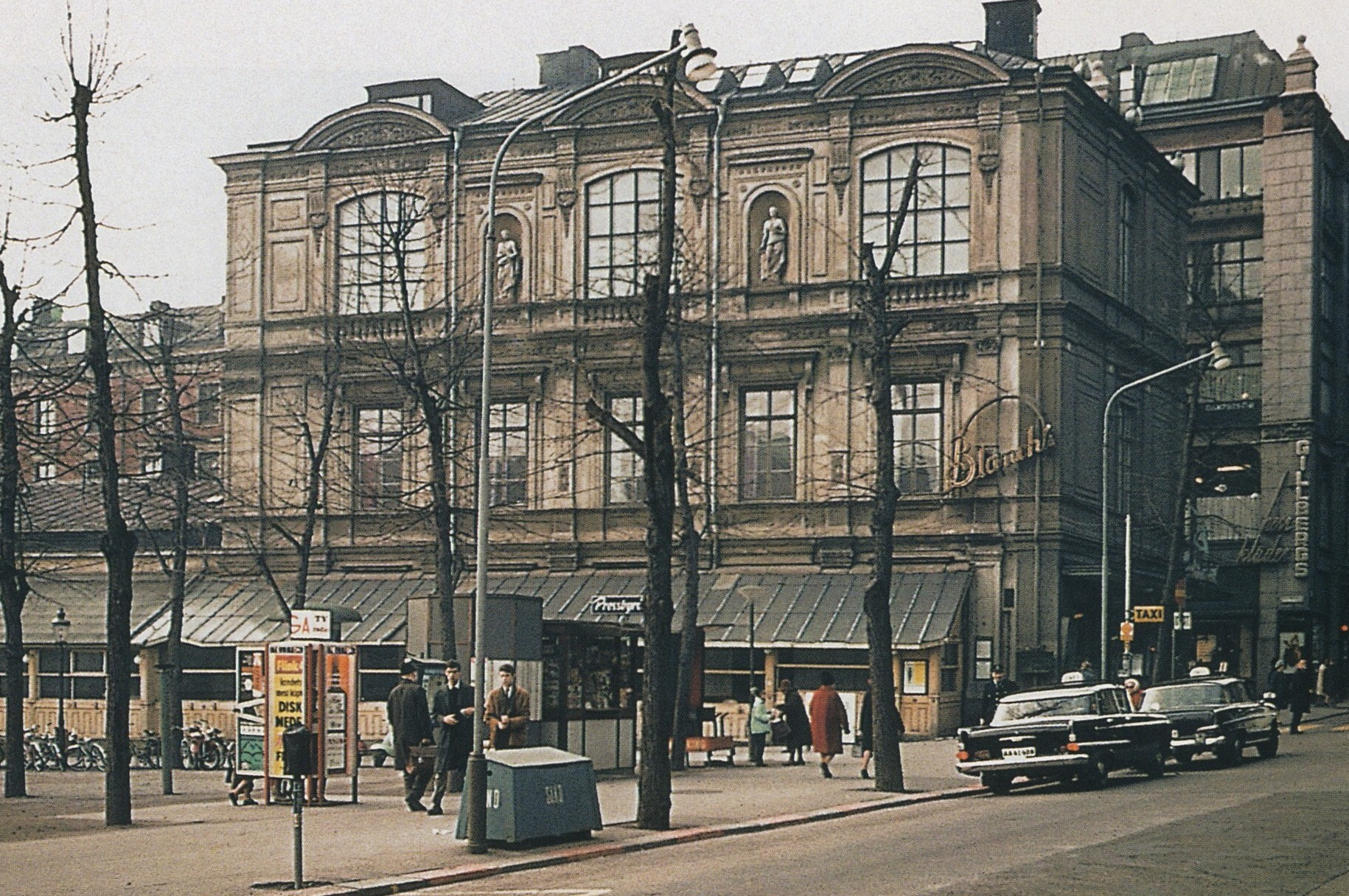
Blanchs Theatre in 1964, just before demolition.

Blanche Theatre or in Swedish Blancheteatern (before 1915 called Blanch's theater, and for a time the Vaudeville Theatre), was a private theater located in a building on West Tradgardsgatan next to Kungsträdgården in Stockholm, Sweden.

The theater opened on March 31, 1879. It originally showed vaudeville but was changed to an arts venue around the mid-1880s. Under the leadership of Ernst Eklund 1917-1926 there was a successful blend of revues, classic dramas and debate. In its last years it was used as an alternative venue by the Swedish Royal Opera.

The building was demolished in 1965 as part of a wholesale redevelopment of the Norrmalm district.
