= Fredrikstad =

Fredrikstad Municipality Fredrikstad kommune
- Municipality
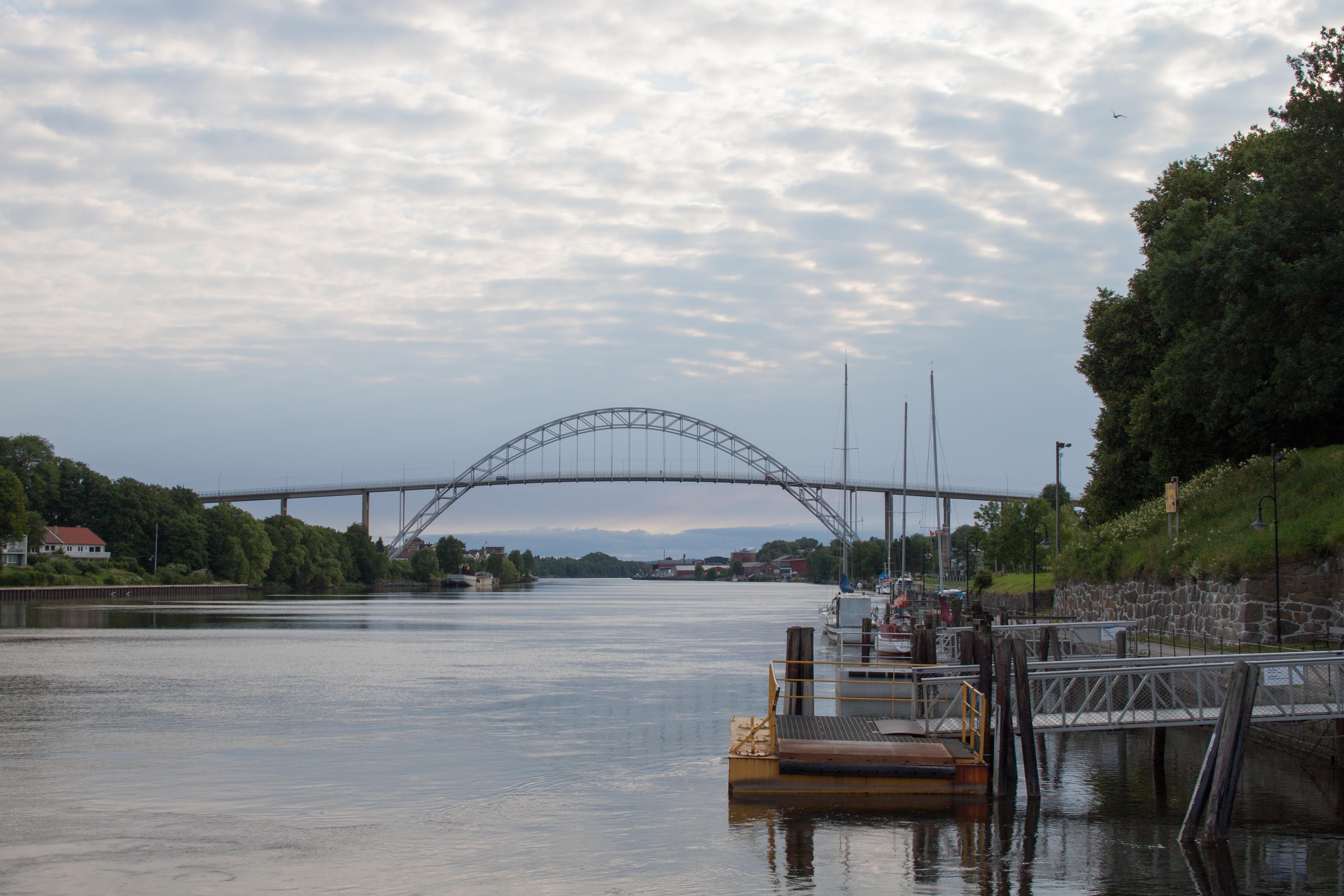
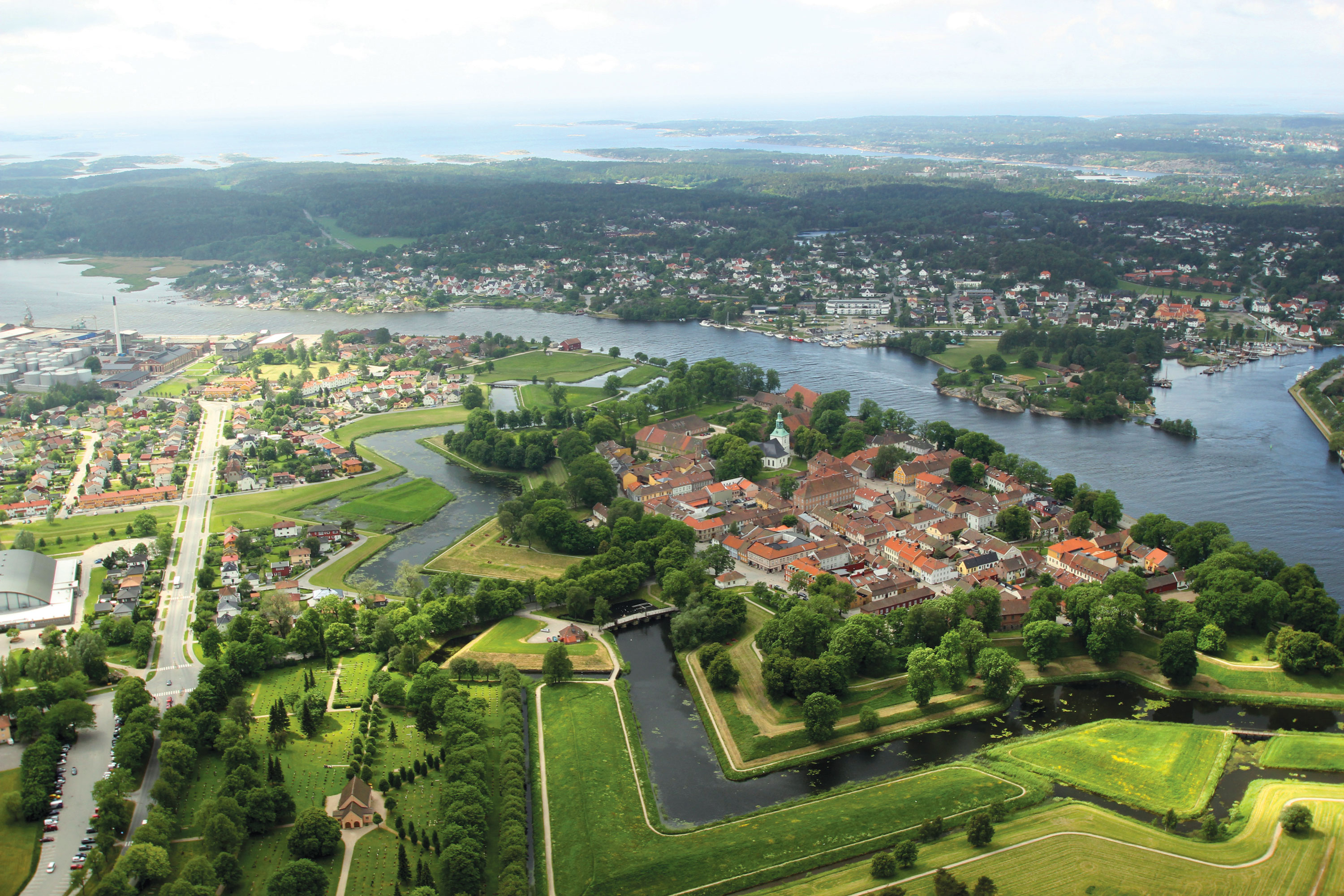
- Above: Panorama view of Glomma River and Fredrikstadbrua, from Fredrikstad Fortress; Bottom: Aerial view of Tøihusgaten and Isegran heritage town area

- Flag Coat of arms

- Østfold within Norway

- Fredrikstad within Østfold
- Coordinates: 59°12′19″N 10°57′0″E
- Country: Norway
- County: Østfold
- District: Eastern Norway
- Administrative centre: Fredrikstad

Government
  - Mayor (2023): Arne Sekkelsten (H)

Area
  - Total: 293 km^{2} (113 sq mi)
  - Land: 284 km^{2} (110 sq mi)
  - Rank: #269 in Norway

Population (31 December 2024)
  - Total: 85,862 ▲
  - Rank: #10 in Norway
  - Density: 293/km^{2} (760/sq mi)
  - Change (10 years): ▲ +8.6%

Official language
  - Norwegian form: Bokmål
- Time zone: UTC+01:00 (CET)
  - Summer (DST): UTC+02:00 (CEST)
- ISO 3166 code: NO-3107
- Website: Official website

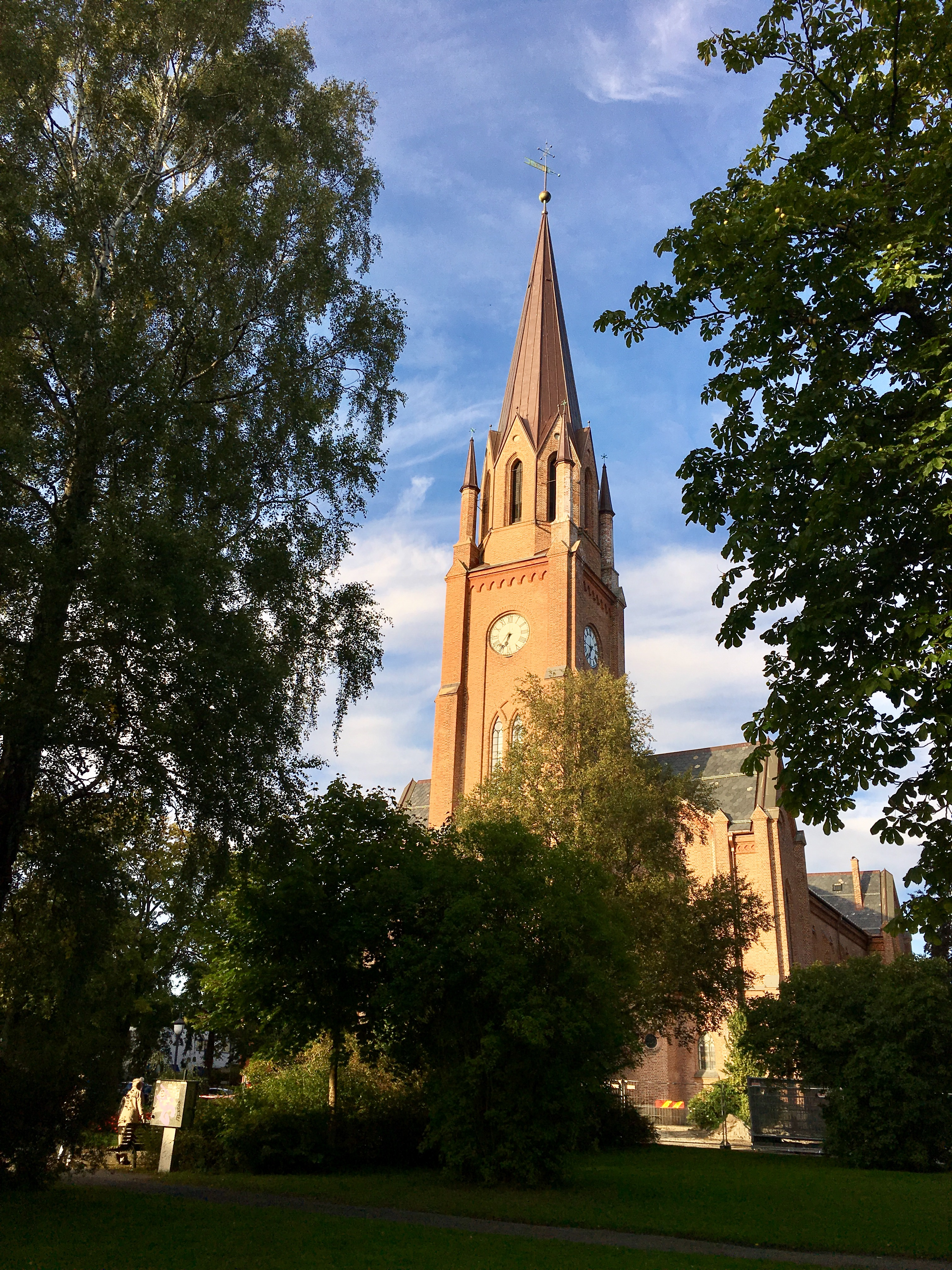
Fredrikstad Cathedral

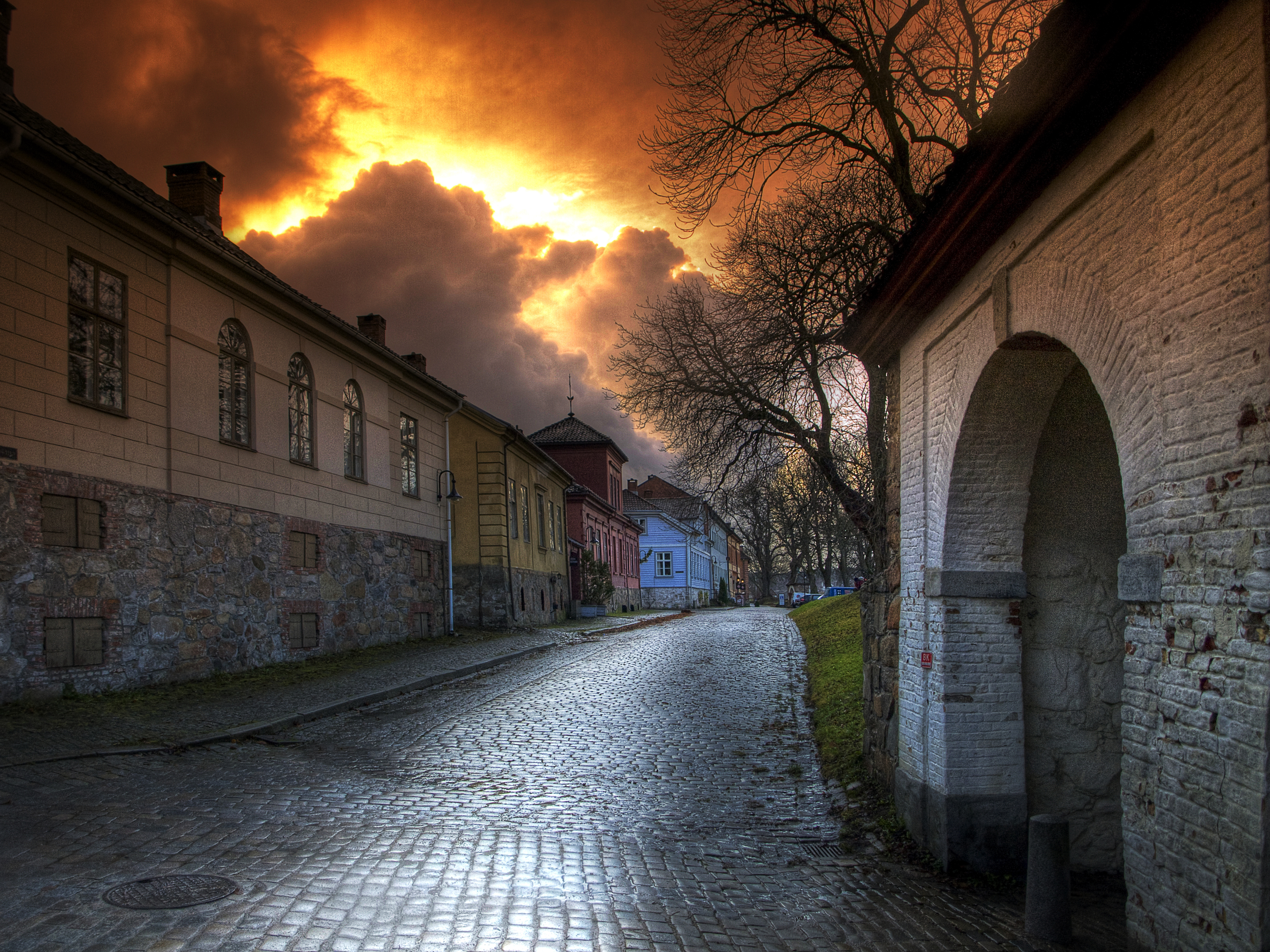
Old Town Fredrikstad

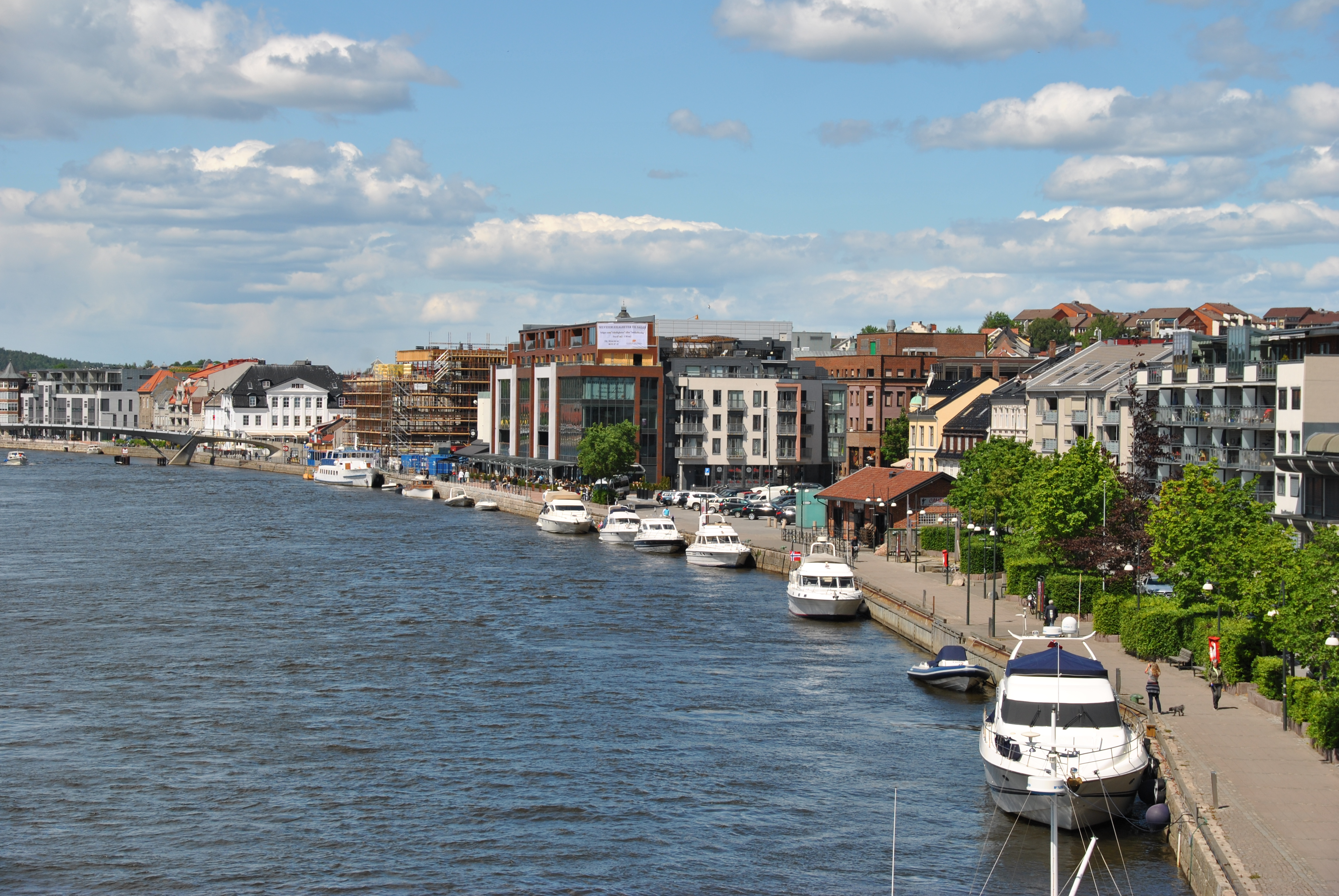
Riverside promenade in Fredrikstad

Fredrikstad (Norwegian: [ˈfrɛ̀drɪkstɑ]; previously Frederiksstad; literally "Fredrik's Town") is a port city and municipality in Østfold county, Norway. The administrative centre of the municipality is the city of Fredrikstad.

The city of Fredrikstad was founded in 1567 by King Frederick II, and established as a municipality on 1 January 1838 (see formannskapsdistrikt). The rural municipality of Glemmen was merged with Fredrikstad on 1 January 1964. The rural municipalities of Borge, Onsøy, Kråkerøy, and Rolvsøy were merged with Fredrikstad on 1 January 1994.

The city straddles the river Glomma where it meets the Skagerrak, about 20 kilometres (12 mi) from the Swedish border. Along with neighboring Sarpsborg, Fredrikstad forms the fifth largest city in Norway: Fredrikstad/Sarpsborg. As of 31 December 2024, according to Statistics Norway, these two municipalities have a total population of 146,001 with 85,862 in Fredrikstad and 60,139 in Sarpsborg.

Fredrikstad was built at the mouth of Glomma as a replacement after Sarpsborg (15 kilometres (9 miles) upstream) was burnt down by the Swedish Army in the 1500s. Some of the citizens stayed behind and rebuilt their old town at its original site and got their city status back in 1839.

The city centre is on the west bank of the Glomma, while the old town on the east bank is Northern Europe's best preserved fortified town.

Fredrikstad used to have a large sawmill industry and was an important harbour for timber export, then later on shipbuilding, until the main yard was closed in 1988. The main industries are currently various chemical plants and other light industry.

In 2005, Fredrikstad was the final host port for the Tall Ships' Race, attracting thousands to the city. In 2019, it was the first host port.

In 2017, Fredrikstad won the national award for most attractive city. The award is given yearly by the Norwegian government on the basis of social, economic and environmental factors.

== General information ==
=== Name ===
The city was named after the Danish king Frederick II in 1569. The last element stad means "city".

Prior to 1877, the name was spelled Frederiksstad, then from 1877 to 1888 it was written as Fredriksstad, and finally since 1889 it has been spelled in its current form: Fredrikstad.

=== Coat-of-arms ===
The coat-of-arms is from modern times. They were granted on 21 April 1967. The old arms are based on the oldest known seal of the city, which dates from 1610. They showed a fortress being guarded by a bear. Strangely, Fredrikstad had no fortifications in 1610 (it received some at the end of the 17th century). Fredrikstad was founded by citizens of Sarpsborg and both the fortress and the bear are taken from the old arms of Sarpsborg. The composition of the seal was also used as arms since the beginning of the 19th century. The new arms were granted at the 400th anniversary of the city in 1967 and show a more modern variation on the fortress and bear.

The government has asked all municipalities, to receive refugees on behalf of the government; in 2025, the municipality said "no", for that year.

== History ==
After Sarpsborg, which was founded by Olav the Holy in 1016, was burned to the ground by the Swedes during the Northern Seven Years' War, the ruling king, Frederik II, decided by royal decree to build a new town 15 kilometres (9 mi) south of the original location. The new town was founded in 1567 as Sarpsborg, regarded as a reconstruction of the original town. This new site's proximity to the sea and the accessible open land surrounding it made it a better location than the old one. The name Fredrikstad was first used in a letter from the King dated 6 February 1569. The temporary fortification built during the Hannibal War (1644–1645) between Sweden and Denmark-Norway, became permanent in the 1660s.

The work on the fortifications was first led by Willem Coucheron and later Johan Caspar von Cicignon. During the next 60 years, several fortifications at the Fredrikstad Fortress were built, including Isegran, Kongsten, and Cicignon. In 1735, a suburb on the western side of Glomma, Vestsiden, was founded. This part later grew faster than the old city, and became the dominant city centre. Most of the buildings in the old city burned down during a fire in 1764.

In the 1840s, timber exporting from Fredrikstad started to gain momentum. In the 1860s, several steam powered saws were built along the river, and in 1879 the railway reached Fredrikstad, leading to further growth. With the decline of the timber exports as a result of the modernization of wood-processing industries in the early 1900s, Fredrikstad's production changed to other types of products. It later became one of Norway's most important industrial centres, famous for its large shipyard, Fredrikstad Mekaniske Verksted.

== Economy ==
In 2026, 11,644 people, or just about one out of seven inhabitants, is classified as being part of a low-income family.

== Education ==
Fredrikstad has three high schools. Frederik II Upper Secondary School offers general studies and financial / administrative studies. It is a merger of the former Frydenberg Gymnastic and Christianslund Handelsgymnasium. Glemmen High School offers professional training and study. Wang Toppidrett Frederikstad offers sports, science, languages, social sciences and economics. In addition, there is a Steiner school, a private educational alternative.

Østfold University College offers higher education (master's and bachelor's studies) at the Academy of Performing Arts, Faculty of Health and Social Care and the Faculty of Engineering at Kråkerøy. Østfold Vocational College offers short professional craft or technical courses. The Department of Journalism offers primarily continuing education for journalists and editors.

== Sport ==
Fredrikstad is home to nine-time Norway football winners Fredrikstad FK who play at the Fredrikstad Stadion. Egil Olsen, manager for the Norwegian national football team, is from Fredrikstad. There is also an American football team, the Fredrikstad Eagles.

Fredrikstad has a top-division handball team, Fredrikstad BK, and a top-division ice hockey team, Stjernen Hockey.

The city also has a number of floorball teams, including Slevik IBK, Fredrikstad IBK and St. Croix Pirates.

== Transport ==
The city does not have an airport, the nearest airport is Sandefjord Airport which is located 88 kilometers (55 mi) west of Fredrikstad. Oslo Airport is also located 130 kilometers (81 mi) north of Fredrikstad.

== Notable residents ==
=== Public service ===
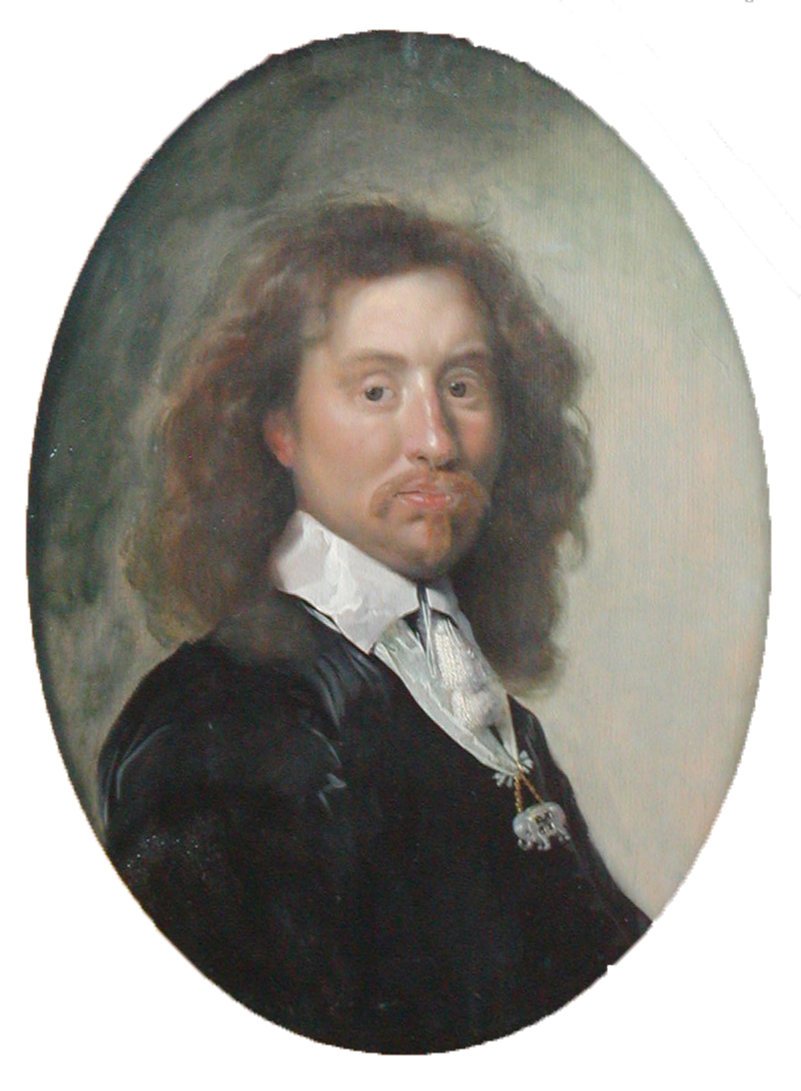
Henrik Bjelke, ca.1650

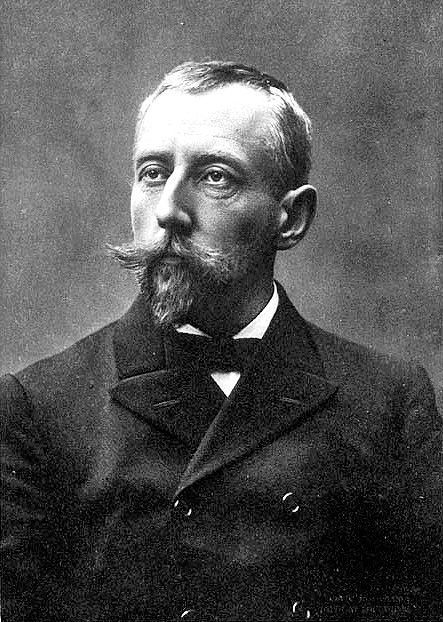
Roald Amundsen, ca.1908

- Albert Andriessen Bradt (ca.1607 in Fredrikstad – 1686) a Norwegian settler in New Netherland
- Henrik Bjelke (1615 on Onsøy – 1683) a Norwegian-Danish Admiral of the Realm 1662 to 1679
- Jørgen Bjelke (1621 on Onsøy – 1696) an officer and nobleman from Elingaard Manor
- Johan Caspar von Cicignon (ca.1625-1696) general and engineer, lived in Fredrikstad
- Hans Jacob Stabel (1769 in Onsøy – 1836) priest and rep. at Norwegian Constituent Assembly
- Hans Nielsen Hauge (1771 in Rolvsøy – 1824) revivalist preacher for the Hauge Synod
- Johannes Wilhelm Christian Dietrichson (1815 in Fredrikstad – 1883) a Lutheran Minister
- Ole Jacob Broch (1818 in Fredrikstad – 1889) physicist, economist and Govt. minister
- Ole Peter Petersen (1822 in Fredrikstad – 1901) founder of Methodism in Norway and co-founder of Norwegian and Danish Methodism in the United States
- Katti Anker Møller (1868–1945) feminist and advocate for reproductive rights
- Hieronymus Heyerdahl (1867 in Fredrikstad – 1959) lawyer and Mayor of Oslo, 1911 to 1914
- Waldemar Ager (1869 in Fredrikstad – 1941) newspaperman in Eau Claire, Wisconsin
- Johan Oscar Smith (1871 in Fredrikstad – 1943) founder of the Brunstad Christian Church
- Roald Amundsen (1872 in Borge – 1928) a Norwegian explorer of polar regions
- Charles Anderson (1875 in Fredrikstad – 1949) Mayor of Murray, Utah 1920–1923
- Nils F. Ambursen (1876 in Fredrikstad – 1953) civil engineer and inventor, designed dams
- Peder Kolstad (1878 in Borge – 1932) Prime Minister of Norway, 1931 to 1932
- Johannes Brun (1891 in Fredrikstad – 1977) military officer and bridge champion
- Tove Mohr (1891 in Thorsø – 1981) a physician, socialist and proponent for women's rights
- Jens Gram Jr. (1897 in Fredrikstad – 1982) barrister and politician
- Ragnvald Marensius Gundersen (1907 in Glemmen – 1985) Mayor of Fredrikstad 1945–1965
- Rolf Jørgen Fuglesang (1909 in Fredrikstad – 1988) Govt. minister in WWII for Vidkun Quisling
- Bernt Karsten Øksendal (born 1945 in Fredrikstad) a Norwegian mathematician
- Svein Aaser (born 1946 in Fredrikstad) former CEO of DnB NOR, the large financial group
- Tore Eriksen (born 1947 in Fredrikstad) economist, diplomat and civil servant; "Norway's most powerful bureaucrat"
- Louise Kathrine Dedichen (born 1964 in Fredrikstad) Vice-admiral, rep. on the NATO Military Committee

=== Arts ===
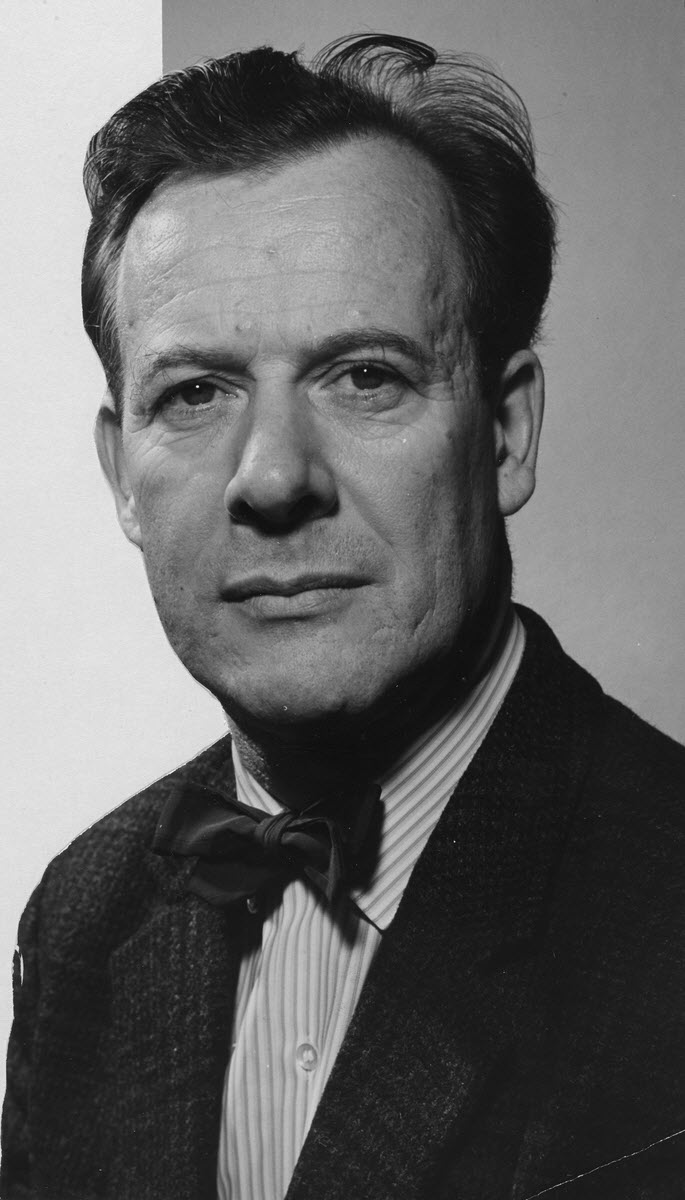
Karsten Andersen, 1964

- Eyvind Alnæs (1872 in Fredrikstad – 1932) composer, pianist, organist and choir director
- Harald Heide (1876 in Fredrikstad – 1956) violinist, conductor and composer
- Hans Jacob Nilsen (1897 in Fredrikstad – 1957) actor, theatre director and film director
- Tore Segelcke (1901 in Fredrikstad – 1979) actress
- Herbert Herding, stage name Herberth (1904 in Fredrikstad – 1958) revue writer, revue artist, and theater director
- Georg Løkkeberg (1909 in Fredrikstad – 1986) actor and theatre director
- Herman Hebler (1911-2007) a printmaker and graphic artist, lived in Fredrikstad
- Karsten Andersen (1920 in Fredrikstad – 1997) conductor
- Arne Dørumsgaard (1921 in Fredrikstad – 2006) composer, poet and music collector
- Bjørn Johansen (1940 in Fredrikstad – 2002) an influential Norwegian jazz musician
- Gerd Brantenberg (born 1941) author, teacher and feminist writer, grew up in Fredrikstad
- Jon Mostad (born 1942 in Fredrikstad) composer
- Terje Formoe (born 1949 in Fredrikstad) singer/songwriter, actor, playwright and author
- Jørn Christensen (born 1959) artist, actor and record producer
- Dennis Storhøi (born 1960 in Fredrikstad) actor
- Petronella Barker (born 1965) British-born Norwegian actress, grew up in Fredrikstad
- Harald Zwart (born 1965) Dutch-Norwegian film director, grew up in Fredrikstad
- Andy LaPlegua (born 1975 in Fredrikstad) singer / songwriter, founded Combichrist, Icon of Coil and Panzer AG

=== Sport ===
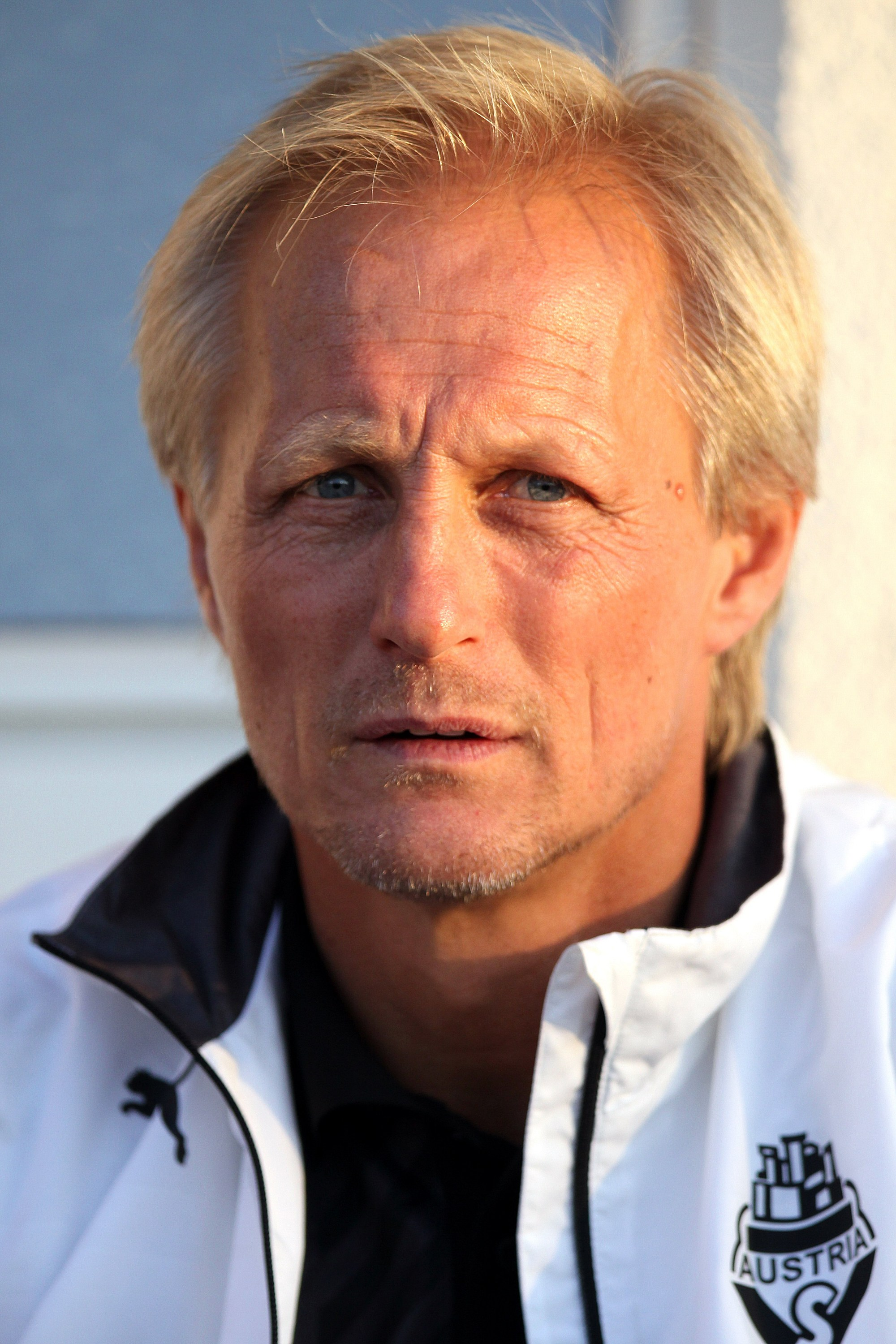
Jørn Andersen, 2015

- Charles Hoff (1902 in Fredrikstad – 1985) athlete, coach, and sports journalist
- Arne Pedersen (1931 in Fredrikstad – 2013) footballer with Fredrikstad FK, with 231 club caps and 40 for Norway
- Roar Johansen (1935 in Fredrikstad – 2015) footballer and manager with Fredrikstad FK, with 190 club caps and 61 for Norway
- Egil "Drillo" Olsen (born 1942 in Fredrikstad) manager of Norway national football team
- Per Egil Ahlsen (born 1958 in Fredrikstad) footballer with 350 club caps and 54 for Norway
- Harald Huysman (born 1959 in Frederikstad), racing driver
- Jørn Andersen (born 1963 in Fredrikstad) football manager with 454 club caps, 27 for Norway
- Erik Lund (born 1979 in Fredrikstad) former rugby union footballer
- Kari Mette Johansen (born 1979 in Fredrikstad) team handballer, twice Olympic team champion
- Stian Paulsen (born 1987 in Frederikstad), racing driver
- Isabell Herlovsen (born 1988) footballer with 133 caps with Norway women; lives in Fredrikstad
- Tarik Elyounoussi (born 1988) footballer, played for Fredrikstad FK, 60 caps with Norway
- Vegard Stake Laengen (born 1989) professional cyclist for UAE Team Emirates, lives in Fredrikstad
- Jørgen Strand Larsen (born 2000 in Frederikstad) footballer with Crystal Palace F.C., with 24 caps for Norway national football team
- Oliver Solberg (born 2001 in Frederikstad) Swedish-Norwegian rally driver

Number of minorities (1st and 2nd generation) in Fredrikstad by country of origin in 2021
Ancestry	Number
Iraq	2,348
Somalia	1,626
Poland	1,500
Kosovo	893
Syria	813
Sweden	715
Bosnia-Herzegovina	667
Iran	548
Lithuania	417
Afghanistan	382
Denmark	314
Russia	307
Thailand	291
Germany	277
Philippines	261
Eritrea	254
Vietnam	215

== International relations ==
=== Twin towns – sister cities ===
The following cities are twinned with Fredrikstad:

City	Region	Country
Aalborg	North Denmark Region	Denmark
Húsavík	(Iceland) Suður-Þingeyjarsýsla	Iceland
Kotka	Kymenlaakso	Finland
Karlskoga	Örebro	Sweden
Patzún	(Guatemala) Chimaltenango	Guatemala
San Martín Jilotepeque	(Guatemala) Chimaltenango	Guatemala
Zhuzhou	(China) Hunan	China

== See also ==
- Norsk Teknisk Porselen
