= Fredrikstad Fortress =

Building in Norway

Coordinates: 59.2034°N 10.9542°E

Fredrikstad festning
- Fredrikstad, Norway
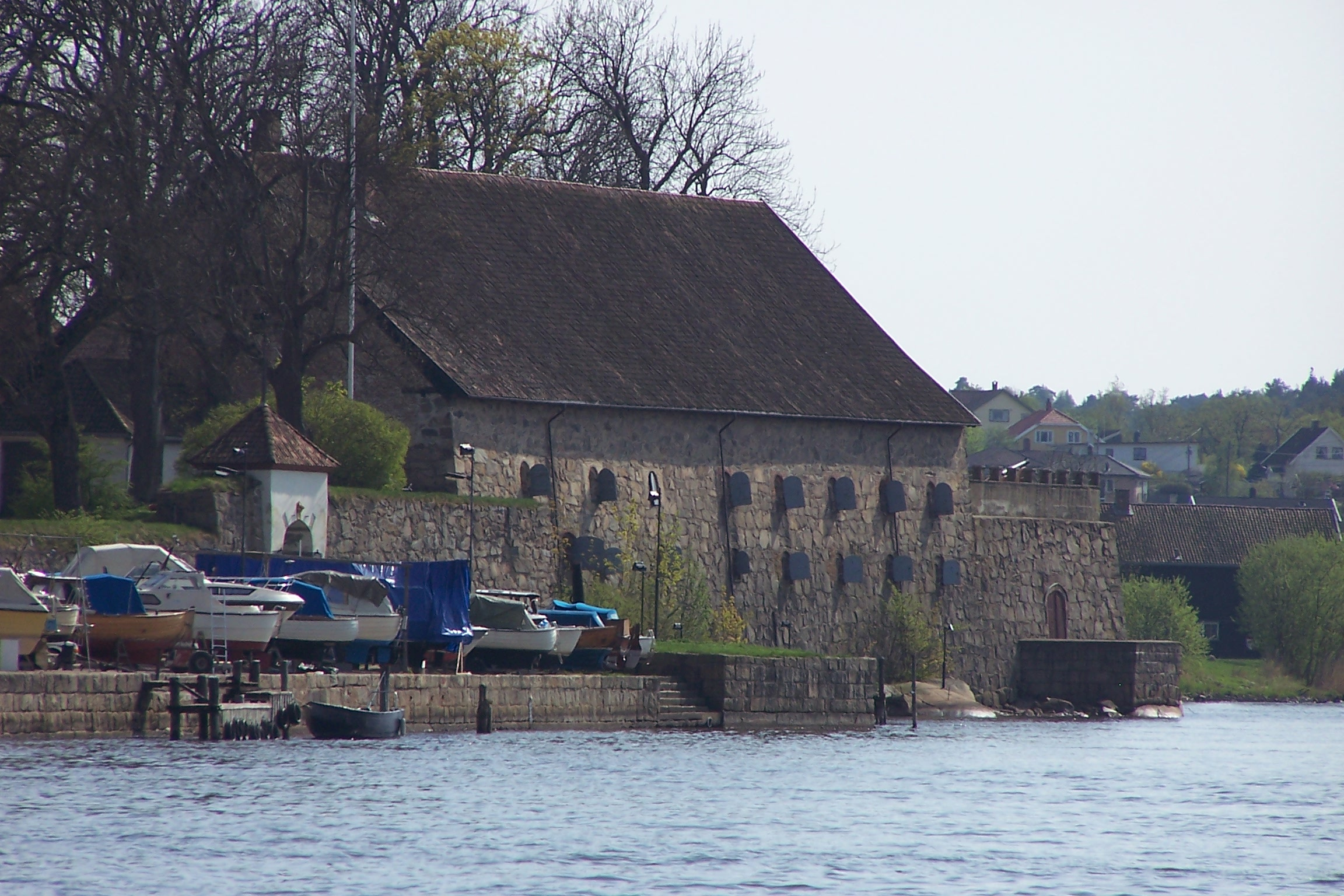
- The fortress and the city's oldest building

Site information
- Controlled by: Norway

Site history
- Built: 1663–1666
- In use: 1663–1903 (fort) –2002 (garrison)
- Battles/wars: Swedish invasion 1814

Fredrikstad fortress (Fredrikstad festning) was a fortification in Fredrikstad, Norway. It was the base of the Østfold Regiment, with defence related responsibilities for the east side of Oslofjord.

== History ==
Fredrikstad Fortress was constructed between 1663 and 1666 by the officer Willem Coucheron and his son Anthony Coucheron following the order of the Dano-Norwegian King Frederick II. A temporary fortification had previously been built on the site during the Torstenson War (1644–1645) between Sweden and Denmark–Norway.

The first commander was appointed 6 January 1662; he was Lieutenant Colonel Johan Eberhard Speckhan, succeeded by Johan von Fircks in 1663. Besides the fortress the prison works was also under the supervision of the commander of Fredrikstad fortress. In 1716 the fortress was used by the naval hero Peter Tordenskjold when he attacked the Swedish fleet during the Battle of Dynekilen.

The only time the fortress were attacked was during the Swedish–Norwegian War (1814). The fortress, under the command of Nils Christian Frederik Hals, capitulated on 4 August 1814.

The fortress was closed in 1903, but continued to serve as a garrison. Fredrikstad fortress is unique in Norway by being the only fortress that is preserved as it was. The remaining military installations in Fredrikstad were closed in 2002 and today the fortress with its mix of old buildings and art exhibitions is very popular for visitors.

== Fortifications ==
The fortifications in Fredrikstad included:

- Kongsten fort
- Isegran fort
- Cicignon fort
- Huth fort
- Akerøya fort
- Slevik battery

== Other sources ==
- Lisk, Jill The Struggle for Supremacy in the Baltic: 1600–1725 (Funk & Wagnalls, New York, 1967)
- Oppegaard, Tore Hiorth Østfold regiment, 1996
