= Battle of Genevadsbro =

Dano-Swedish battle

- Part of the Dano-Swedish War (1657–1658)
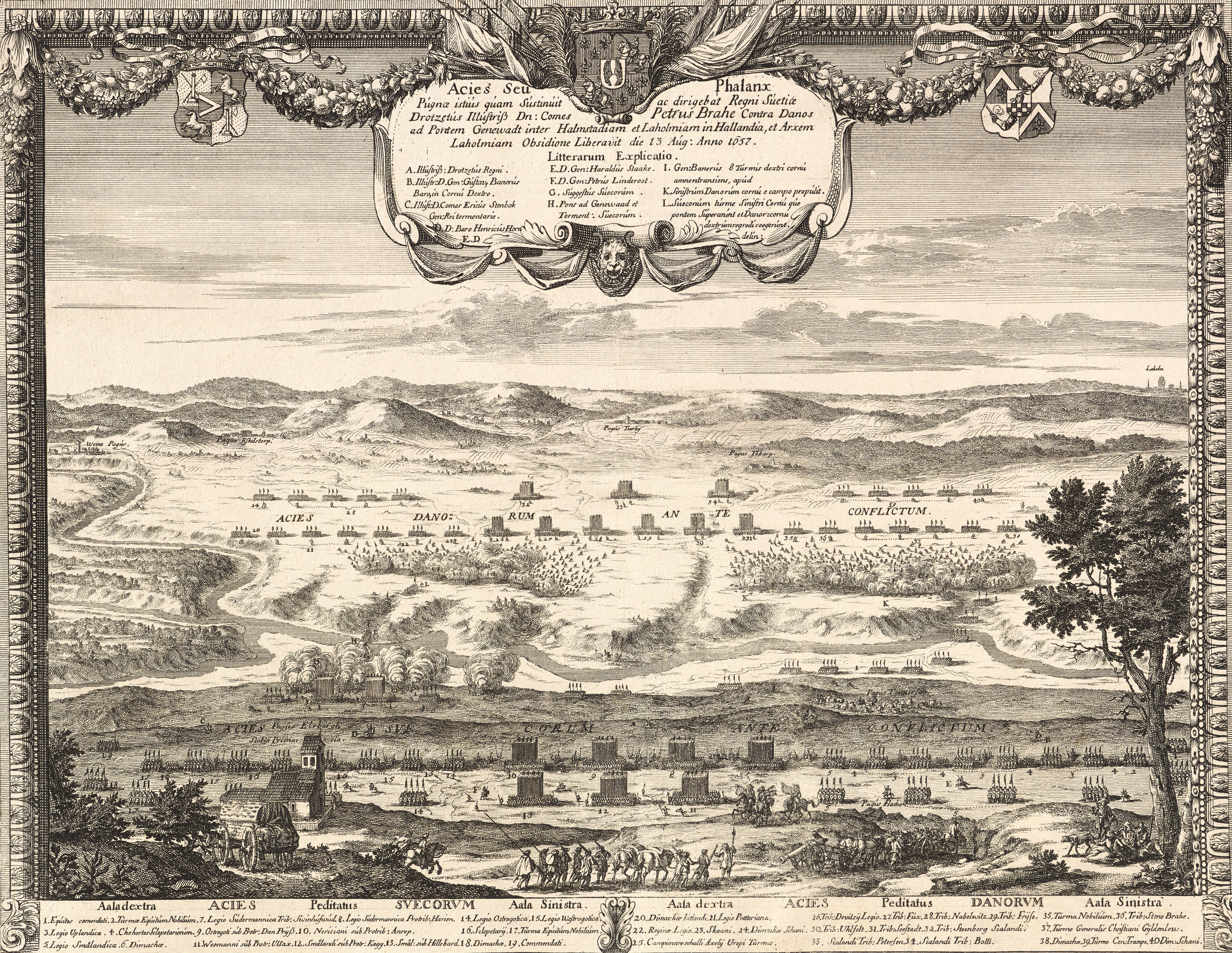
- Depiction of the battle of Genevadsbro by Erik Dahlbergh
| Date | 31 August 1657 |
| Location | Laholm, Halland |
| Result | Swedish victory |
| Territorial changes | Danish forces repulsed from Laholm |

Belligerents
| (yes) Swedish Empire | Denmark–Norway |

Commanders and leaders
| (Swedish Empire) Per Brahe the Younger (Swedish Empire) Gustaf Banér (Swedish Empire) Erik Stenbock (Swedish Empire) Henrik Horn | (Denmark–Norway) Axel Urup (Denmark–Norway) Ulrik Christian Gyldenløve |

Units involved
| (Swedish Empire) Laholm garrison (Swedish Empire) Relief force | Unknown |

Strength
| c. 6,000 men 4 guns | 6,000 men |

Casualties and losses
| 20–30 killed 100 wounded | 60 killed 50 wounded |

The Battle of Genevadsbro (Swedish: Slaget vid Genevadsbro; Danish: Slaget ved Genevadsbro) also referred to as simply Battle of Genevad was fought between Danish forces besieging Laholm and a Swedish relief force 31 August 1657. The battle ended with a Swedish victory.

== Background ==
Across the village of Vallen, around halfway to Örkelljunga, the Danish army marched northwards, constantly engaging in small skirmishes with Swedish patrols. Per Brahe the Younger, whose army was smaller than its Danish counterpart, avoided coming into a large battle and instead withdrew from his position at Laholm and instead marched to Halmstad on 20 August.

Axel Urup, who witnessed the Swedish withdrawal, send 500 infantry to investigate Laholm. They discovered that there were no Swedes in the city, instead being in the castle. Urup settled into the old Swedish camp outside the castle, which used to be a strong fortification but had been neglected and was in poor condition. However, there were still several buildings, embankments still existed, along with several functional bastions. The Danes quickly began digging trenches and they began bombarding the walls of the castle, but they failed to breach it, with it being defended by a force commanded by Johan Wäsenberg, and the Swedes repulsed every Danish storming attempt.

=== Prelude ===
Brahe, who was at Halmstad with his army, realized he would need reinforcements in order to repel Urup's forces. Thus, on 17 August, he ordered Field Marshal Robert Douglas, who was in Gothenburg with a sizable force, to help him. The same order was sent to Harald Stake who was stationed at Vänersborg. On 24 August, Stake marched from Vänersborg with his troops and on the 26, Douglas left Gothenburg with his army along with four cannons. On 30 August, Douglas had arrived in Halmstad, and once Stake arrived as well, Brahe's forces amounted to some 6,000 men.

== Battle ==
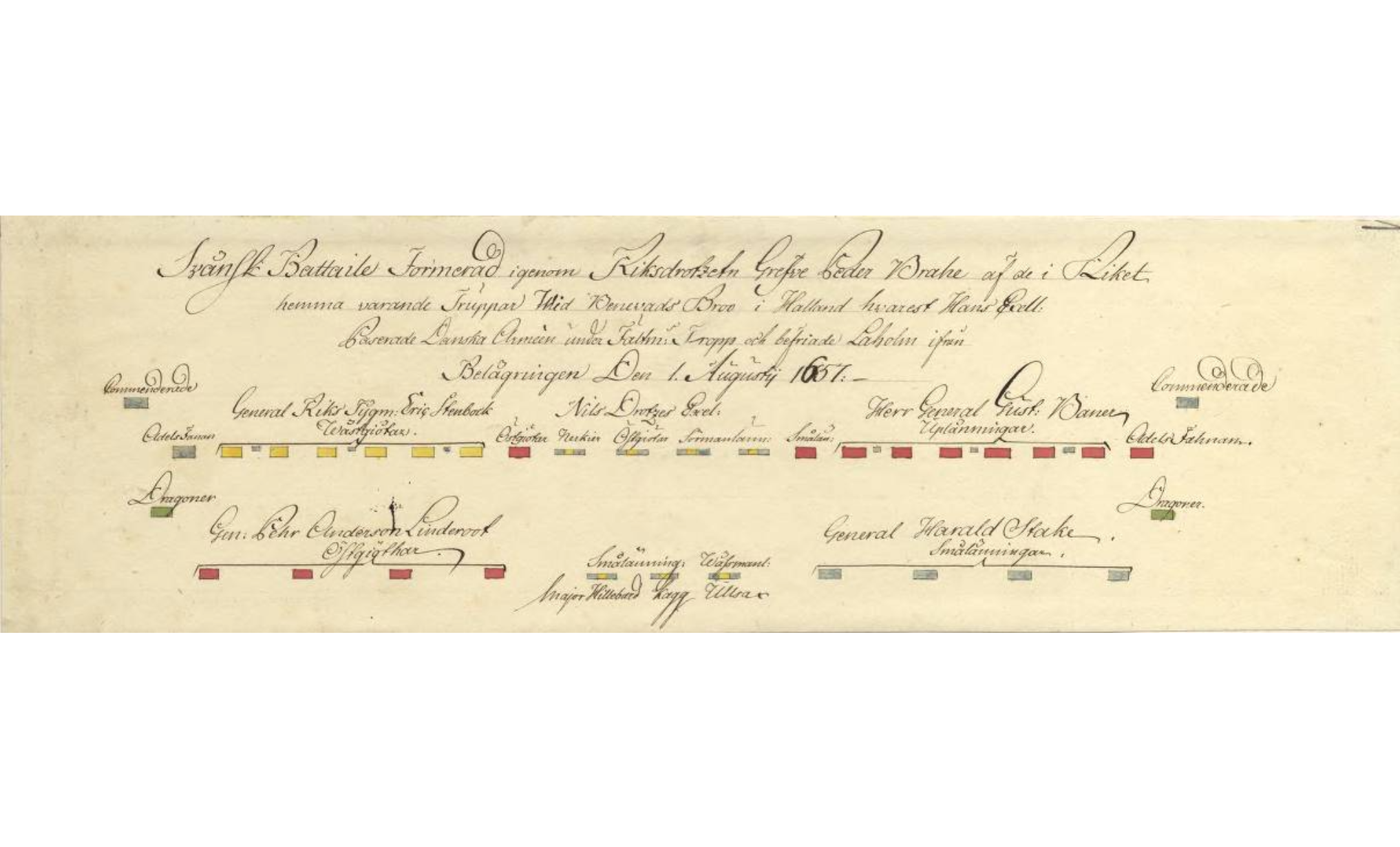
Swedish battle line formed at Genevadsbro in Halland

After receiving the reinforcements, Brahe marched back to Laholm at 6:00 AM in order to end the Danish siege of the castle. At the Genevad river on 31 August, close to Eldsberga in the middle of Halmstad and Laholm, Brahe encountered the Danish army, which stood on the other side of the river, since Urup had received word of the Swedish advance and wanted to risk battle.

The Swedish army consisted of 28 squadrons and seven brigades. The battle formation was placed along the heights north of the river and was very long. As usual, it was arranged into two different lines. The right wing was commanded by General Gustaf Banér, with several battalions being led by General Erik Stenbock, and the left wing by Lieutenant General Henrik Horn. These wings usually consisted of only cavalry, but some infantry and cannons were also placed in the first lines of the wings. The Danish army, much like the Swedish one, was arranged into two lines, consisting of six companies of cavalry and some infantry on the right wing. The Danish center consisted of nine infantry battalions, and their left wing had 11 companies of cavalry. The Danes were positioned parallel to the Swedish army on the opposite side of the river. The Danish army all in all was around 6,000 men large.

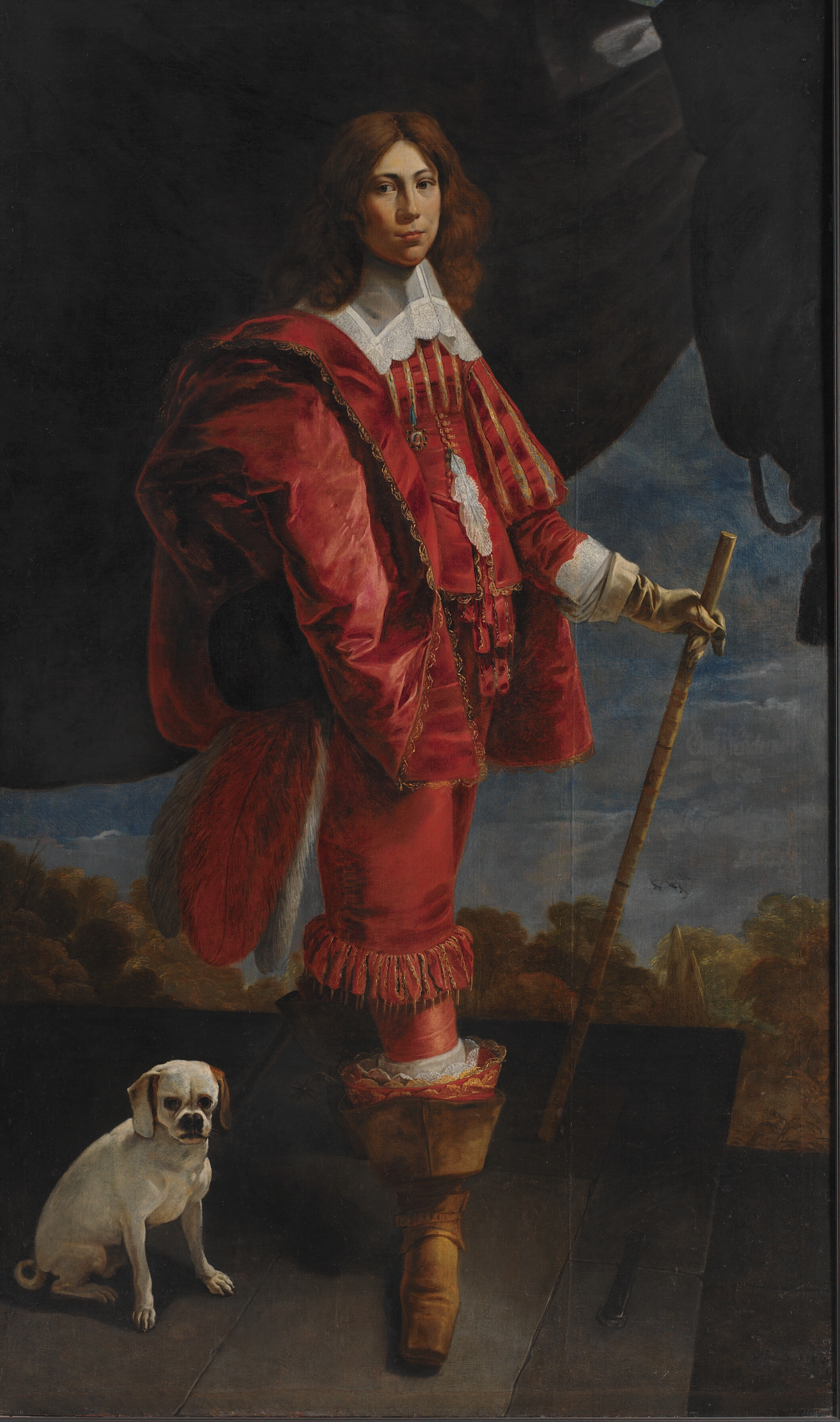
Portrait of Ulrik Christian Gyldenløve by Abraham Wuchters

The battle finally began when Ulrik Christian Gyldenløve, commanding 500 men, tried to cross the bridge across the river. The Swedes, however, managed to stall the attack long enough for the bridge to be set on fire, stopping the crossing. The cannons then began firing, and it turned into an artillery battle. The wind came from the north, blowing thick clouds of gunpowder smoke into the faces of the Danes. Brahe wrote in his report of the battle that it "was a hard fight of artillery and infantry" which is likely considering that thousands of muskets and cannons were firing constantly.

The battle continued from around 4:00 PM to 10:00 PM, when the darkness made further fighting impossible. However, before that, the Swedish infantry had managed to cross the river and charged up the hill with pikes and swords where the Danish artillery was stationed, where the Danes were promptly repelled from their positions and forced to retreat. The Swedes suffering about 20–30 killed and 100 wounded, with the Danes suffering 60 killed and 50 wounded.

== Aftermath ==
In the evening, the Danish army retreated towards Laholm, where they lifted the siege after burning their camp, and promptly crossed the Hallandsåsen towards Helsingborg. The Swedes pursued them, and by September 1, Laholm was back in Swedish control.

== Works cited ==
- Isacson, Claes-Göran (2015). Karl X Gustavs krig: Fälttågen i Polen, Tyskland, Baltikum, Danmark och Sverige 1655-1660 [Wars of Charles X Gustav: The campaigns in Poland, Germany, the Baltics, Denmark and Sweden 1655-1660] (in Swedish). Historiska Media. ISBN 9789175450117.
- Sundberg, Ulf (2010). Sveriges krig 1630-1814 [Sweden's wars 1630–1814] (in Swedish). Svenskt militärhistoriskt bibliotek. ISBN 9789185789634.
- Tegnhed, Stina (2015). "Slaget vid Genevad" (PDF). kundftp.datahalland.se. Kulturmiljö Halland.
- Englund, Peter (2000). Den oövervinnerlige: om den svenska stormaktstiden och en man i dess mitt [The invincible: about the era of Swedish great power and a man in its midst] (in Swedish). Atlantis. ISBN 9789174869996.
