= Johan von Fircks =

Danish officer

- Died: January 3, 1667; Fredrikstad Fortress
- Spouse: Anna van der Wisch
- Relatives: Magnus von Fircks and Anna von Syberg
- Military career
- Allegiance: Danish
- Branch: Army
- Rank: Major General
- Commands: Fredrikstad Fortress
- Conflicts: Dano-Swedish War (1657–58)

Johan von Fircks (died January 3, 1667) was a Danish officer. He was the son of the Courland landowner Magnus von Fircks and his wife Anna von Syberg.

Von Fircks became a captain in the Danish army in 1641. That same year he married the widow of Ditlev Rantzau til Clewitz, Anna van der Wisch, a daughter of Johan van der Wisch. Later he served at Åby in Norway and Blansgård in Sundeved. In 1645 he served in the Norwegian Army under Hannibal Sehested with the rank of lieutenant colonel as a cavalry commander, and in 1648 he was made commander of the regiment at Båhus.

That he was considered an experienced officer familiar with war is indicated by the fact that Frederick III of Denmark called him home from Norway in order to take part in the negotiations with the diet at Odense in February 1657, when it had nearly been decided to go to war against Sweden. In April that same year he was appointed deputy commander of the Norwegian army under Iver Krabbe. He distinguished himself in the campaign, and he was promoted to major general and named commander at Fredrikstad Fortress in 1663, where he died.
