= Norsk Teknisk Porselen =

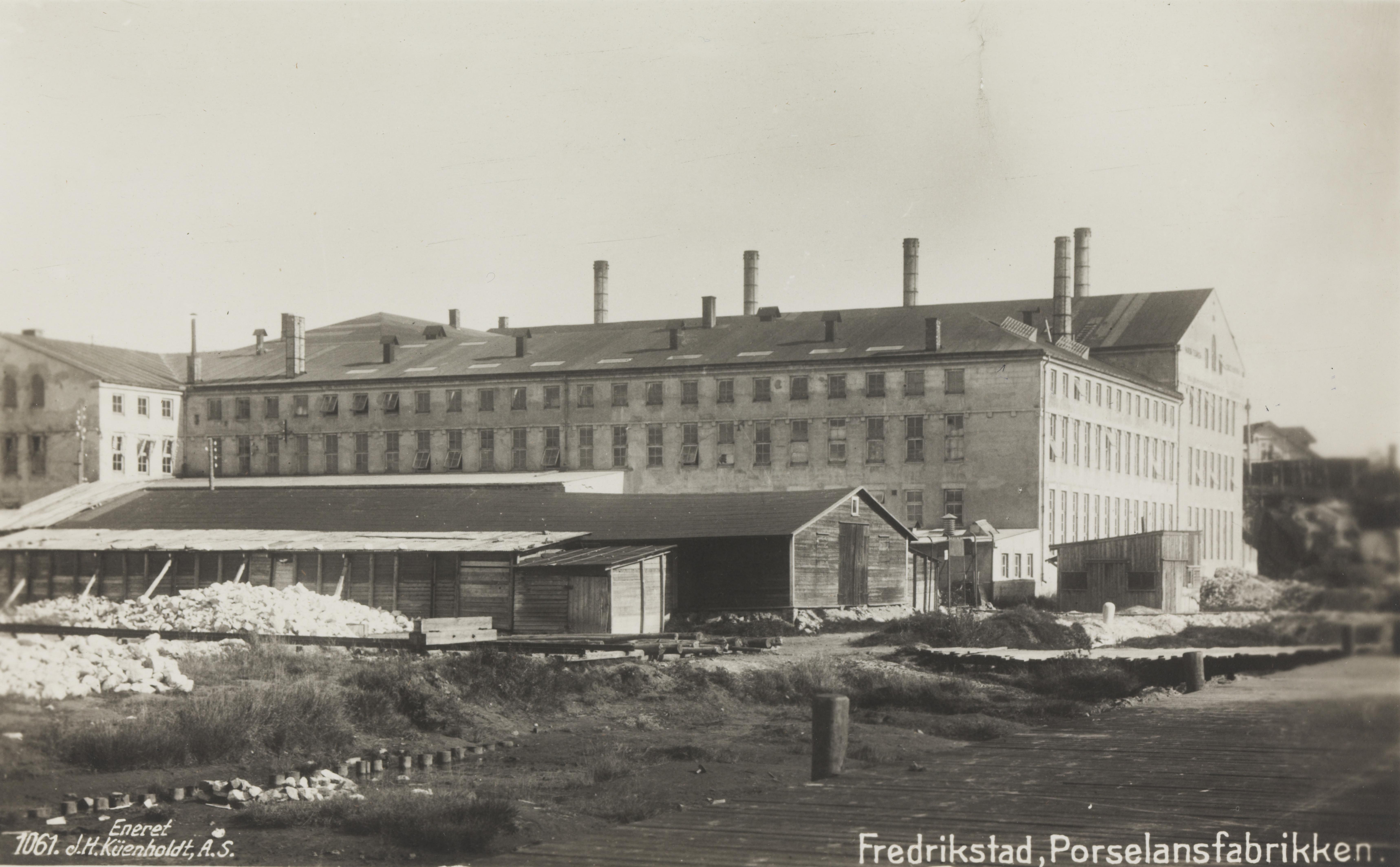
Norwegian Technical Porcelain in Fredrikstad on a postcard from approximately 1920-1940

Norsk Teknisk Porselen AS (NTP) is a Norwegian manufacturer of ceramic and composite insulators based in Fredrikstad. NTP mostly produces ceramic insulators for electrostatic precipitators, with sales worldwide. Founded in 1916, the first plastic product produced in Norway was an electrical outlet in bakelite produced by Norsk Teknisk Porselen.
