= Anthony Coucheron =

- Born: c. 1650 probably Holland
- Died: 1689
- Allegiance: Denmark–Norway
- Rank: Quartermaster General
- Commands: Christiansø Fortress

Anthony Coucheron (also recorded as Anton Coucheron or Anthony Willemsen; c.1650 – 14 March 1689) was an engineering officer. Coucheron played an important role in the history of Norwegian and Danish fortifications. As Sweden grew to be a great power in the 17th century, there were frequent wars in the Baltic region, and conflict was common along the borders between Sweden and Denmark-Norway. Easy invasions routes from Sweden were fortified on the Danish-Norwegian border with new or upgraded fortresses during this period, effectively establishing the modern borders between Norway and Sweden. Coucheron played a major role in fortification of the border, both in Norway and Denmark; in addition, he fought with honor in the Gyldenløve War.

== Career ==
=== Early career ===
Coucheron was born about 1650 (probably in Holland).

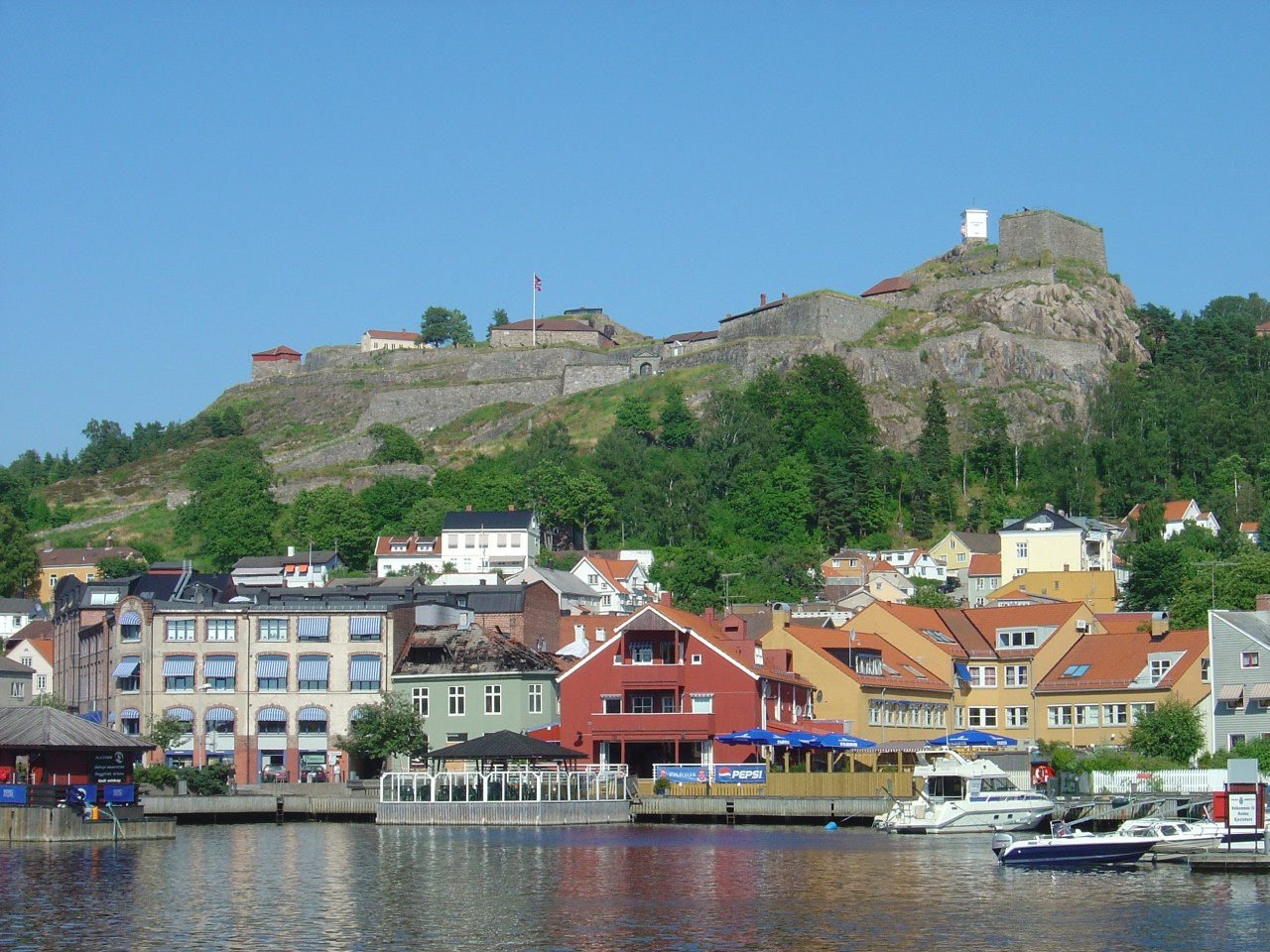
Coucheron was a construction supervisor at Fredriksten fortress

Coucheron worked as construction supervisor in Fredrikstad in 1665 and was assistant to his father 1666. His father was the Dutch-born Danish-Norwegian Quartermaster General Willem Coucheron, who began the construction of the fortifications at Fredrikstad in 1663. Together they worked on the fortification which became known as Fredriksten fortress in Halden.

In 1673 Anthony Coucheron was sent as lieutenant (in Norwegian løytnant) to Kongsvinger Fortress in Elverum to prepare plans for expansion of the existing fortification. Coucheron was then promoted to lieutenant commander (in Norwegian kapteinløytnant) at Akershus in 1674, and in the same year he was promoted to captain.

=== Gyldenløve War ===
During the Gyldenløve War (1675–1679) he served from 1675 to 1676 as captain of the governor general's dragoons. He was then assigned to Denmark, where he served as quartermaster general in charge of military engineering from 1 May 1676. He served in his father's regiment as captain, from 1677 until the regiment was disbanded in 1679, participating in fighting in Bohuslän, participating in the capture of Karlsten Fortress in Marstrand in July 1677 and was a member of the Danish-Norwegian force led by Norway's Governor General Ulrik Fredrik Gyldenløve in the Danish-Norwegian victory over Sweden at the Battle of Uddevalla in 1679.

=== Service after the Gyldenløve War ===
After the war he was promoted rapidly (following in the footsteps of his father) and became quartermaster general in Norway from 1680 to 1684. He was also named commandant and colonel at the Danish Christiansø fortress located on Ertholmene in 1681.

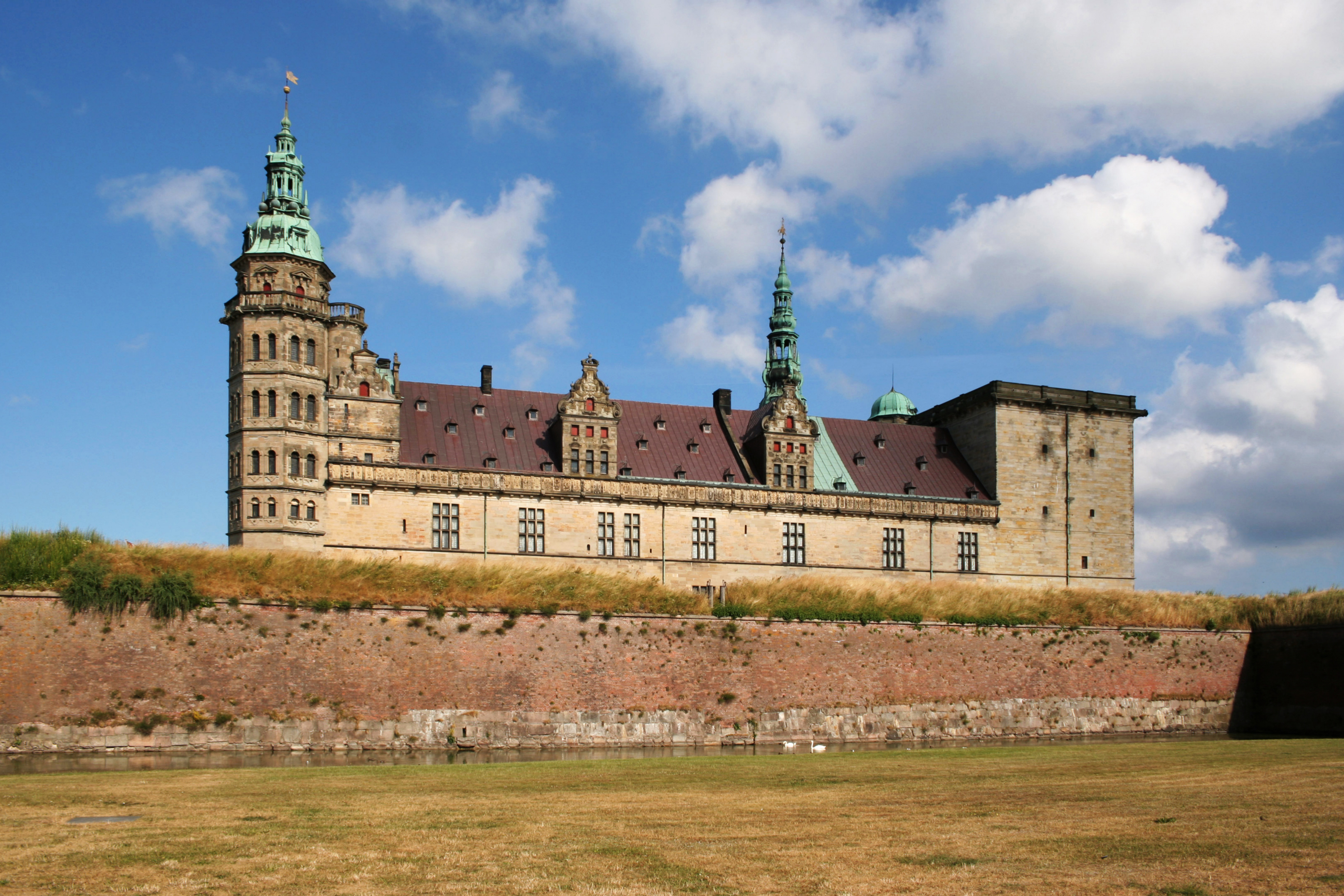
Kronborg Fortress is an UNESCO World Heritage Site

The city of Trondheim was destroyed by a fire in April 1681. Danish-Norwegian King Christian V directed Major General Johan Caspar von Cicignon and Quartermaster General Coucheron to develop plans for reconstruction of the city, which were to include a new fortifications. The resulting design included exterior fortifications, streets optimized to relocate military forces in defense, and a stronghold—Kristiansten Fortress. Construction of Kristiansten Fortress was completed in 1684. In addition to working on the city reconstruction and fortifications at Trondheim, Kongsvinger and Elverum, he also worked on the remodeling of Akershus Fortress and plans for fortifying Fredrikstad.

Coucheron began work on the fortification of Danish Christiansø fortress located on Ertholmene an island east of Bornholm, (begun in 1684) and Fladstrand in Fredrikshavn in 1687). Together with the commandant Jacob Geveke he undertook the fortification of Kronborg (1686–1688); after their work was completed Kronborg was considered the strongest fortress of the period in Europe.

In 1687 he was installed as commandant at Akershus Fortress, where he died on 14 March 1689.

== Family ==
He was the son of Willem Coucheron and Maria Fessers. He married a Dutch-born woman, Magdalena Alendolphia van Langen, who survived him.

== Other sources ==
- Holden, Helge. "Anthony Coucheron's map of Trondheim (from the end of the 17th century)".
- V.E. Tychsen: Fortifikations-Etaterne og Ingeniørkorpset, 1884
- Chr. Elling: Holmens Bygningshistorie, 1932
- Norske Minnesmerker, Fredrikstad, 1934
- J. Klindt Jensen: Barokken i Rønne Fæstning, 1952
- H. Langberg: Danmarks Bygningskultur I, 1955
- V. Steen Møller: Frederiksvern, 1973
- H.E. Nørregård-Nielsen i: Magtens Bolig (Danm. Ark.), 1980
- Norsk Kunstnerleksikon, Oslo 1981
- Kjeld Magnussen: Foren. til norske Fortidsminners Bevaring, Årsbok 1985
- P. Bolten Jagd: Danske Forsvarsanlæg I, 1986
- Huse i Fr.havn, 1986
