= Fredrikstad Bridge =

Bridge in Norway

Coordinates: 59°12′36″N 10°57′37″E

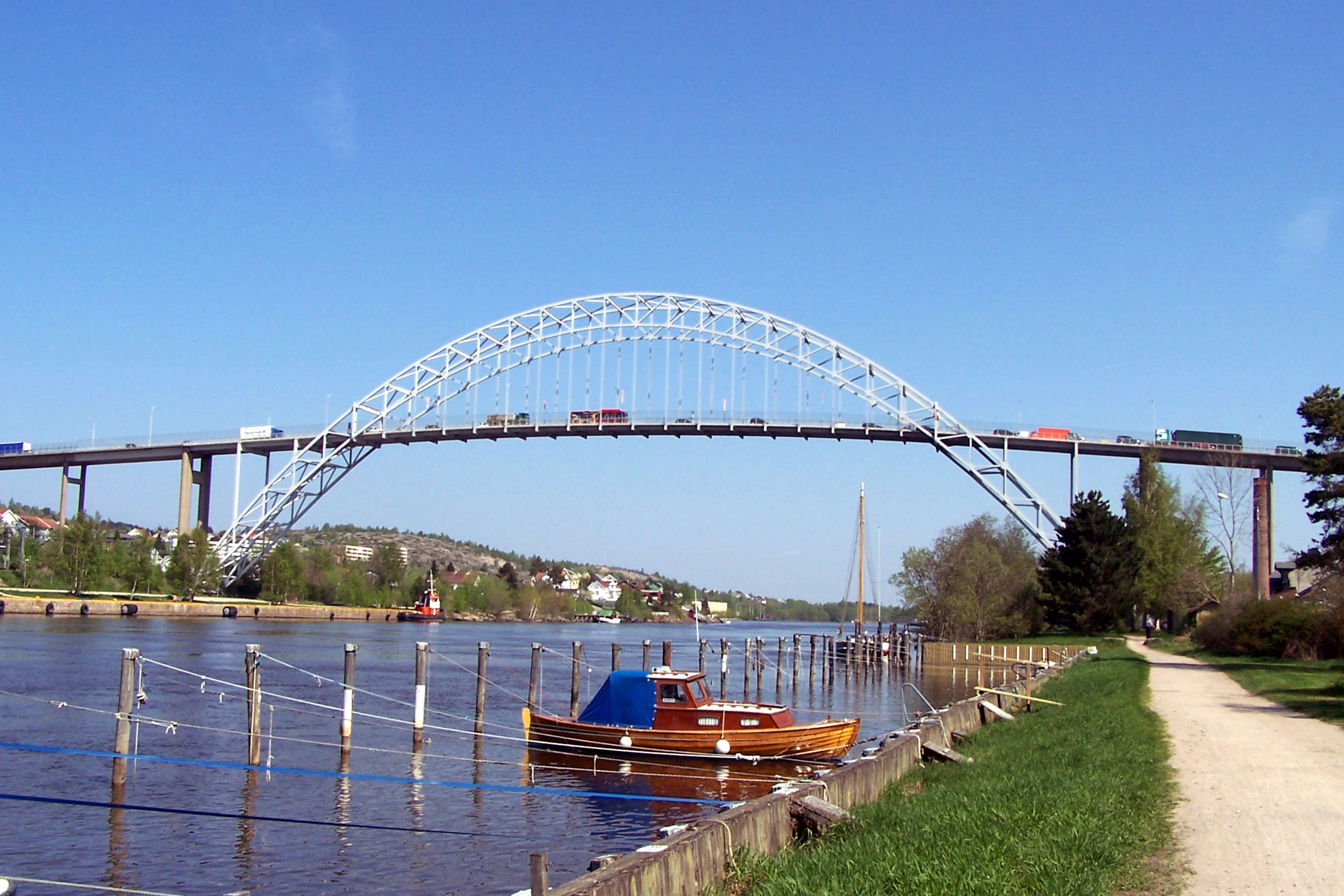

The Fredrikstad Bridge is an arch bridge in the city of Fredrikstad in Østfold county, Norway. It crosses the river Glomma, and connects the western and eastern parts of the city. The bridge is 824 m (2,703 ft) long, with a main span of 196 m (643 ft). The sailing height is 39.5 m (130 ft). The bridge was opened 18 August 1957, by the then crown prince Olav. It is a slightly larger copy of the two-year older Karmsund bridge. The bridge is protected as a national heritage structure.
