= Battle of Nyborg fjord =

Swedish attack on a Danish squadron

- Part of the Dano-Swedish War (1657–1658)
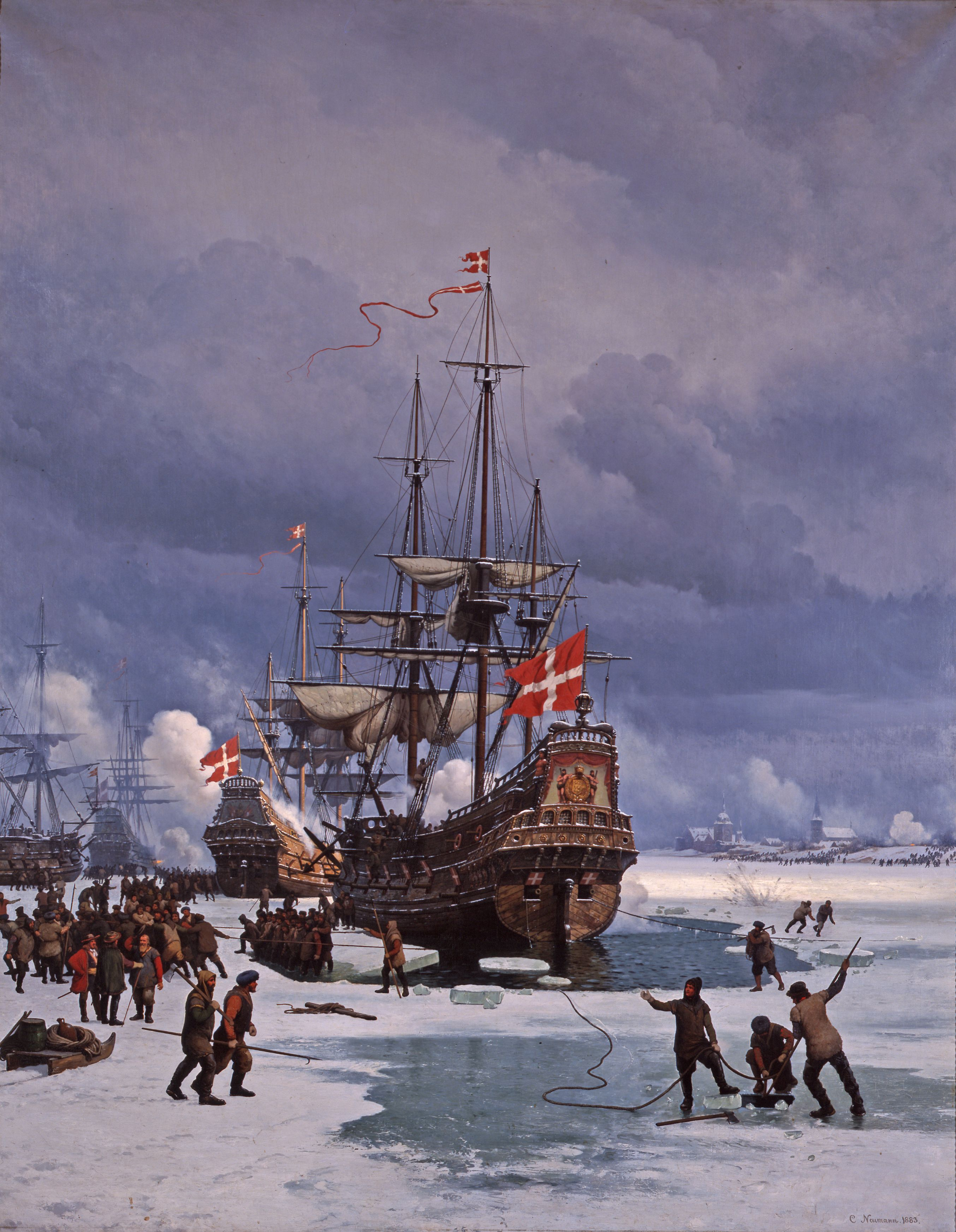
- Peter Bredal takes his ships out of the ice at Nyborg, by Carl Neumann
Date	10–12 February, 1658
Location	Nyborg
Result	Danish victory

Belligerents
(yes) Swedish Empire	Denmark–Norway

Commanders and leaders
(Swedish Empire) Carl Gustaf Wrangel	(Denmark–Norway) Peter Bredal

Units involved
Unknown	(Denmark–Norway) Peter Bredal's Little Belt squadron

Strength
Unknown	4 ships

Casualties and losses
Unknown	Unknown

The battle of Nyborg fjord (Swedish: Slaget vid Nyborg fjord; Danish: Slaget ved Nyborg fjord) was an unsuccessful Swedish attack led by Carl Gustaf Wrangel on a Danish squadron trapped in Nyborg during the Dano-Swedish War of 1657–1658

== Background ==
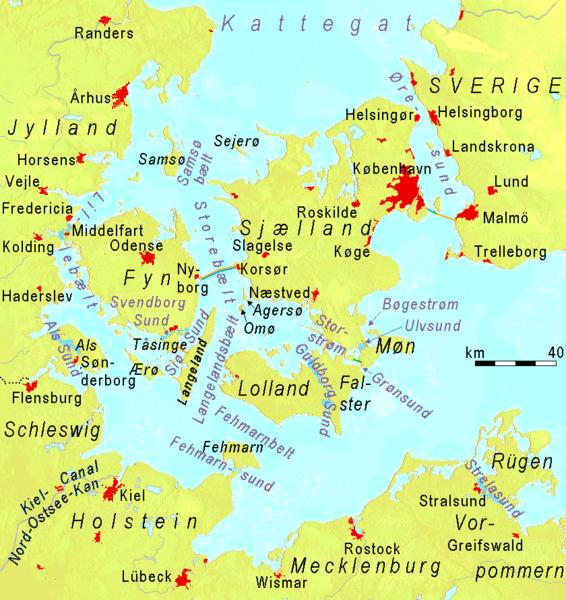
Map of the Little and Great belts, along with the Sound

On the day after crossing the Little Belt, Charles X Gustav entered Odense, which was the main town on Fyn. He was determined to lead the Swedish army across the Great Belt, over from Fyn to Zealand and then Copenhagen. He had two choices, the shortest route but also the riskiest was the direct route from Nyborg to Korsør, which was about 18 kilometers long. A longer but safer route was the route going from Svendborg to Vordingborg on Zealand. In order to keep his options open, Charles sent Carl Gustaf Wrangel with half of the army to Nyborg and Fabian Berendes with the other half towards Svendborg.

== Battle ==
When they arrived at Nyborg, Wrangel and his men found several hundred abandoned Danish cavalry horses, as the cavalrymen had fled over to Zealand, and believed it would be safer to cross on foot. Then, Wrangel encountered Peter Bredal's Little Belt squadron, stuck in the ice in the Nyborg roadstead. Even though he was unable to move, Bredal refused to surrender. He had four warships at his disposal, the Svenske Løve, Samson, Lammet, and Emanuel. Frederick III had ordered Bredal to destroy the ships rather than surrender them.

Seeing this, Wrangel brought out regimental cannons in order to lay siege to the squadron. However, Bredal had a lot of artillery on the ships and thus outgunned the Swedes. Then, Wrangel sent cavalry across the ice in an attack on the ships, but since Bredal had grapeshot ammunition, the cavalry charge quickly became suicidal.

During the siege, Bredal's men worked tirelessly to cut the ice open in order to move the ships further out into open water or at least out of range from the Swedish artillery. After the failed cavalry charge, Wrangel instead sent infantry out onto the ice, which began attempting to build siege works; however, it was difficult to stay there exposed to the cold winds, and the Danish artillery fire made the Swedish conditions unbearable.

However, the situation was also not good for Bredal, as all of the crew members soon realized that if the winds reached gale-force, which seemed likely, they would be crushed against the ice. Erik Dahlbergh described the siege as "that one never before had seen or heard of".

== Aftermath ==
After some time, Wrangel had other more urgent activities to move on to, meanwhile Bredal stayed put, refusing to surrender. Eventually, Bredal's squadron managed to break out of the ice, and soon came out of range from the Swedish artillery.

== Works cited ==
- Essen, Michael Fredholm von (2023). Charles X's Wars: Volume 3 - The Danish Wars, 1657-1660. Helion & Company. ISBN 9781915113603.
- Isacson, Claes-Göran (2015). Karl X Gustavs krig: Fälttågen i Polen, Tyskland, Baltikum, Danmark och Sverige 1655-1660 [Wars of Charles X Gustav: The campaigns in Poland, Germany, the Baltics, Denmark and Sweden 1655-1660] (in Swedish). Historiska Media. ISBN 9789175450117.
- Askgaard, Finn (1974). Stade, Arne (ed.). Kampen om Östersjön på Carl X Gustafs tid: ett bidrag till nordisk sjörigshistoria [The struggle for the Baltic Sea in the time of Carl X Gustaf: a contribution to Nordic maritime history] (in Danish). Militärhistoriska förlaget.
