= Louise Kathrine Dedichen =

Norwegian vice-admiral

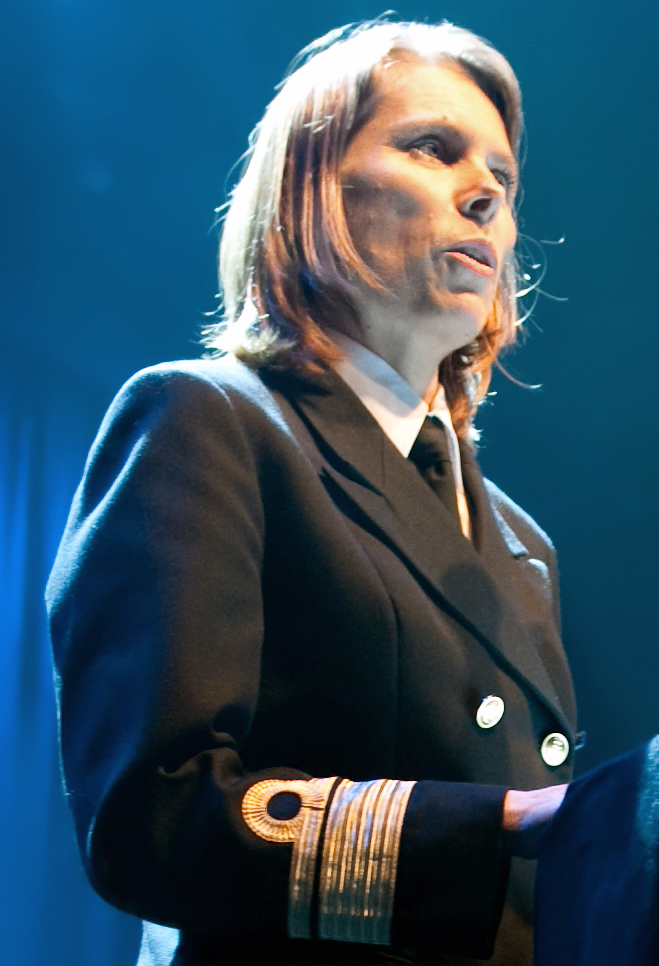
Louise Kathrine Dedichen

Louise Kathrine Dedichen (born 1964) is a Norwegian vice-admiral who in June 2019 was appointed head of Norway's military mission in Brussels, becoming Norway's representative on the NATO Military Committee. She is the first woman to serve on the committee. From 2008, she headed the Norwegian Defence University College.

== Early life and education ==
Born in 1964 in Fredrikstad in south-eastern Norway, Dedichen completed her school education in Christianslund in 1982. She then attended Norway's Naval College (1983–1987). She later spent a year at the College interarmées de defense in Paris (2002–2003) and studied culture and conflict at the University of Oslo (2005), completing her education at the Norwegian Defence University College in Oslo (2006).

== Career ==
She first served as quartermaster on KNM Stavanger and KNM Trondheim (1987–1989). She then served on the Naval Supply Command before serving as deputy head of Norway's military mission in Brussels (1995–1998). Dedichen then joined the Armed Forces Command as press assistant and project coordinator (1998–2000). From 2003, she took up an appointment at the Defence University College, first as head teacher in economics, then as head of department for logistics, management and method. In 2008, as a rear admiral, she served as head of the Defence College.

Her appointment as head of the Norwegian Defense University College was challenged by another of the candidates, Brigadier Øyvind Kirsebom Strandman, who alleged that Dedichen had been appointed because she was a woman. The case went to the Norwegian Supreme Court who ruled by four to one in 2014 that she had been appointed not because she was a woman but because she was the most qualified applicant.

In June 2019, she was appointed head of Norway's military mission in Brussels, becoming the first woman to serve on the NATO Military Committee.
