= Willem Coucheron =

- Born: Holland
- Died: 1689
- Allegiance: Denmark-Norway
- Rank: colonel
- Commands: captain of the Valdres company colonel of the Coucheron regiment, commandant of Marstrand commandant at Bergenhus fortress

Willem Coucheron (also recorded as Willum or Wyllem Coucheron) was a Dutch-born Danish-Norwegian quartermaster general.

== Biography ==
Willem Coucheron was born in the Netherlands and came to Norway in June 1657. Coucheron came to Norway as an engineer and quartermaster general for the region south of the Dovrefjell mountain range in central Norway in June 1657. He served as captain of the Oplandske National Infantry Regiment in 1658 and captain of the Valdres company Under the command of Jørgen Bjelke he led his company in combat at Bohuslän in 1659, and in the defense of Halden from 14 January to 23 February 1660.

In 1660, he was sent to Copenhagen to present plans for a new defensive work for Halden, Norway. These plans were approved by the king on 28 July 1660. He began the construction of the fortifications of Fredrikstad Fortress at Halden in 1663. Together with his son Anthony Coucheron, he worked on the fortification which became known as Fredriksten fortress in Halden. The defensive walls, built to the Dutch design of the period, were so effective a deterrent that the town, although placed under siege, was never taken. He became colonel of the Coucheron regiment in 1676; During the Gyldenløve War the regiment participated in combat at Bohuslän and performed well in the conquest of Carlsten fortress (Swedish: Karlstens fästning) at Marstrand in 1677. He became commandant of Marstrand 1677–79 and commandant at Bergenhus fortress from 1680. Coucheron died at Bergenhus 20 June 1689.

== Other soueces ==
- V.E. Tychsen: Fortifikations-Etaterne og Ingeniørkorpset, 1884
- Chr. Elling: Holmens Bygningshistorie, 1932
- Norske Minnesmerker, Fredrikstad, 1934
- J. Klindt Jensen: Barokken i Rønne Fæstning, 1952
- H. Langberg: Danmarks Bygningskultur I, 1955
- V. Steen Møller: Frederiksvern, 1973
- H.E. Nørregård-Nielsen i: Magtens Bolig (Danm. Ark.), 1980
- Norsk Kunstnerleksikon, Oslo 1981
- Kjeld Magnussen: Foren. til norske Fortidsminners Bevaring, Årsbok 1985
- P. Bolten Jagd: Danske Forsvarsanlæg I, 1986
- Huse i Fr.havn, 1986
