= Alfred Næss (playwright) =

Norwegian playwright

- Born: 30 November 1927; Vardø, Norway
- Died: 30 November 1997 (aged 70); Oslo
- Occupations: Playwtight, songwriter

Alfred Næss (30 November 1927 – 30 November 1997) was a Norwegian playwright and songwriter for revue stages in Oslo, in particular for Chat Noir and the ABC theatre. He wrote material for artists like Wenche Myhre and Dizzie Tunes and contributed to television comedies.

== Personal life ==
Næss was born in Vardø Municipality, Finnmark county, Norway as the son of physician Aage Næss and Elna Elisabeth Eide. He was married to Anne Marie Dahl from 1953 to 1955, and to Marie Elisabeth Grønn-Nielsen from 1960 until her death in 1978. He was then married to Eivor Hilde Midthus since 1995. He died in Oslo in 1997, on his 70th birthday.

== Career ==
After the forced evacuation and destruction of Finnmark in 1944/1945, Næss moved to Oslo and graduated from Oslo Cathedral School in 1947. While studying jurisprudence in Oslo, he started writing student revues. His professional debut was the revue Ferske fjes from 1957, in cooperation with Einar Schanke, staged on Chat Noir. From 1959 to 1975 he worked for Chat Noir, and from 1976 to 1992 for the ABC theatre. He was the main writer for the show group Dizzie Tunes, in cooperation with the group's leader Yngvar Numme. He delivered material to Wenche Myhre's show I all Wenchelhet from 1979, and Øivind Blunck Hege Schøyen's shows Bare gode venner and Fast følge. He wrote songs for the 1965 film Stompa forelsker seg, and for the 1966 film Hurra for Andersens.

Among his best-known songs are På Enerhaugen from 1960 (performed by Arvid Nilssen) and Vinter og sne from 1966 (performed by Wenche Myhre).

He was awarded the Leonard Statuette in 1981, and received the King's Medal of Merit in gold in 1997.
