= Arne Svendsen =

Norwegian songwriter

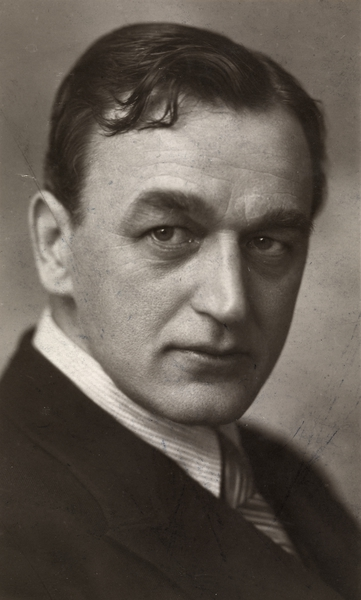
- Arne Svendsen, c. 1935
- Born: 11 December 1884; Fosnes Municipality, Norway
- Died: 20 November 1958 (aged 73); Oslo
- Occupations: Songwriter, actor and revue writer

Arne Svendsen (11 December 1884 – 20 November 1958) was a Norwegian songwriter, actor and revue writer.

== Career ==
Svendsen was born in Fosnes Municipality in Nord-Trøndelag, Norway. In 1910, he left home and settled in Fredrikstad Municipality, where he first worked as a hairdresser and barber. In 1911, he wrote his first revue for the Fredrikstad Arbeiderforening, followed by five new revues annually until 1920. From 1921, Svendsen was associated with Chat Noir, a cabaret and revue theatre in Oslo. He wrote the revue, Midt i planeten together with Per Kvist in 1922. He also collaborated with songwriter Finn Bo (1927–36). From 1937 he worked with teams of various revue writers including Bias Bernhoft, Arild Feldborg and Erik Diesen. They wrote music for revues which appeared at Det Nye Teater, Carl Johan Theater, and Edderkoppen Theatre, and with more irregular intervals for Chat Noir. He was for many years chairman of the Norwegian Comedy Writers' Association. Svendsen wrote more than 2,500 songs during his career, in addition to more than one hundred revues. Among his notable songs were Svigermor og Evensen og kjerringa og jeg (1927), first performed by Einar Rose, En liten gylden ring (1936), sung by Jens Book Jensen, and E'hel ei, e'halv ei (1955), introduced by Lalla Carlsen in the Chat Noir revue Kjør Storgata.

== Personal life ==
Svendsen was married at age 19 to Jenny Claudine Andersen (1876–1953). That marriage was dissolved in 1933 and he married Lilly Margrethe Andersen (1902–1996). He was the father of composer and kapellmeister Kolbjørn Svendsen (1903–1967), and singer and theatre director Herbert Herding (1904–1958).

He died in Oslo on 20 November 1958.

== Filmography ==
- Til sæters (1924)
- Simen Mustrøens besynderlige opplevelser (1926)
- Syv dage for Elisabeth (1927)
- Op med hodet! (1934)
