= Arild Feldborg =

Norwegian playwright, revue writer, script writer, humorist and broadcasting person

Arild Feldborg (18 April 1912 – 26 October 1987) was a Norwegian playwright, revue writer, script writer, humorist and broadcasting person.

== Personal life ==
Feldborg was born in Vienna, Austria-Hungary, as the son of wholesaler Henry Theobald Feldborg and Petra Normandine Schnitler Blehr, and grew up in Norway. He was married to headmaster and secretary Aase Refsdal from 1948. He died in Bærum in 1987.

== Career ==
Feldborg graduated as cand.oecon. in 1934. He wrote for revue theatres from the late 1920s, and his breakthrough came in 1934 with the song "Å" (co-written with Bias Bernhoft), in the Chat Noir revue Det hendte i går. Among his songs from the 1930s are "Norge, våkn opp!" from 1934 (English: Norway, Wake Up!, performed by Lalla Carlsen) and "Penere og penere" (English: Nicer and nicer, performed by Einar Rose in 1936, on Mussolini's attack on Ethiopia). His song "Bursda'n min" (English: My Birthday, performed by Einar Rose acting as a short man with moustache), was stopped by the police after strong protests from the German Minister in Norway. During the occupation of Norway by Nazi Germany from 1940 to 1945 he took part in the resistance in various ways. While in exile in Sweden he wrote songs for the Norwegian police troops in Sweden. His song Norge i rødt, hvitt og blått", co-written with Finn Bø, was met with wild enthusiasm when it was introduced by Lalla Carlsen in May 1945.

He also collaborated with other songwriters such as Arild Haga, Otto Nielsen and Alfred Næss. Among his post-war songs are "Vigelandvise" (performed by Einar Rose), "Måten da ser De" (for Kari Diesen), and "Swingdilla" (for Leif Juster). Rolf Just Nilsen had his artistical breakthrough in 1958 with Feldborg's song "Operasangeren".

He worked for the Norwegian Broadcasting Corporation from 1947, first within the radio's entertainment department, and later at Radioteatret. He also wrote for television. Among his works are a book on bridge, Bridge med Arild Feldborg from 1965, the crime novel Malkesaken (co-written with Michael Grundt Spang) and a book on solving crosswords, Damms kryssordløser from 1982. He edited the anthology Humor i Norge (English: Humor in Norway) from 1974. His comedy Mannfolk was performed at Oslo Nye Teater in 1980. He wrote the television opera Sjakk from 1980, and the musical Balder from 1984. He was awarded the Leonard Statuette in 1980.
