= Leonard Statuette =

Norwegian entertainment award

Leonardstatuetten (Leonard Statuette) is a prize awarded by the Norwegian Comedy Writers' Association. The award is named after revue instructor, composer and director Einar Leonard Schanke (1927–1992), who was one of Norway's most important revue personalities. The prize is regarded the highest distinction in Norwegian revue. Awarded from 1968 to 2013, the statuette was given to persons with a significant and lasting importance to Norway's entertainment industry. The statuette was again awarded in 2019, when Eldar Vågan was the recipient.

== Prize winners ==
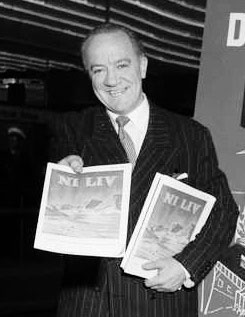
Arvid Nilssen, first recipient of the Leonard Statuette

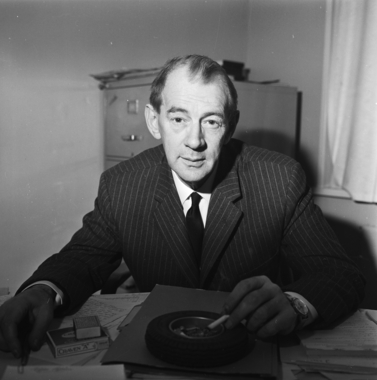
Otto Nielsen, winner 1979

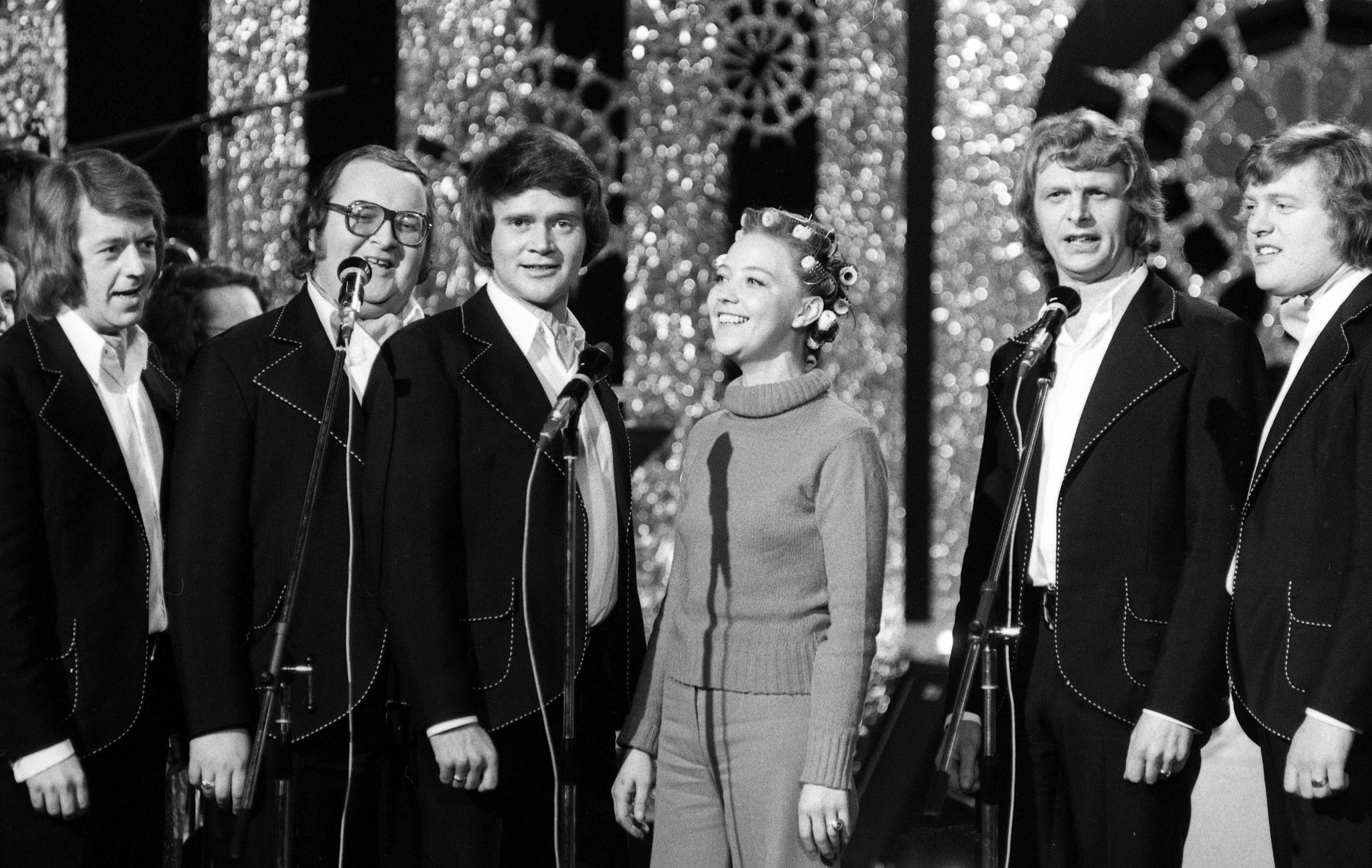
The Dizzie Tunes (1993 recipients) with Grethe Kausland (1991 recipient)

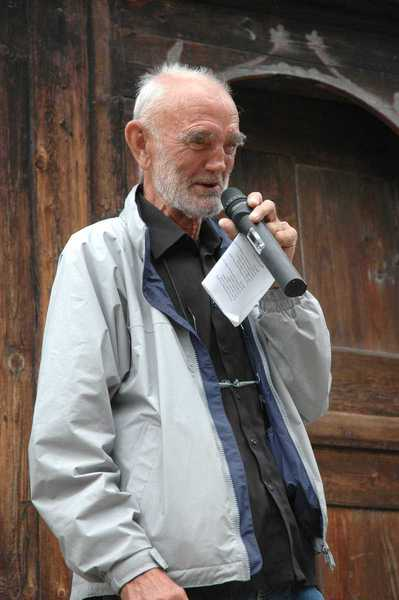
Odd Børretzen, winner 2002

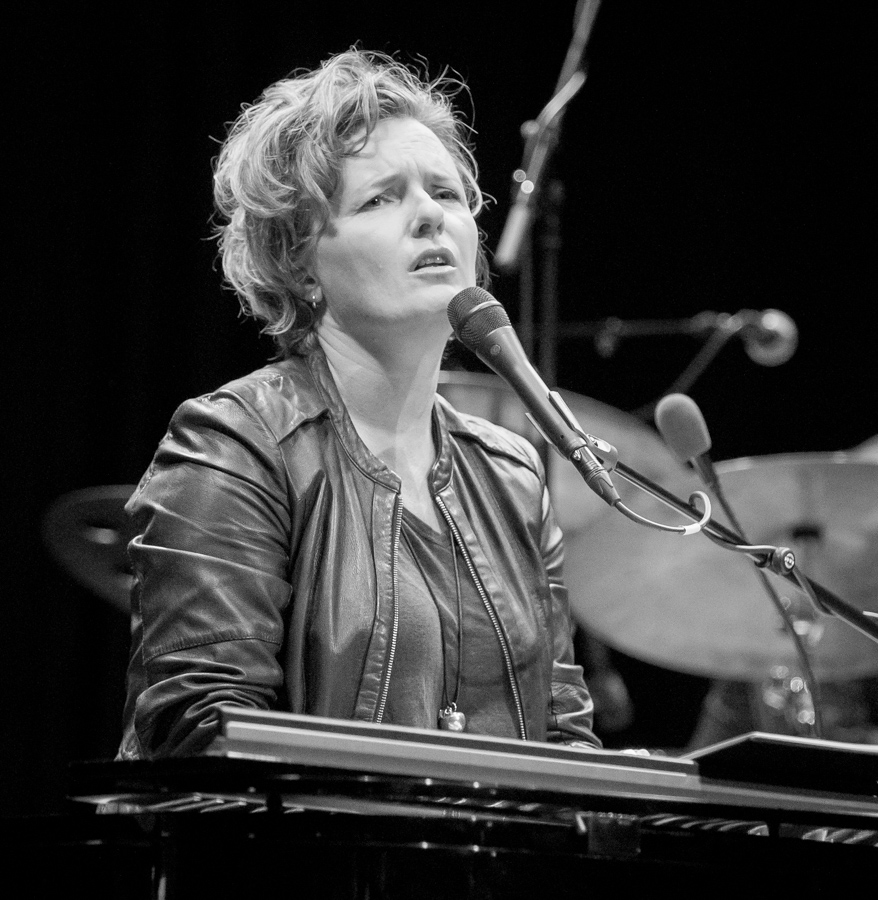
Ingrid Bjørnov, won the prize in 2013

This is a list of prize winners:

- 1968 – Arvid Nilssen, actor
- 1969 – Leif Juster, actor
- 1970 – not awarded
- 1971 – Kari Diesen, actress
- 1972 – Arve Opsahl, actor
- 1973 – Bias Bernhoft, revue writer
- 1974 – Jens Book-Jenssen, actor
- 1975 – Carsten Byhring, actor
- 1976 – Rolf Just Nilsen, actor
- 1977 – Einar Schanke, instructor and composer
- 1978 – Rolv Wesenlund, actor
- 1979 – Otto Nielsen, revue writer
- 1980 – Arild Feldborg, revue writer
- 1981 – Alfred Næss, revue writer
- 1982 – Knut Solberg, scenographer
- 1983 – Elsa Lystad, actress
- 1984 – Harald Heide-Steen Jr., actor
- 1985 – Arild Haga, revue writer
- 1986 – Elisabeth Granneman, actress
- 1987 – Sølvi Wang, actress
- 1988 – not awarded
- 1989 – not awarded
- 1990 – Yngvar Numme, actor
- 1991 – Grethe Kausland, actress
- 1992 – not awarded
- 1993 – Dizzie Tunes: Tor Erik Gunstrøm, Svein-Helge Høgberg, Einar Idland, Øyvind Klingberg, Yngvar Numme, actors
- 1994 – Bjørn Sand, revue writer
- 1995 – Erik Diesen, revue writer
- 1996 – not awarded
- 1997 – Øystein Sunde, artist/composer/text writer
- 1998 – Hege Schøyen and Øivind Blunck, actors
- 1999 – Arthur Arntzen, humorist and satirist
- 2000 – Dag Frøland, actor
- 2001 – KLM (Trond Kirkvaag, Knut Lystad, Lars Mjøen, actors)
- 2002 – Odd Børretzen, humorist and satirist
- 2003 – Brit Elisabeth Haagensli, actor
- 2004 – not awarded
- 2005 – Andreas Diesen, revue historian
- 2006 - not awarded
- 2007 - Jon Skolmen, actor
- 2008 - Jakob Margido Esp, actor and humorist
- 2009 – not awarded
- 2010 – Rune Gokstad and Øystein Bache
- 2011 – not awarded
- 2012 – Linn Skåber
- 2013 – Ingrid Bjørnov
- 2014 – Ole Paus
- 2015 – Knut Nærum (utdelt 2023)
- 2016 – Anne Marit Jacobsen
- 2017 – Tore Ryen
- 2018 – Nils Vogt
- 2019 – Eldar Vågan
- 2020 – Tom Sterri
- 2021 – Atle Antonsen
- 2022 – Trond Hanssen
- 2023 – Anne-Kat. Hærland
- 2024 – Tom Mathisen & Herodes Falsk
