= Elsa Lystad =

Norwegian actress (1930–2023)

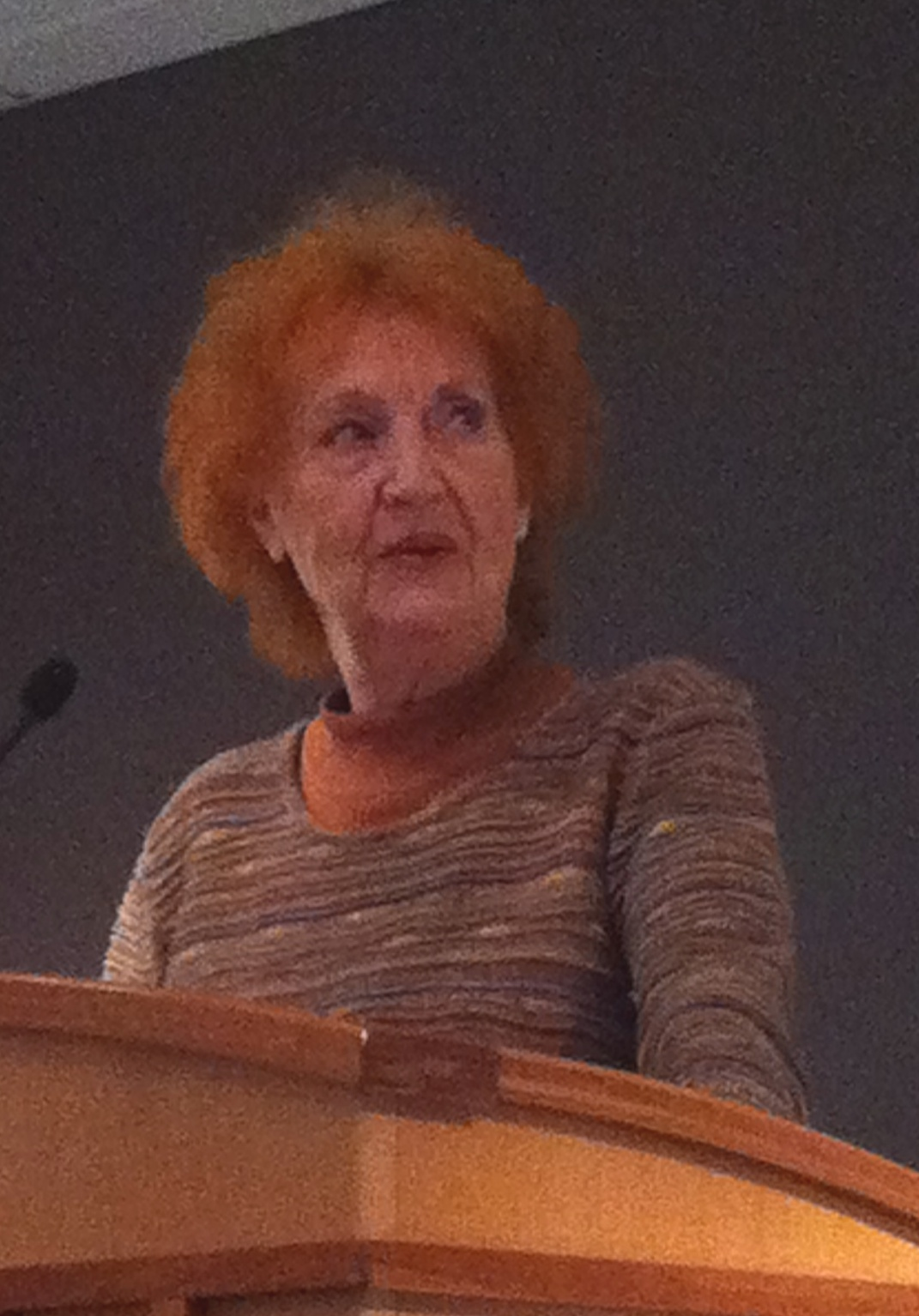
- Lystad in 2011
- Born: 9 July 1930; Oslo, Norway
- Died: 26 December 2023 (aged 93)
- Occupation: Actress
- Awards: Leonard Statuette (1983); King's Medal of Merit (2007); Amanda Honorary Award (2014); Gullruten (2014)

Elsa Lystad (9 July 1930 – 26 December 2023) was a Norwegian film and stage actress. She was a recipient of the Leonard Statuette, the King's Medal of Merit, the Amanda Honorary Award, and Gullruten.

== Career ==
Lystad made her stage debut in 1956, and her breakthrough as actress came in the mid-1960s. She has since been a central actress in Norwegian film, theatre, television and radio.

Lystad was assigned to Det Norske Teatret from 1958 to 1964, and thereafter Chat Noir, Fjernsynsteatret, Oslo Nye Teater, and Den Nationale Scene until 1980. As freelancer she has later played for the theatres Nationaltheatret, Riksteatret, Chat Noir, ABC-teatret and Hålogaland Teater, as well as revue assignments.

Her breakthrough came in 1965 at the revue theatre Lysthuset in Oslo, where she played in collaboration with Rolv Wesenlund and Harald Heide-Steen Jr. She was subsequently engaged with Einar Schanke at Chat Noir, and played with Wesenlund in the film Hurra for Andersens! (1966).

Lystad was awarded the Leonard Statuette in 1983. In 2007 she received the King's Medal of Merit in gold. She received the Amanda Honorary Award for 2014. In 2014 she also won the Gullruten award for best actress, for her role in Etter karnevalet.

== Personal life and death ==
Born in Oslo on 9 July 1930, Lystad was a daughter of Erling Magnus Lystad and Thora Aamot. She married Arpad Robert Istvan Szemes (1930–1998) in 1965. They had three children. After marrying, Lystad also converted to Roman Catholicism.

Lystad died on 26 December 2023, at the age of 93.

== Selected filmography ==
- 1966: Hurra for Andersens!
- 1968: De ukjentes marked
- 1968: Smuglere
- 1980: Belønningen
- 1988: Sweetwater

== Selected works ==
- Hva er det med meg (autobiography, 1986)
