= Arild Haga =

Norwegian writer (1913–1985)

Arild Haga (8 April 1913 – 22 February 1985) was a Norwegian revue writer.

He was born in 1913. He wrote revues for the stages Chat Noir, Scala and Edderkoppen, and also composed revue music. Among his songs were "Byen med det store hjertet", "Kioskdamen", "Annen Violin" and "Vi e'kje nokke, vi". He chaired the Norwegian Comedy Writers' Association for 20 years, and received their honorary Leonard Statuette in 1985. He also worked as a school teacher in Oslo and Arendal, and held posts in the Norwegian Society of Composers and Lyricists and TONO. He died in 1985.
