= Op med hodet! =

- Directed by: Tancred Ibsen
- Written by: Tancred Ibsen
- Produced by: Erling Bergendahl
- Starring: Lillebil Ibsen; Tore Foss; Julie Lampe; Egil Hjorth-Jenssen; Leif Amble-Næss; David Knudsen; Gogo Mowinckel-Nilsen; Sverre Arnesen; Carsten Carlsen; Lalla Carlsen; Leif Enger; Herbert Herding-Herberth; Leif Juster; Olaf Kronstad; Per Kvist; Ella Peaters; Einar Vaage
- Cinematography: Harald Berglund
- Edited by: Tancred Ibsen
- Music by: Kristian Hauger
- Distributed by: Specialfilms AS
- Release date: January 22, 1934
- Running time: 86 minutes
- Country: Norway
- Language: Norwegian

Op med hodet! (literally, Up with Your Head!, or Cheer Up!) is a Norwegian comedy film from 1934. It was directed by Tancred Ibsen and produced by Erling Bergendahl. The actors appearing in the film include Lillebil Ibsen, Lalla Carlsen, and Leif Juster. The film was very experimental for its time, and it included special effects, multiple exposures, reverse motion, and color sequences.

The title of the film is a reference to the opening line of a poem in Bjørnstjerne Bjørnson's novel En glad Gut (A Happy Boy): "Løft ditt hode, du raske gutt!" (Lift your head, you restless youth!), spoken by a Bjørnson statue in the film.

== Cast ==
- Lillebil Ibsen as Lill, a ballet dancer
- Tore Foss as Theobald Tordenstam
- Julie Lampe as Theobald's mother
- Egil Hjorth-Jenssen as the theater manager
- Leif Amble-Næss as a ballet instructor
- David Knudsen as the bartender
- August Mowinckel-Nilsen as the theater director
- Sverre Arnesen as a stage worker
- Carsten Carlsen as the music director
- Lalla Carlsen as an actress
- Leif Enger as a scriptwriter
- Herbert Herding as an actor
- Leif Juster as an actor
- Olaf Kronstad as an actor
- Per Kvist as an actor
- Ella Peaters as Gerda, a dancer and singer
- Eugen Skjønberg (not credited)
- Einar Vaage as an audience member
- Finn Bø as himself
- Arne Svendsen as himself
- Kristian Hauger as a pianist
