= Ola var fra Sandefjord =

Norwegian song

Single by Einar Rose
- Released: 1929
- Recorded: 1929
- Genre: Foxtrot (original version), Schlager music (1965 cover)
- Length: 2:38
- Label: Odeon Records
- Composer: Albert Edvin Pedersen
- Lyricist: Per Kvist

Ola var fra Sandefjord (“Ola Was from Sandefjord”) is a 1929 Norwegian song by Einar Rose. It was originally named "My Little Sweetheart". It was one of the most popular songs in Norway in the 1930s. It was composed by Albert Edvin Pedersen and written by Per Kvist.

The Johnny Band revived the 30-year old classic in 1965 and it became one of Norway's best-selling singles. It was awarded Norway's silver record award in 1965 for its high number of sales. It sold a total of 48,000 copies.

== Background ==
The song was made famous by the Johnny Band in 1965, a year in which they sold nearly 50,000 copies. The song, which dates to 1929, was originally composed by Albert Edvin Pedersen with lyrics by Per Kvist. It was originally a Foxtrot and was released the same year by singer Einar Rose. Its original title is “My Little Sweetheart”, and the song was originally written for the music contest Jazzmusikkonkurransen 1929, where it came in as number three. The song was first released on a 78 rpm disc record in 1929 by the record company Odeon.

The cover version by The Johnny Band sold 48,000 copies soon after their initial concert at Park Hotel. The Johnny Band and John Klemetsen's version of the song is in the genre of Schlager music. The band first performed the song at Sandefjord's Park Hotel in 1965 and it quickly became one of Norway's most sold singles.

== Charts ==
The song reached the top ten on the chart in Norway on numerous occasions in the mid-1960s. It was No. 10 in November 1965, and in January 1966, it peaked at No. 4 in Norway. In February 1966, it was No. 6.

The Decca Records cover version by the Johnny Band sold over 25,000 copies and was awarded the official Norwegian silver record award in 1966. It is a family rock or beat music version of the original song and became a breakthrough for the Johnny Band as their biggest hit. The gold and silver record awards had been handed out annually by the newspaper Arbeiderbladet since 1960.

== Cover versions ==
The song has been covered by several artists, including:

- The Johnny Band
- Ivar Ruste
- Rune Rudberg
- Ronald Holmberg
- Zelimir Kulisic
- Arne Mørch
