= Willy Andresen =

Norwegian jazz pianist

- Born: 18 October 1921; Oslo, Norway
- Died: 17 June 2016 (aged 94)
- Occupation: Pianist

Willy Andresen (18 October 1921 – 17 June 2016) was a Norwegian jazz pianist.

He was born in Oslo, and was appointed at the Norwegian Broadcasting Corporation from 1959 to 1991.

He often backed singer Erik Bye during his performances in Norway and the United States. He was in charge of several of the song recordings by child star Grethe Kausland, and composed the melody of Otto Nielsen's song "Pappa'n til Tove Mette".

Andresen also appeared in the Erik Bye film Giganten (2005). Together with Bye, he wrote Josephine Baker 's last release, Lend Your Ear (1973). Andresen also wrote much of the music for Bye's albums, such as Gammel er min fjord from 1974.

Andresen received the Gammleng Prize in 1991 in the "veteran" category. He also contributed to releases with Vidar Sandbeck ( En fergemanns vise – for voksne , 2003) and towards the end of his career led his own quartet with Stig Hvalryg (bass), Svein Christiansen (bass) and Svenn-Erik Nilsen (vocals).
