= Olaf Kronstad =

Norwegian actor (1892–1939)

- Born: December 2, 1892; Årstad, Norway
- Died: July 14, 1939 (aged 46)
- Occupation: Actor
- Spouse: Botten Soot

Olaf Kronstad (born Olav Hansen, December 2, 1892 – July 14, 1939) was a Norwegian stage and film actor.

== Life ==
Olaf Kronstad was born Olaf Hansen in Årstad, the son of the tanner Ludvig Hansen (later Øvrebø) and his wife Johanne. Kronstad married the actress Botten Soot in 1924. He married the Red Cross nurse Gunvor Tønseth (1907–1983) in 1939.

== Career ==
Kronstad made his stage debut in 1918 in the cabaret production Chat Noir i Bergen. He appeared as Touffleux in René Mercier's operetta Benjamin at the Mayol Theater in 1925. He also performed at the Chat Noir cabaret and revue theater and at the New Theater in Oslo. In 1934 he appeared in the film Op med hodet!

== Filmography ==
- 1934: Op med hodet! as an actor
