= Einar Schanke =

Norwegian composer, pianist, revue writer, theatre director and theatrical producer

Einar Leonard Schanke (19 May 1927 – 23 February 1992) was a Norwegian composer, pianist, revue writer, theatre director and theatrical producer. He wrote revues for the Edderkoppen Theatre, and later for Chat Noir, where he was also director from 1962 to 1975.

== Personal life ==
Schanke was born in Oslo as the son of baker Einar Schanke and Engeline Vindenes. He was married to Karin Anne Brit ("Lollo") Andreassen from 1960. He died in Oslo in 1992.

== Career ==
After graduating as a student in 1947, Schanke became active as a freelance swing jazz musician from 1949, and as a writer for various amateur- and student revues from 1950. In 1956 he cooperated with Bjørn Sand to create the revue Med vinger på, as well as a new version of the comedy success Bare jatt me'n, both set up at Edderkoppen Teater. With Alfred Næss, he presented the revue Ferske Fjes in 1957 at Chat Noir, where Schanke served as conductor, writer, composer and at times theatre manager. He was the director there from 1962 to 1975. Early in his career, Schanke wrote revue classics such as "En dåre kan spørre" for Arvid Nilssen, and "Ro" for Kurt Foss and Reidar Bøe, as well as song texts for Wenche Myhre and Nora Brockstedt. He composed melodies for classic revue numbers like "Kjære lille Norge", "Evergreen", "Syng og vær glad" and "Festen er over".

He acquired the Edderkoppen Theatre in 1967, which he renamed 'ABC-teatret'. He started the record company Cat Music in the 1960s. Among his most popular albums were Kjære lille Norge from 1972, for which he was awarded Spellemannprisen, and Einar Schankes Gledeshus from 1974. He issued albums with Rolv Wesenlund and Harald Heide-Steen Jr., including Og takk for det from 1970, and the Hørerør series. He also issued albums with Rolf Søder, Odd Børretzen and Arthur Arntzen. He staged several musicals at the ABC theatre, including Norwegian adaptations of The Fantastics and The Little Shop of Horrors.

Throughout the 1950s, Schanke became responsible for a new style of revue, performed entirely for the open stage without the traditional music numbers played before a closed carpet during scene shifts. Jazz-inspired, more show-oriented music which was primarily self-composed replaced the saloon-themed accompaniment common at the time. Schanke's theatre is often called 'jazz-revue', not only due to the choice of music genre, but also for its seemingly improvised, more casual theatre-expression.

Schanke had an eye for talent, and was not only responsible for introducing many fresh pens and faces, but pulled many established names from theatre and popular music into his revues. Examples include Jon Eikemo, Kirsti Sparboe, Ole Paus, Inger Lise Rypdal, Kjersti Holmen, and Øivind Blunck.

The Leonard Statuette is named after him. He was a Knight of the Order of St. Olav.
