= How Could You, Jean? =

1918 film

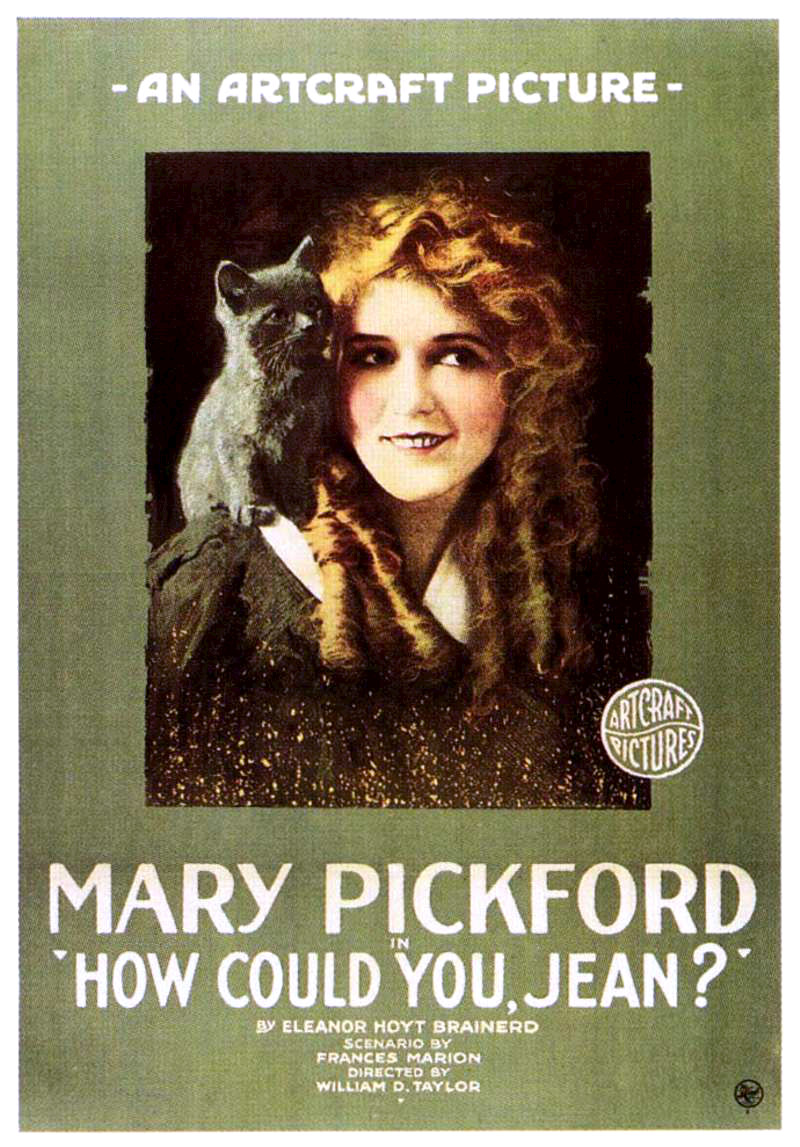
- Theatrical release poster
- Directed by: William Desmond Taylor
- Written by: Eleanor Hoyt Brainerd (novel); Frances Marion
- Produced by: Mary Pickford
- Starring: Mary Pickford
- Cinematography: Charles Rosher
- Production company: Famous Players–Lasky/Artcraft
- Distributed by: Paramount Pictures
- Release date: June 20, 1918
- Country: United States
- Language: Silent (English intertitles)

How Could You, Jean? is a 1918 American silent comedy-drama film, starring Mary Pickford, directed by William Desmond Taylor, and based on a novel by Eleanor Hoyt Brainerd. Casson Ferguson was the male lead; Spottiswoode Aitken and a young ZaSu Pitts had supporting roles.

This is a lost film, with no known surviving prints.

== Plot ==
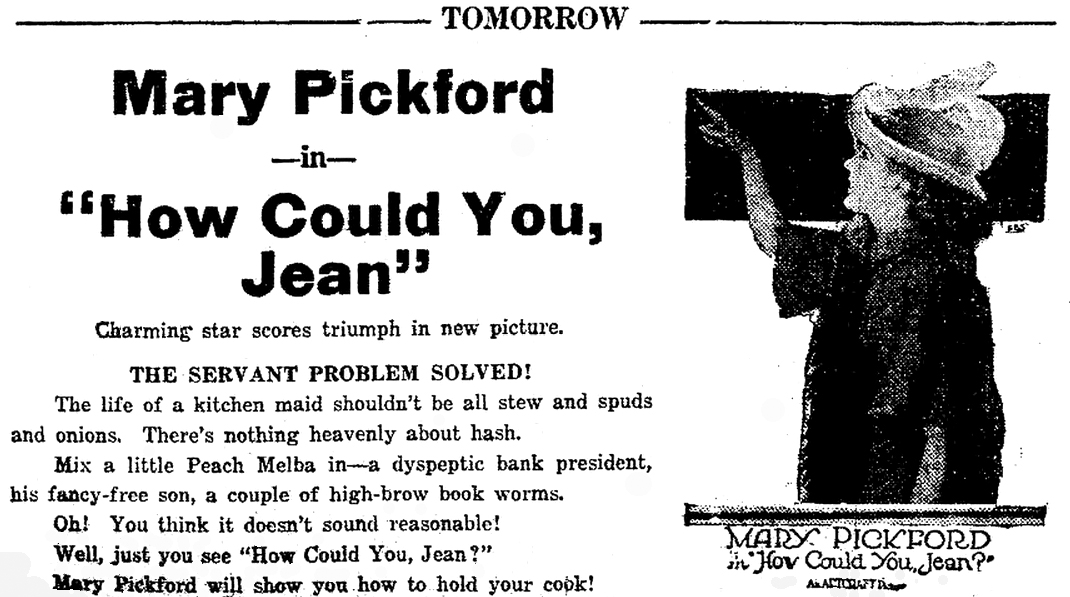
July 5, 1918 advertisement for How Could You, Jean?.

The plot involves a young socialite pretending to be a cook, who falls in love with a man she thinks is a hired hand, but he is actually a millionaire. The film was not well received by critics, who generally found it pleasant but dull, although The New York Times called it "a funny, extremely well-produced comedy".

== Cast ==
- Mary Pickford as Jean Mackaye
- Casson Ferguson as Ted Burton Jr.
- Spottiswoode Aitken as Rufus Bonner
- Herbert Standing as Burton Sr.
- Fanny Midgley as Mrs. Bonner
- Lawrence Peyton as Oscar (credited as Larry Peyton)
- ZaSu Pitts as Oscar's Sweetheart
- Maie B. Havey as Susan Cooper (credited as Mabelle Harvey)
- Lucille Ward as Mrs. Kate Morley
- Emily Gerdes as Morley Child (credited as Emma Gerdes)
- Wesley Barry as Morley Child
- Burwell Hamrick as Morley Child
- Althea Worthley as Morley Child
- Joan Marsh as Morley Child (credited as Dorothy Rosher)
- Jack Herbert as Morley Child

== Film with similar plot ==
A novel by Norwegian writer Sigrid Boo, Vi som går kjøkkenveien (We Who Enter Through the Kitchen) has an almost identical plot to Brainerd's original book. Boo's novel was adapted for the American film Servants' Entrance (1934) starring Janet Gaynor, which had an identical plot to the 1918 film. As The New York Times commented, "apparently, the old Pickford comedy was already forgotten, and no copyright infringement suit was filed."

== See also ==
- List of lost films
