= I kongens klæ'r =

I kongens klæ'r or I kongens klær may refer to:

- I kongens klæ'r (1954 film), a Danish film
- I kongens klær (1933 film), a Norwegian film
