= Ella Peaters =

Norwegian actress, revue artist, singer, and circus performer (1907–1991)

- Born: February 13, 1907; Skien, Norway
- Died: March 14, 1991 (aged 84); Oslo, Norway
- Resting place: Cemetery of Our Saviour
- Occupations: Actress, revue artist, singer, and circus performer

Ella Zefora Peaters (born Ella Zefora Hansen, February 13, 1907 – March 14, 1991) was a Norwegian actress, revue artist, singer, and circus performer.

Peaters was born in Skien, Norway. She debuted at age four as a line dancer and then toured as a circus performer, dancer, hit singer, variety artist, and revue prima donna. Peaters was engaged at Dovrehallen as a folk ballad singer and was also associated with the Scala Theater in Copenhagen and Chat Noir in Oslo. She also worked abroad. Peaters starred in two Norwegian films and in one Danish film in the 1930s.

She was married to the Norwegian pianist, composer, and conductor Alf Peaters. Ella Peaters is buried at the Cemetery of Our Saviour in Oslo.

== Filmography ==
- 1933: Op med hodet! as Gerda, a dancer and singer
- 1933: I kongens klær
- 1936: Cirkusrevyen 1936 as herself / various roles

== Discography ==
- "Det smil som du engang gav mig, foxtrot" / "Med kjekkhet og frekkhet, sjømannsvals," Odeon A–180865–D-3168
- "Da gråter lille vennen, sjømannsvals" / "Det er månen som har skylden, foxtrot," Odeon A–180633–D-3234
- "Da var det en sjømann som ...., sjømannsvals" / "Half and Half, foxtrot," Odeon A–180655–D-3256
