= Julie Lampe =

Norwegian actress (1870–1948)

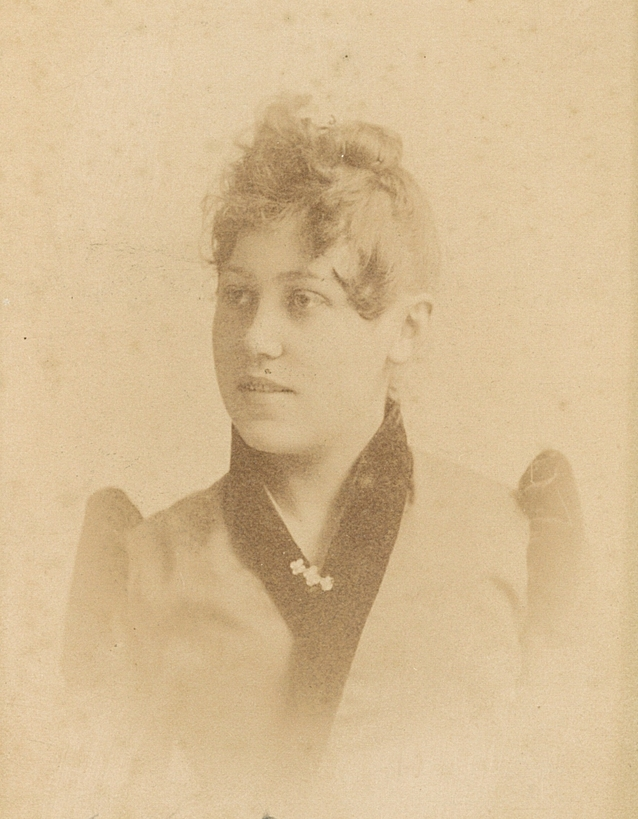
- Born: July 13, 1870; Bergen, Norway
- Died: December 20, 1948 (aged 78)
- Occupation: Actress

Julie Lampe (a.k.a. Julie Christensen Lampe, July 13, 1870 – December 20, 1948) was a Norwegian actress.

== Career ==
Julie Lampe made her debut in 1888 at the National Theater in Bergen and remained there until 1899. From 1901 to 1935, she was one of the leading actresses at the National Theatre in Oslo. Especially in classic comedies, she created unfailingly real characters such as Magdelone in Den sundesløse, Mette in Kjærlighet uten strømper, and Mor Aase in Peer Gynt. With warmth and a sense of reality, she also played tragic roles such as the nurse in August Strindberg's Fadren. She performed roles at the theater from 1900 to 1938, and she appeared in 165 productions during the period. She also appeared in six feature films.

== Theater roles (selected) ==
- 1900: Baldevins bryllup as Madam Sørensen
- 1923: Peer Gynt as Mor Aase
- 1929: Den sundesløse as Magdelone
- 1931: Fadren as Amman
- 1935: Kjærlighet uten strømper as Mette
- 1938: Jacob von Thyboe as Leonora

== Filmography ==
- 1926: Glomdalsbruden as Old Guri
- 1927: Den glade enke i Trangvik as the widow Salvesen
- 1927: Troll-elgen as Turi Trefothaugen, Hans's mother
- 1931: Den store barnedåpen as Miss Jahr
- 1934: Op med hodet! as Theobald's mother
- 1936: Dyrk jorden! as Øverli
