= Leif Amble-Næss =

Norwegian actor, singer, and theater director

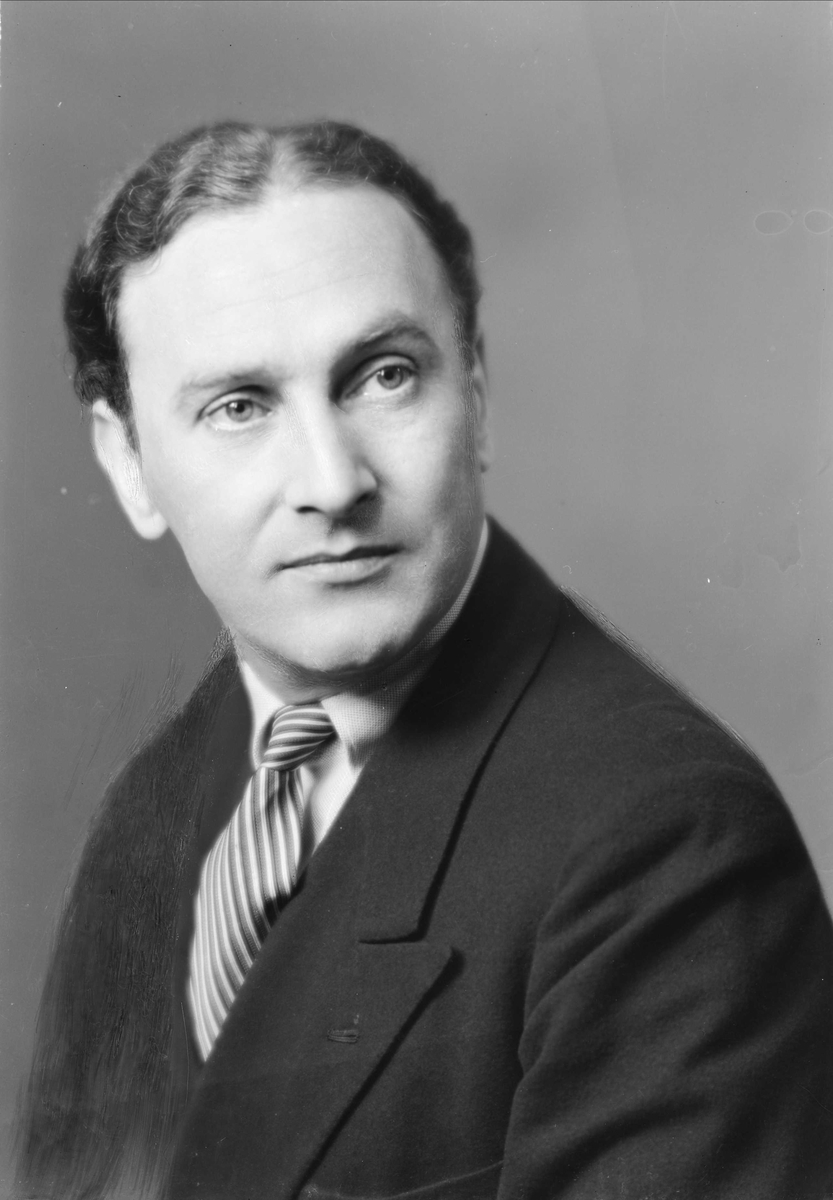
- Leif Amble-Næss in 1934
- Born: 8 May 1896; Bjarkøy, Norway
- Died: 18 January 1974 (aged 77); Stockholm, Sweden
- Occupations: Actor, singer, theater director
- Parent(s): Leonard Næss, Elise Amble

Leif Amble-Næss (8 May 1896 – 18 January 1974) was a Norwegian actor, singer, and theater director.

Amble-Næss debuted in 1916 at Oslo's Central Theater, where he mostly appeared in comedies and operettas. At the National Theater he directed and appeared in Franz Lehár's The Merry Widow in 1938. He also directed Johann Strauss II's Die Fledermaus in 1931. From 1936 onward he lived in Stockholm, where he was associated with the Oscar Theater and the Blanche Theater, and in 1955 he became the director of the Folkan Theater, where he also acted. Later he was engaged with the National Swedish Touring Theatre. In the 1950s he appeared in some performances at Chat Noir in Oslo.

Leif Amble-Næss is considered one of the leading Norwegian leading actors in comedies and revues during the interwar period. As a singer and cabaret artist, he was a sharp satirist and clever humorist. His versatile talent meant that he also achieved success as a traditional dancer and step dancer, and he had a firm command of revue songs. Several of his revue successes were recorded for His Master's Voice in the 1930s.

Amble-Næss also appeared in some Norwegian and Swedish films, including Den store barnedåpen (1931), Op med hodet! (1933), Mot nya tider (1939), and Den gula bilen (1963).

== Filmography ==
- 1931: Den store barnedåpen as the Anabaptist
- 1933: En stille flirt as Doktor Gerhardt, a beautician
- 1934: Op med hodet! as the ballet instructor
- 1939: Mot nya tider as Harald Bothner, Norwegian government minister
- 1940: Med dej i mina armar as Sardini
- 1941: Lärarinna på vift as a nightclub guest
- 1945: Rattens musketörer as the angry man on the phone (uncredited)
- 1954: Flottans glada gossar as the porter at the French hotel
- 1954: Seger i mörker as the professor in Zürich (cut footage)
- 1956: Skorpan as a tourist
- 1958: Du är mitt äventyr as a jury member at the art exhibition
- 1963: Den gula bilen as Curt Lorénz, the embassy councilor
