= Lillebil Ibsen =

Norwegian dancer and actress (1899–1989)

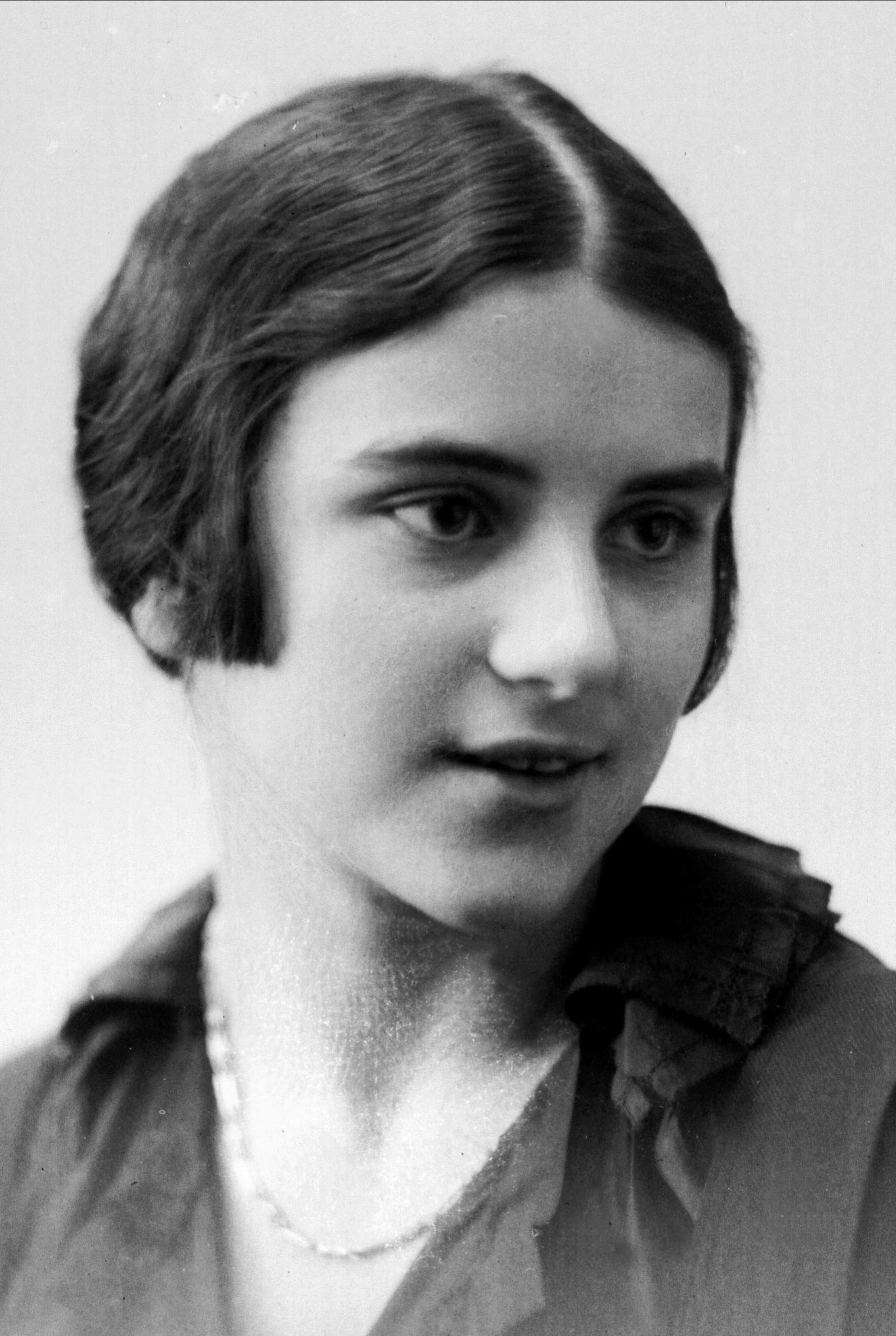
- Lillebil Krohn 1916, by Gustav Borgen
- Born: Sofie Parelius Monrad Krohn; 6 August 1899; Kristiania
- Died: 22 August 1989 (aged 90); Oslo
- Other name: Lillebil Christensen
- Occupation: Actress
- Years active: 1911–1969
- Spouse: Tancred Ibsen (1919–1978)
- Mother: Gyda Christensen
- Awards: Commander of the Royal Norwegian Order of St. Olav

Lillebil Ibsen (born Sofie Parelius Monrad Krohn, 6 August 1899 – 22 August 1989) was a Norwegian dancer and actress.

== Personal life ==
Lillebil was born in Kristiania, as the daughter of engineer Georg Monrad Krohn and actress Gyda Martha Kristine Andersen (later Gyda Christensen). She married pilot and film director Tancred Ibsen on 25 August 1919. Their son Tancred Ibsen Jr., born in 1921, was a Norwegian diplomat.

== Career ==
Lillebil Ibsen took ballet lessons at an early age with her mother, who was a professional choreographer and ballet instructor. She made her début as a dancer at Nationaltheatret in 1911, in the ballet pantomime Prinsessen på erten, an adaptation of the story The Princess and the Pea by Hans Christian Andersen. She then studied ballet with Hans Beck in Copenhagen, and later with Russian choreographer Mikhail Fokine. She started performing in Berlin under supervision of Max Reinhardt when she was sixteen years old, and played leading roles in Reinhardt's pantomimes Die Schäferin, Lillebils Hochzeitsreise, Prima Ballerina, Sumurun and Die grüne Flöte. She made her stage début as actress at Nationaltheatret in Kristiania in 1915, in the children's comedy Den uskikkelige lille prinsesse.

Ibsen's first film role was in Sången om den eldröda blomman, in 1919. She made her début as a revue artist at Chat Noir in 1924. She worked at Det Nye Teater from 1929 to 1956, where she played classical comedy roles as well as a series of Ibsen characters, such as "Nora", "Mrs Alving" and "Gina Ekdal". From 1956 to 1969 Lillebil performed at Nationaltheatret, where she played both dramatic and comic roles. She also played for the television theatre Fjernsynsteatret. One of Lillebil's well known film roles was a stand-out performance in Arne Mattsson's cult mystery thriller Mannequin in Red (1958); where Ibsen played a notable supporting role as the fashion house mogul Thyra Lennberg.

Ibsen authored a autobiography titled Det begynte med dansen. She was decorated Commander of the Royal Norwegian Order of St. Olav in 1969. She died in Oslo in 1989.

== Filmography ==
Year	Title	Role	Notes
1918	Europe, General Delivery		
1919	Sången om den eldröda blomman	Eli	
1920	Christian Wahnschaffe	Eva Sorel	
1921	Die Flucht aus dem goldenen Kerker	Eva Sorel	
1922	Pan	Eva	
1931	Lika inför lagen	Sonja	
1934	Op med hodet!	Lill, Ballettpike	
1955	Arthurs forbrytelse	Diana	
1958	Mannekäng i rött (Mannequin in Red)	Thyra Lennberg	
1968	Prinsessa på villovägar	Aunt Augusta	
1979	Somewhere, Sometime		(final film role)
