= Dizzie Tunes =

Norwegian musical group

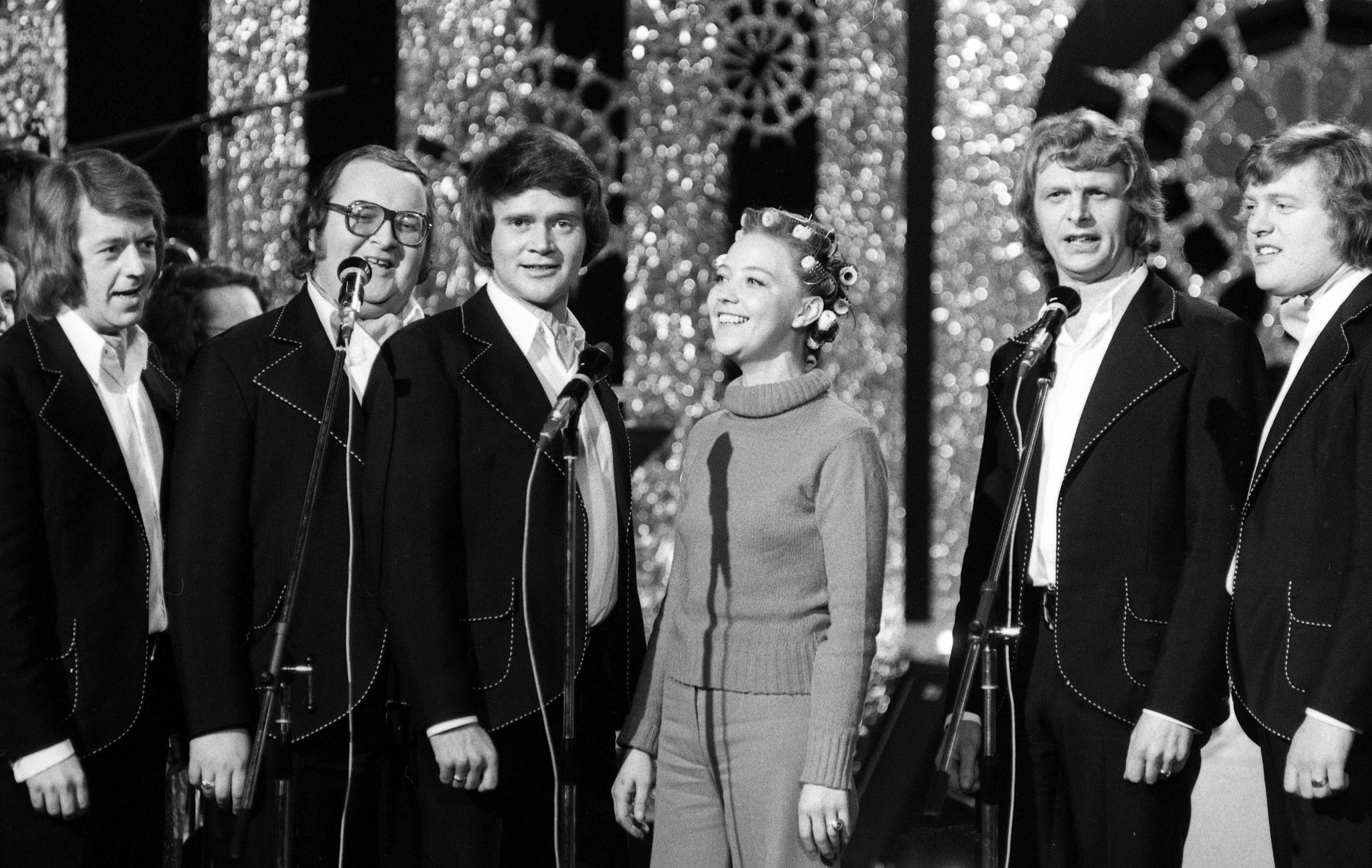
- Dizzie Tunes with Grethe Kausland

Background information
- Labels: Troll, Mini Troll, Polar, Viking Music, Cat, Polar, Metronome, Expert, USM, Home's Musikk, NRK

Dizzie Tunes was a Norwegian musical show group from the city of Skien. Dizzie Tunes was one of the most successful in Norwegian show business.

== Biography ==
The group was founded as the dance band Rex Band in 1959, was named Dizzie Tunes in 1962, and disbanded in 2002. The regular group members were Yngvar Numme, Svein-Helge Høgberg, Øyvind Klingberg, Tor Erik Gunstrøm and Einar Idland. Their record debut came in 1963 with the single "Mette Mette Mette". Their first album was called Dizzie Tunes (1967). Their first revue was Å, så heldig vi er, staged at Chat Noir in 1966 and starring Wenche Myhre. Their next revues were Syv glade lerker på en blå gren from 1969 and Show før jo heller from 1971. In 1972 singer and actress Grethe Kausland starred at the revue På scenekanten, and she later regularly performed with the group. Other revues were Memories of Music from 1980 and The show must go home from 1984. The 1988 revue Festsprell i Dizzie Tider had Hege Schøyen and Jon Skolmen as guest stars, and Dizzie og Damene at Chat Noir in 1993 had Elisabeth Andreassen and Ellen Nikolaysen as guest performers. In their comedy routines Numme and Gunstrøm became an iconic couple playing their characteristic parts, exchanging insults and witty retorts, with Numme attempting to teach and direct the hopelessly inept Gunstrøm in various tunes and performances. Gunstrøm's comedic talent would often make the audience bowl over laughing.

The group won the Spellemannprisen award for 1973 for best children's album, with Den aller siste ra-ta-ta-ta. They reached a large public through their television shows. Their television show Sim Sala Bim from 1973 won the Bronze Rose at the Festival Rose d'Or in Montreux. The film Tut og kjør was produced in 1975. The group was awarded the statuette Snill Gutt in 1988, the Swedish Lisebergapplåden in 1991, the Jens Book-Jenssen's prize in 1993, and the Leonard Statuette in 1993. A square in the city Skien was named "Dizzie Tunes plass" in 1999.

== Band members ==
- Yngvar Numme – front vocals, textwriter, trumpet
- Tor Erik Gunstrøm – drums, vocals
- Øyvind Klingberg – piano, vocals
- Svein Helge Høgberg – bass, vocals
- Einar Idland – guitar, vocals
