= Vi som går kjøkkenveien =

1933 film

- Directed by: Tancred Ibsen; Gustaf Molander
- Written by: Sigrid Boo; Sölve Cederstrand; Tancred Ibsen; Gustaf Molander
- Based on: Sigrid Boo's novel Vi som går kjøkkenveien
- Starring: Theodor Berge; Randi Brænne; Eva Steen; Steinar Jøraandstad; Ulf Selmer; Aagot Didriksen
- Cinematography: Åke Dahlqvist
- Edited by: Tancred Ibsen
- Music by: Eric Bengtson
- Distributed by: Oslo Talefilm A/S
- Release date: February 20, 1933
- Running time: 97 minutes
- Country: Norway
- Language: Norwegian

Vi som går kjøkkenveien (We Who Enter Through the Kitchen) is a Norwegian comedy film from 1933. The film was a joint production between the Norwegian and Swedish film industries, and it was shot in parallel with a Swedish version titled Vi som går köksvägen. Both versions of the film were directed by Tancred Ibsen and Gustaf Molander. The lead roles in the Norwegian version were played by Theodor Berge and Randi Brænne, whereas the Swedish version starred Carl Barcklind, Tutta Berntzen, and Bengt Djurberg.

The indoor scenes in the film were shot at Filmstaden in Råsunda. The outdoor scenes were shot in Tollare and Saxtorp, southeast of Landskrona.

The Swedish version of the film was released in 1932. The Norwegian version had its premiere at Konsertpalæet in Bergen on February 3, 1933. The film's Oslo premiere took place on February 20, 1933.

== Cast (Norwegian version) ==
- Ulf Selmer as Adolf Beck, a landowner
- Theodor Berge as Breder, Helga's father, a motorcycle manufacturer
- Randi Brænne as Helga Breder / Helga Haraldson, Breder's daughter
- Steinar Jøraandstad as Frigaard, Beck's chauffeur
- Gunhild Schytte-Jacobsen as Mrs. Beck
- Hilda Fredriksen as Laura, Beck's cook
- Joachim Holst-Jensen as Pontus the editor
- Aagot Didriksen as Laura Pontus
- Renée Björling as Astrid, Beck's daughter
- Tove Tellback as Ellen, Beck's daughter
- Einar Fagstad as Opstan, a sexton and schoolteacher
- Egil Hjorth-Jenssen as Anders, Beck's servant boy
- Ragna Breda as Olga, Beck's servant girl
- Harald Heide Steen as Jørgen Krogh
- Eva Steen as Aunt Alexandra
