= Dag Vågsås =

Norwegian actor (born 1954)

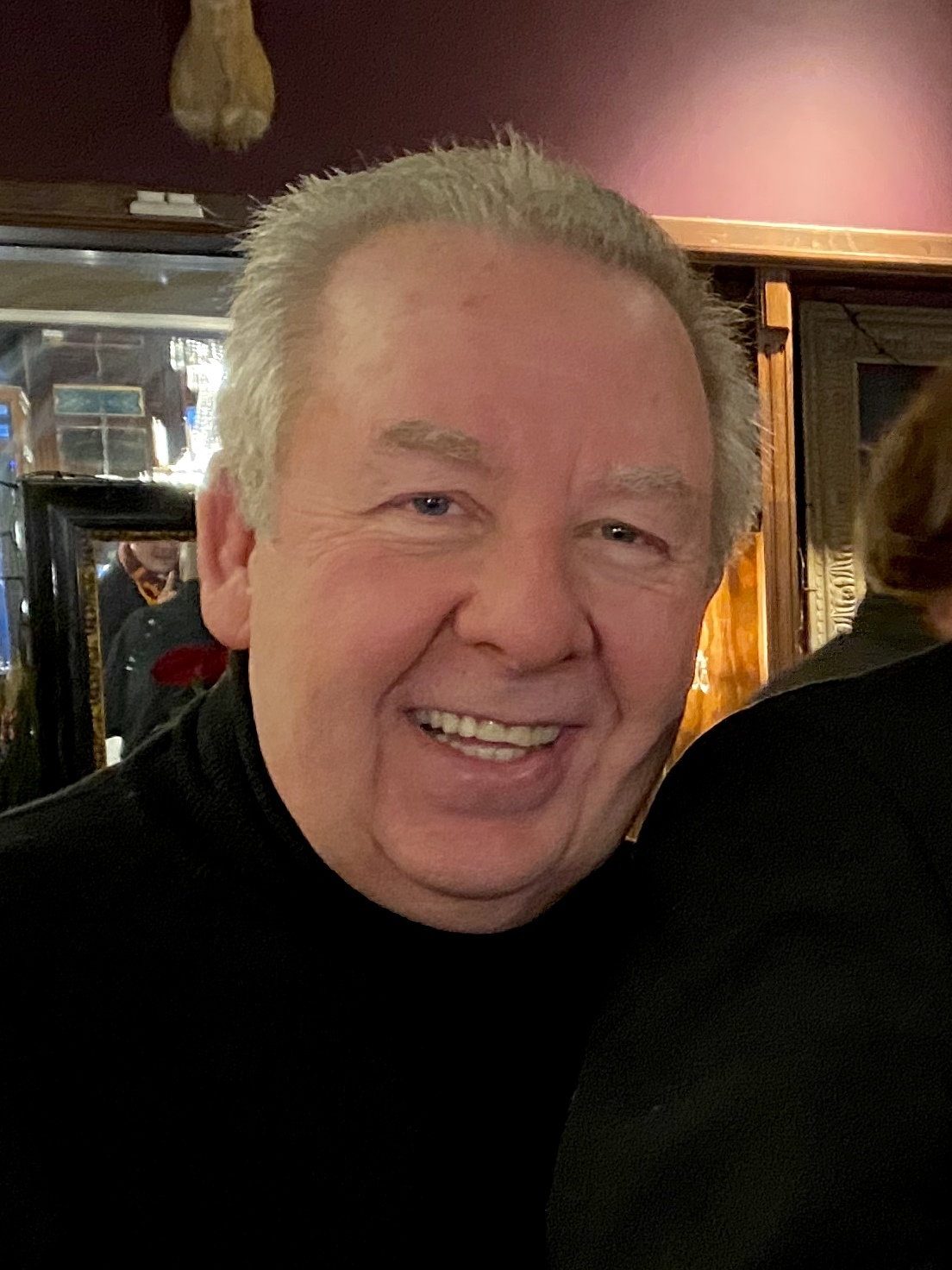
- Dag Vågsås in 2019
- Born: 17 May 1954 (age 71)
- Occupations: Actor; instructor; choreographer

Dag Vågsås (born 17 May 1954) is a Norwegian actor, instructor and choreographer.

He has had a varied career in Norwegian culture, with many roles in theatre, TV and film – in comedies, Farces, musicals, and mostly, in revues. He has also worked a lot in children's entertainment, for example, the Christmas show on Putti Plutti Pott and stories on Den lille traktoren Gråtass. He has also read audiobooks and had vocal roles in Norwegian versions of foreign children's films.

Dag Vågsås sits on the panel of Norsk Revyforfatter-forening and has for many years been a part of ABC-teateret and Chat Noir in Oslo. He has also written many articles and essays on film and musicals.
