= Kristian Hauger =

Norwegian musician (1905–1977)

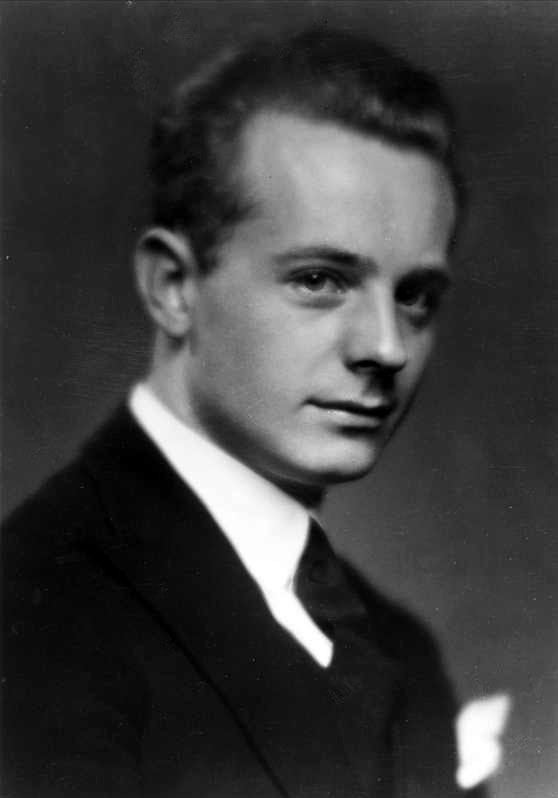
- Born: 24 October 1905; Kristiania
- Died: 18 October 1977 (aged 71)
- Occupations: Pianist, orchestra leader and composer of popular music

Kristian Hauger (24 October 1905 – 18 October 1977) was a Norwegian pianist, orchestra leader and composer of popular music from the late 1920s to mid 1950s.

Kristian Asbjørn Hauger was born in Kristiania (now Oslo), Norway. His father, Hans August Hauger (1867–1928) was a businessman who operated the Norwegian Christmas Card Company (Norsk Julekortudsalg). He studied musical theory with composer Gustav Fredrik Lange (1861–1939) during 1921–22. From 1921 to 1925, he was a student of piano composer Nils Larsen (1888–1937).

He formed the Kristian Hauger Jazz Orchestra in 1929 and became known to a wider audience with the Kristian Hauger Radio Dance Orchestra, which became a widely used studio orchestra in the 1930s. With his orchestra he also recorded a large number of his own compositions. He was musical director of the jazz stage at Bristol from 1928 to 1930, at Le Chat Noir from 1930 to 1936 and at Centralteatret on Akersgata in Oslo from 1936 to 1959.

He composed about one thousand melodies throughout his career. His first composition was the prize-winning Charleston i Grukkedalen, which became a great success. Among his songs are Blåklokker (1929, lyrics Herbert Herding), En Oslodag (1933, text Per Kvist), En herre med bart (1942, text Finn Bø) and Når kastanjene blomstrer i Bygdø Allé (1950, text Gunnar Kaspersen).
