= Per Kvist =

Norwegian revue writer, entertainer, stage actor, film actor and children's writer

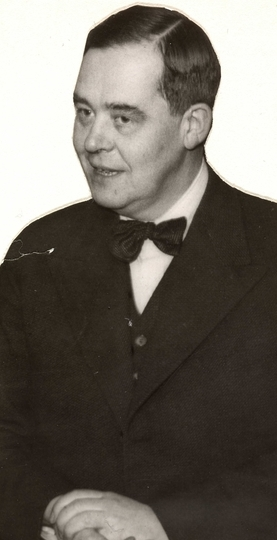
- Per Kvist, c. 1933
- Born: Vidar Wexelsen; 4 April 1890; Overhalla Municipality, Norway
- Died: 23 May 1947 (aged 57)
- Occupations: revue writer, entertainer, stage actor, film actor and children's writer
- Parent: Vilhelm Andreas Wexelsen
- Relatives: Gunnar Jahn (cousin); Karl Evang (nephew); Vilhelm Evang (nephew)

Per Kvist was the artist name of Vidar Wexelsen (4 April 1890 – 23 May 1947), a Norwegian revue writer, entertainer, stage actor, film actor and children's writer.

== Personal life ==
Wexelsen was born in Overhalla Municipality as a son of vicar, politician and eventually bishop Vilhelm Andreas Wexelsen and Anna Beata Nilssen. He was a cousin of Gunnar Jahn and uncle of Karl Evang. He spent long periods of his childhood in Kristiania, when his father was a member of the Storting and of the government. From 1905 to his death in 1909 his father was appointed bishop of the Diocese of Nidaros in Trondheim. Out of consideration for his well-regarded family he adopted the nom de guerre Per Kvist.

He was married twice. In 1919 he married Kally Bachke (née Løchen), a daughter of painter and actor Kalle Løchen. After their divorce in 1931, he married actress Sigrun Svenningsen in 1932. Though he was publicly best known by his pen and stage name Per Kvist, he insisted on being called Vidar Wexelsen in the private sphere. He died from cancer in 1947.

== Career ==
Wexelsen assumed a student position with the Fahlstrøms Theater from 1909 to 1910. Then he worked as sailor for two years, and thereafter a period as clerk at a railway office. While working as a salesman, Wexelsen also edited the satirical magazine Tyrihans, and wrote songs for Bokken Lasson's cabaret Chat Noir. From 1916 he was assigned at Chat Noir as actor and text writer, and he eventually started using the artist name Per Kvist. He published the song collection 16 cabaretviser in 1920. He wrote his first revue, Midt i planeten together with Arne Svendsen in 1922. In 1923 he published a second song collection, Tolv viser. Among his songs was the popular "En Oslodag", which he wrote in cooperation with composer Kristian Hauger, and "Å blei d'a dei (din blei)?" from the 1925 revue Summetonen, which became Lalla Carlsen's breakthrough. In the 1920s he wrote a series of autobiographically based books for children, including Glade gutteår from 1925, Stud. midd. Nils from 1926, Nils dekksgutt from 1927, and Den røde hånds liga from 1929. From 1927 to 1929 he operated his own cabaret, To Små Kroner, and in the 1930s he again worked for Chat Noir. From 1942 to 1947 he wrote revues for the Edderkoppen Theatre, including the theatre's first revue Saker og ting. Among his later songs is "Optimisten og pessimisten".

He appeared in minor roles in a number of films in the 1920s and 1930s, including the character "Elias" in Fantegutten from 1932, and as "Mathias" in De vergeløse from 1939. He also wrote the children's comedy Pers fødselsdag from 1946.
