= Theodor Berge =

Norwegian actor

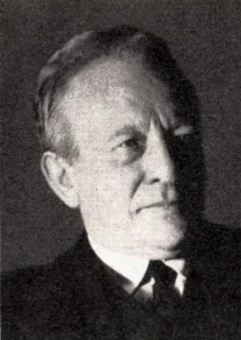
- Born: April 5, 1869; Bergen, Norway
- Died: April 9, 1946 (aged 77); Oslo, Norway
- Occupation(s): Actor, theater director

Theodor Berge (April 5, 1869 – April 9, 1946) was a Norwegian actor and theater director.

From around 1900 onward, Berge was mainly associated with the Central Theater, where he played in and directed many comedies and plays. Among his most significant roles were Pastor Manders in Ghosts and Helmer in A Doll's House. As a director, he made a name for himself in his production of Little Eyolf in 1929. At the end of his career, he appeared in Norwegian films such as Den store barnedåpen (1931; Norway's first sound film), Vi som går kjøkkenveien (1933), and Trysil-Knut (1942).

== Filmography ==
- 1931: Den store barnedåpen as the parish priest
- 1933: Vi som går kjøkkenveien as Breder
- 1942: Trysil-Knut as the judge
