= Agnethe Schibsted-Hansson =

Norwegian actress (1868–1951)

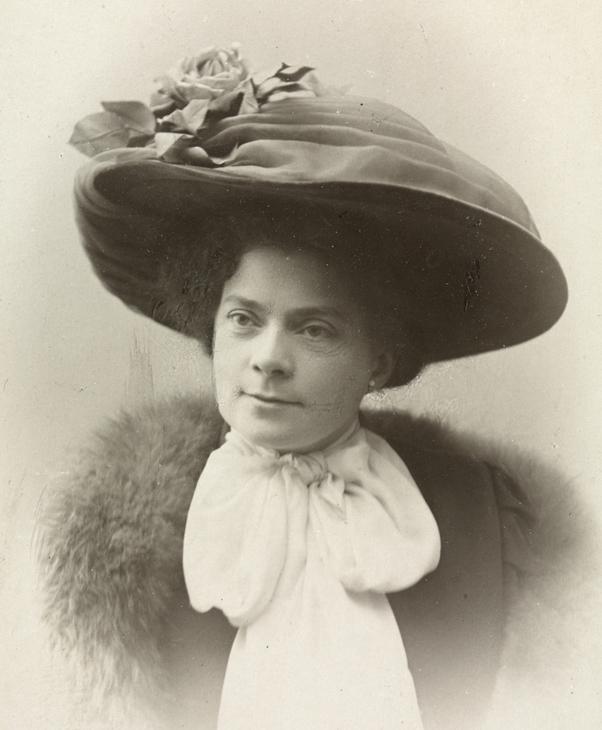
- Born: September 21, 1868; Bergen, Norway
- Died: January 7, 1951 (aged 82)
- Occupation: Actress
- Spouse: Olaf Mørch Hansson
- Parents: Otto Emil Schibsted (father); Elisabeth Catharina Schibsted (née Strøm) (mother)

Agnethe Elisabeth Schibsted-Hansson (born Agnethe Schibsted; September 21, 1868 – January 7, 1951) was a Norwegian actress.

== Family ==
Agnethe Schibsted-Hansson was born in Bergen, Norway to the actor Christian Otto Emil Schibsted and Elisabeth Cathrine Strøm. On December 23, 1896, she married the actor Olaf Mørch Hansson.

== Life and work ==
Agnethe Schibsted-Hansson debuted on April 20, 1891, at the Christiania Theater in the role of Valborg in En fallit. She participated in the theater's tour to most provincial towns in 1892, when several plays were performed.

She was then engaged with the Carl Johan Theater from 1893 to 1895, the National Theater in Bergen from 1895 to 1899, and several theaters in Kristiania (now Oslo). Schibsted-Hansson became permanently engaged with the National Theatre in Oslo in 1912 after having periodically appeared there since its opening in 1899.

Marking her 25th anniversary as an actress in 1916, Schibsted-Hansson played the title role in the play Mrs. Warren's Profession.

She excelled as a character actor, with a robust mood for creating realistic Oslo figures in Oskar Braaten's comedies. Among other things, Schibsted-Hansson made an impression as Dobbelt-Petra in Tancred Ibsen's film adaptation of Den store barnedåpen (The Great Christening, 1931).

== Theater roles ==
- Valborg in En fallit by Bjørnstjerne Bjørnson (Christiania Theater, 1891)
- Mathilde in De Nygifte by Bjørnstjerne Bjørnson (Christiania Theater tour, 1892)
- Constance Flemmer in Die Versucherin (Norwegian: En Fristerinde) by Gustav von Moser (Christiania Theater tour, 1892)
- Lotte in Unter vier Augen (Norwegian: Under fire Øine) by Ludwig Fulda (Christiania Theater tour, 1892)
- Ellen in Kamerater by August Strindberg (Christiania Theater tour, 1892)
- Jane Eyre in Die Waise aus Lowood (Norwegian: Jane Eyre) by Charlotte Birch-Pfeiffer (Carl Johan Theater, 1895)
- Hedda in Hedda Gabler by Henrik Ibsen (National Theater, Bergen, 1895)
- Sara in Lystige Koner by Jonas Lie (National Theater, Bergen, 1895)
- Ragnhild in Svend Dyrings Hus by Henrik Hertz (National Theater, Bergen, 1895)
- Angelique in Thermidor (Norwegian: Et farligt Brev) by Victorien Sardou (National Theater, Bergen, 1896)
- Maria Stuart in Maria Stuart i Skotland by Bjørnstjerne Bjørnson (National Theater, Bergen, 1896)
- Lydia Wisby in Laboremus by Bjørnstjerne Bjørnson (National Theater, Oslo, 1901)
- Mrs. Dag in Daglannet by Bjørnstjerne Bjørnson (National Theater, Oslo, 1905)
- Aasta Maria in Ei Hemkome by Sigurd Eldegard (National Theater, Oslo, 1907)
- Karen in Karen, Maren, Mette by Anker Larsen and Egil Rostrup (Fahlstrøm Theater, 1911)
- Mrs. Warren in Mrs. Warren's Profession (Norwegian: Fru Warrens Forretning) by George Bernard Shaw (National Theater, Oslo, 1916)
- Ane in Geografi og Kærlighed by Bjørnstjerne Bjørnson (National Theater guest performance, Ringerike, 1922)
- Madam Rundholmen in De unges Forbund by Henrik Ibsen (National Theater, Oslo, 1925)
- Josefine in Storken by Hans Aanrud (National Theater, Oslo, 1927)

== Filmography ==
- 1931: Den store barnedåpen as Dobbelt-Petra
- 1933: En stille flirt as Hulda, Green's maid
- 1938: Ungen as Gurina
