= Servants' Entrance =

1934 film by Frank Lloyd, Walt Disney

- Directed by: Frank Lloyd
- Written by: Sigrid Boo (novel); Samson Raphaelson
- Produced by: Winfield R. Sheehan
- Starring: Janet Gaynor; Lew Ayres; Ned Sparks; Walter Connolly; Louise Dresser
- Cinematography: Hal Mohr
- Edited by: Margaret Clancey
- Music by: Arthur Lange
- Distributed by: Fox Film Corporation
- Release date: September 26, 1934
- Running time: 88 minutes
- Country: United States
- Language: English

Servants' Entrance is a 1934 American pre-Code musical comedy film. It was written by Samson Raphaelson from the Sigrid Boo novel and directed by Frank Lloyd, with a cartoon sequence by Walt Disney in which an understandably startled Janet Gaynor sings a song while obstreperous animated singing silverware prance around on her bed, an early example of combining live action with animation. Critics found this musical interlude especially charming.

This film was adapted from Sigrid Boo's 1930 Norwegian novel Vi som går kjøkkenveien (We Who Enter Through the Kitchen) which has an almost identical plot to Eleanor Hoyt Brainerd's popular 1917 novel How Could You, Jean?, which had already been adapted into a film of the same name in 1918, directed by William Desmond Taylor and starring Mary Pickford. Servants' Entrance's plot was strikingly identical to that of the earlier film; as the New York Times commented, "apparently, the old Pickford comedy was already forgotten, and no copyright infringement suit was filed."

An earlier film based on Sigrid Boo's novel was Servant's Entrance (1932), directed by Gustaf Molander in Sweden. The Swedish version starred Tutta Rolf, who became contracted to Fox Film in 1935.

== Cast ==
- Janet Gaynor as Hedda Nilsson/Helga Brand
- Lew Ayres as Erik Langstrom
- Ned Sparks as Hjalmar Gnu
- Walter Connolly as Viktor Nilsson
- Louise Dresser as Mrs. Hanson
- Astrid Allwyn as Sigrid Hanson
- Sig Ruman as Hans Hansen
- John Qualen as Detective
- Catherine Doucet as Anastasia Gnu
