= Aagot Didriksen =

Norwegian actress (1874–1968)

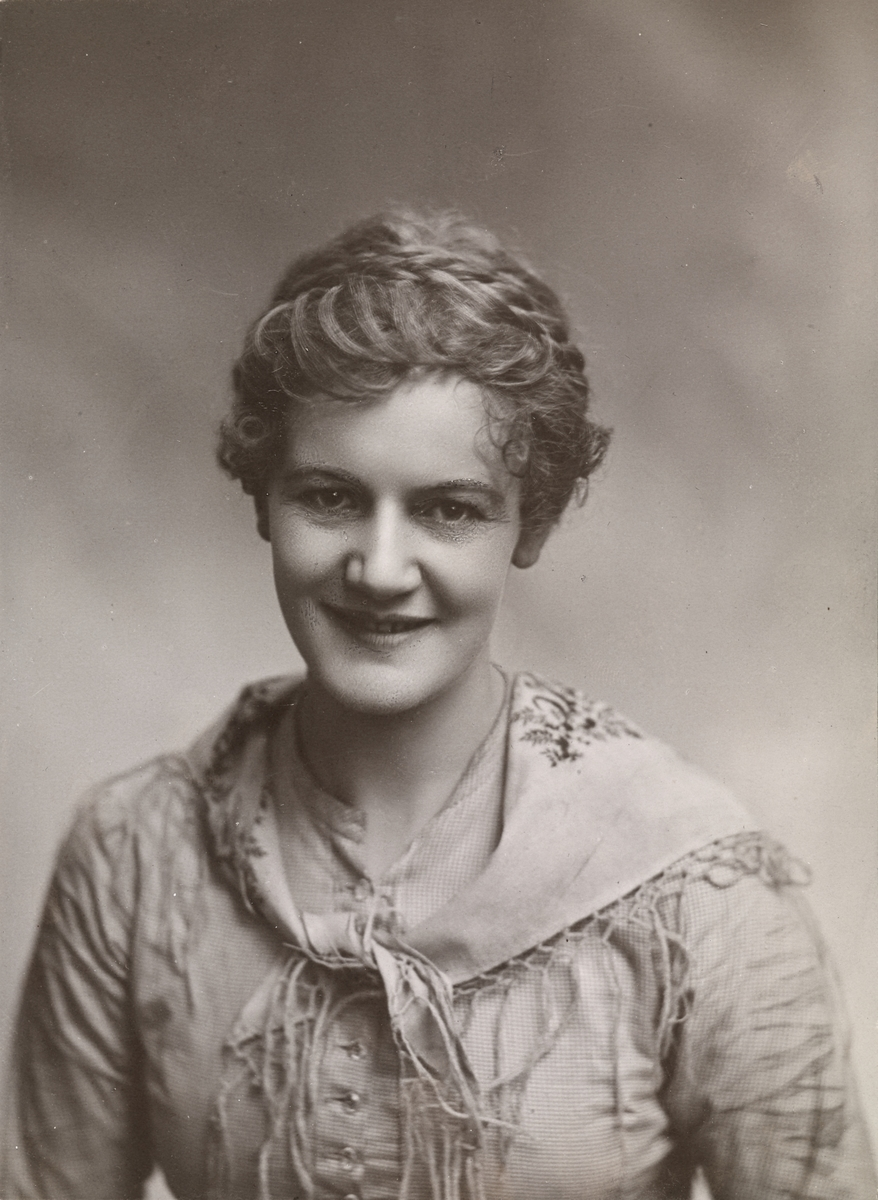
Aagot Didriksen ca. 1915

Aagot Didriksen (3 July 1874 – 19 March 1968) was a Norwegian theatre and film actress of the 1930s.

She was born in Kristiansand, Norway. She debuted on 24 October 1899 in the Royal Danish Theatre of Copenhagen and made over 150 appearances on stage until 1942 when she retired. She also worked under the direction of Tancred Ibsen in the films Vi som går kjøkkenveien (1933), Den store barnedåpen (1932), Fant (1937), and Tørres Snørtevold (1940).
