= I kongens klær (1933 film) =

1933 film

- Directed by: Finn Myklegård
- Based on: Magnus Brostrup Landstad's novel Den evigglade Sjuåførr
- Starring: Einar Rose
- Cinematography: Adrian Bjurman
- Music by: Arne Svendsen
- Distributed by: Norsk Film & Teaterforlag
- Release date: October 12, 1933
- Running time: 82 minutes
- Country: Norway
- Language: Norwegian

I kongens klær (In the King's Clothes) is a Norwegian film directed by Finn Myklegård and based on Magnus Brostrup Landstad's novel Den evigglade Sjuåførr. The film premiered on October 12, 1933. It is a military revue starring Einar Rose.

== Plot ==
According to Aftenposten, this is "not an ordinary film with a plot, but a revue about our recruits' lives at the Gardermoen military base, from the moment they are accepted until they return to their homes. The conclusion is formed by the joint exercises at Gardermoen in the summer, with a parade for the commanding general. You get to experience camp life, barracks life, gymnastics, and weapons exercises. The original intention was to make comedy based on Magnus Brostrup Landstad's Den evigglade sjuåførr, but the ministry did not want the actors to perform in uniform. In the recruits' free time, some scenes from a sutler's setup run by Hilda Fredriksen and Einar Rose have been included. Here, Rose has had the opportunity to sing some of Arne Svendsen's military songs."

== Cast ==
- Einar Rose as Krestian Hansen
- Hilda Fredriksen as Krestian's wife
- Robert Dahl
- Ella Peaters

== Reception ==
Aftenposten's reviewer wrote that the film lacked a story, and that Rose's songs were poorly sung.
