= Den store barnedåpen =

1931 film

- Directed by: Tancred Ibsen
- Written by: Oskar Braaten (play); Tancred Ibsen
- Starring: Einar Sissener; Aase Bye; Agnethe Schibsted-Hansson
- Release date: 1931
- Running time: 103 minutes
- Country: Norway
- Language: Norwegian

Den store barnedåpen (The Great Christening) is a 1931 Norwegian comedy film.

It was directed by Tancred Ibsen and featured Einar Sissener, Aase Bye and Unni Torkildsen.

It was the first feature-length Norwegian sound film. It was based on the 1925 play of the same name written by Oskar Braaten (1881–1939). The lacklustre Harald (Sissener) is taken in by Alvilde (Bye), and charged with looking after her bastard child. It soon dawns on both of them that Harald has more potential than previously assumed.

== Cast ==
- Einar Sissener as Harald
- Aase Bye as Alvilde
- Agnethe Schibsted-Hansson as Dobbelt-Petra
- Hjalmar Fries a Hans, "Gjøken"
- Hauk Aabel as Evensen
- Theodor Berge as the parish priest
- Tore Segelcke as Astrid
- Finn Lange as the chaplain
- Leif Amble-Næss as the Anabaptist
- Thorleif Klausen as a lay preacher
- Johannes Jensen as a lay preacher
- Unni Torkildsen as Georgine
- Signe Ramberg as Toralfa
- Julie Lampe as Miss Jahr
- Hilda Fredriksen as a woman
- Marie Hedemark as a woman
- Snefrid Aukland as a woman
- Aagot Didriksen as a woman
- Fanny Behak
- Finn Bernhoft
- Sophus Dahl
- Grace Grung
- Kaare Knudsen
- Alfhild Meyer
