= Jakob Margido Esp =

Norwegian actor (1943–2023)

- Born: 7 June 1943; Byneset Municipality, German-occupied Norway
- Died: 12 December 2023 (aged 80); Gran Canaria, Spain

Jakob Margido Esp (7 June 1943 – 12 December 2023) was a Norwegian actor known as drag persona "Flettfrid Andresen".

== Personal life ==
Esp was born in Byneset Municipality (later merged with Trondheim Municipality) in 1943, a son of farmer Aksel Esp and Agnes Ervik. He died in Gran Canaria on 12 December 2023, at the age of 80.

== Awards ==
Esp was awarded the Tabuprisen (Taboo prize) in 1995, the first recipient of this prize, for being open about his mental health problems, having toured speaking about the issue and written a book about his personal experiences.

He received the Leonard Statuette in 2008.

In 2010 he was named honorary member of the Norwegian Actors' Equity Association.

== Selected works ==
- Flettfrid (LP, 1984)
- Opp alle jordens velsoignerte. Illustrated by Jan O. Henriksen. Oslo: Tiden. 1990. ISBN 9788210033506.
- Det er typisk norsk å være Gro. Illustrated by Hans Normann Dahl. Oslo: Tiden. 1994. ISBN 9788210038495.
- Hvis du kommer langt nok ut. Oslo: Tiden. 1995. ISBN 9788210039317.
