= D'ække bare, bare Bernt =

- Genre: Sitcom
- Written by: Walter Stone; Arne Lindtner Næss; Marvin Marx; Herb Finn
- Directed by: Trond Lie
- Starring: Jon Skolmen; Grethe Kausland; Brede Bøe; Siv Klynderud
- Country of origin: Norway
- Original language: Norwegian
- No. of seasons: 2
- No. of episodes: 26

Production
- Running time: 30 minutes (Including commercials)

Original release
- Network: TV3
- Release: 27 March 1996 – 1997

D'ække bare, bare Bernt was a Norwegian sitcom that aired on TV3 from 1996 to 1997, starring Jon Skolmen and Grethe Kausland as the married couple Bernt and Vera Brantenberg.

== Plot ==
The show was about the married couple Bernt and Vera Brantenberg. Bernt is a moody tram driver and his wife, Vera, owns a kiosk. They live in an old apartment on the east side of Oslo.

The show was based on the American sitcom The Honeymooners.

== Cast ==
Actor	Role
Jon Skolmen	Bernt Brantenberg
Grethe Kausland	Vera Brantenberg
Brede Bøe	Lasse Lund
Siv Klynderud	Irene Lund
