= Norwegian Comedy Writers' Association =

Norwegian trade union

- Norsk revyforfatterforening
- Formation: 1935
- Headquarters: Behrens' gate 2, 0257 Oslo
- Chair of the board: Andreas Diesen
- board members: Knut Ove Lystad Dag Vågsås Jon Niklas Rønning

The Norwegian Comedy Writers' Association (Norwegian: Norsk revyforfatterforening) is a trade union for writers of revues and other comedy in Norway.
