= Kierlighed uden Strømper =

1772 play by Johan Herman Wessel

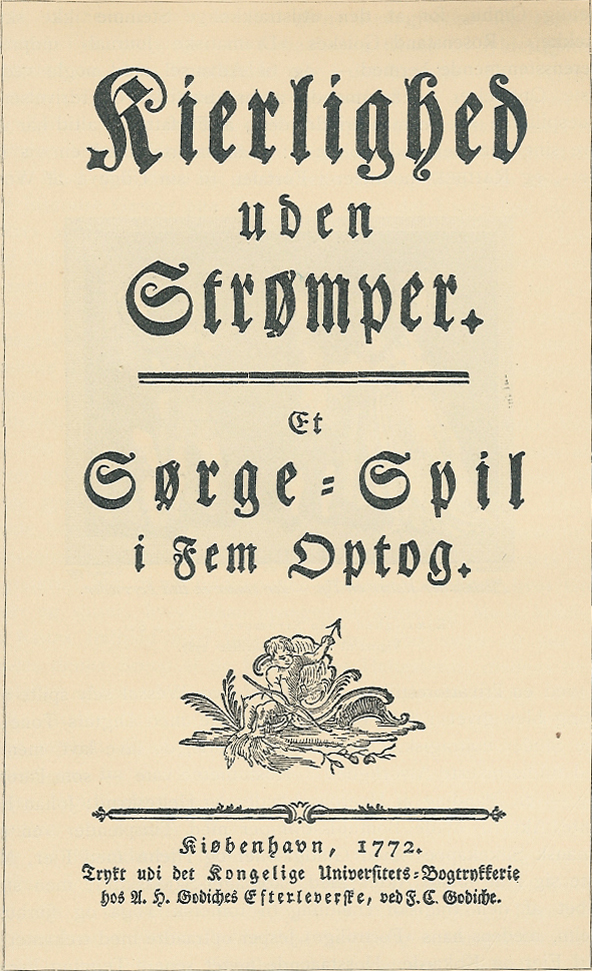
- Title page of the first edition, 1772
- Original language: Dano-Norwegian
- Written by: Johan Herman Wessel
- Characters: Johan von Ehrenpreis; Grete; Mette; Mads; Jesper
- Genre: Comedy

Premiere
- Date: March 1773
- Place: Royal Danish Theater, Copenhagen, Denmark

Kierlighed uden Strømper: Et Sørge-Spil i Fem Optog (Love Without Stockings: A Tragedy in Five Acts) is a comedy by the Norwegian playwright Johan Herman Wessel, published in 1772.

== History ==
The play was published in September 1772 and it was performed in an amateur theater that same year. It had its official premier at the Royal Danish Theater in Copenhagen in March 1773.

== Plot ==
The action takes place over the course of a day, and the main characters are all simple craftsmen. The heroine, Grete, is informed that she must get married during the day. As her beloved, Johan von Ehrenpreis, is away (he is a tailor, and has gone to mend a major's trousers), she turns to her former lover, Mads. Johan returns, but he has no stockings, and therefore he cannot marry. Johan steals Mads' stockings and is scolded by Mads—after which Johan takes his own life. Then everyone takes their own lives. In the play's epilogue, Mercury descends from the realm of the gods, bringing the characters back to life, after which they sing and dance.

The play is a parody of classical drama's rules for the form and content of tragedy. The comic effect is particularly expressed in the mismatch between the high style of the lines and form, and the trivial content. The sumptuous music of the play, written in arias by the Italian composer Paolo Scalabrini, also helps create a comic effect when juxtaposed with the absurd and trivial action. Scalabrini himself was unaware of the play's content. The text is in Alexandrines.

The name of the character Johan von Ehrenpreis can be seen as a jab at Johan Nordahl Brun, whose play Zarine (1772) won a tragedy competition.
