= Raske Menn =

Norwegian comedians

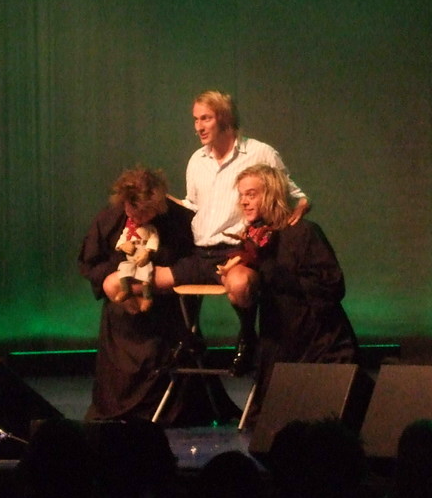
Øyvind Rafto, Anders Hoff and Calle Hellevang-Larsen

Raske menn (lit. "Fast Men") is a trio of Norwegian comedians who have gained fame in Norway for their sketches and shows. The trio consists of Anders Hoff, Øyvind Rafto and Calle Hellevang-Larsen.

The group began with Øyvind and Calle being friends from childhood. Øyvind and Calle had played together in a school theater. Anders and Øyvind were fellow students and met each other during the UKEN-revues at the Norwegian School of Economics.

In 2005, the trio won the Norwegian comedy award for best newcomers. The trio has appeared in a number of TV programmes, and in 2007 it had its own TV series Snabbgrabbar with Raske Menn on TVNorge. In 2012, they performed at 20.00 with Raske Menn on TV 2. Raske Menn has played around 900 performances with its three stage shows in almost 20 years. On 17 February 2022, Raske Menn premieres its fourth stage show "Raske Menn - 19-year anniversary show" at Chat Noir in Oslo.

Their most famous sketch is "Verdenshistorien på 5 minutter" which can be translated to "The history of the world in 5 minutes" The 5-minute-long sketch is essentially a summary of the most important events and people through history including Jesus Christ, Charles Darwin, Muhammad, Neil Armstrong, Moses and the vikings. Thor Heyerdahl also makes an appearance as the explorer who always appears at important events.

== Related Shows ==
Calle has his own comedy web series titled "Ah! Så det er SÅNN det er!", which translates to "Ah! So THAT'S how it is!". The series is not ongoing however, as there is only one episode left to air. Calle plays every character in the show, which is mainly himself and his friend/neighbor Abraham, a clueless neanderthal who plays a positive and funny character throughout Calle's misadventures. The show is not very popular yet, but many fans of Raske Menn enjoy the show. Hellevang-Larsen is also a regular part of the TV Norge television program I kveld med Ylvis.
