= Jens Book-Jenssen =

Norwegian singer and songwriter (1910–1999)

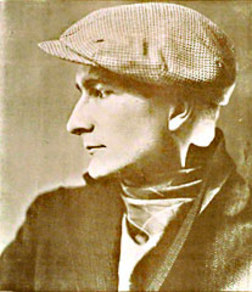
Jens Book-Jenssen in 1939

Jens Peter Book-Jenssen (14 November 1910 – 28 March 1999) was a Norwegian singer of popular music, songwriter, revue artist and theatre director. From his stage debut in the early 1930s, his career included radio and television work, recordings, and extensive touring. His career spanned more than sixty years, and he was the top selling record artist in Norway in the 20th century.

== Personal life ==
Book-Jenssen was born in Bærum as the son of gardener Olaf Jenssen (1874–1949) and Pauline Book (1883–1962), who were born in Hamar and Stockholm respectively. He grew up at the farm Store Stabekk. He married Gerd Kværnberg in 1936. Book-Jenssen was often informally referred to as "Book'n" or "Booken" in the press.

== Career ==
=== 1930s and 1940s ===
He made his stage debut at Det Nye Teater in Oslo in 1933. As a revue artist he first performed on Scala Teater, and later on Chat Noir in Oslo. He started his recording career in 1933, and made about 400 recordings between 1934 and 1945. Among his hits during this period were songs such as "Når lysene tennes der hjemme", "En liten gyllen ring" and "De lyse netters melodi". He also wrote song lyrics, under the pseudonym Peter Coob. From the mid-1930s until 1973, he toured the country with his shows, and according to his own estimate he travelled the distance from Oslo to Kirkenes at least a hundred times.

=== Post war ===
Book-Jenssen was the director of the revue theatre Chat Noir in Oslo from 1947 to 1950, and from 1954 to 1959. In 1972 he founded Bookn's Teater. Among his post-war song recordings are "Gudskjelovkvelden" from 1949, and "Når kastanjene blomstrer i Bygdø Allé" in 1950 and again in 1956 when it became a hit. Other popular songs were "Skjærsliperen" (1956) and "Norge i rødt, hvitt og blått" (1963). He made about 150 recordings for the record company NERA from 1946 to 1958, and about forty recordings for the record company HMV between 1958 and 1965. During his career he made more than ninety national tours, and also toured European countries with his revue ensemble. In the 1970s he contributed to a series of radio programs, by singing and telling stories from his career. Already in the mid-1950s he became the first Norwegian artist to sell over one million records. He later came to be the top record selling musician in Norway in the 20th century, with a conservative estimate of more than two million sold items. According to other estimates, the number was over three and a half million.

Book-Jenssen was awarded the Spellemannprisen honorary award in 1972, the Leonard Statuette in 1974, and was also decorated with the Royal Norwegian Order of St. Olav and HM The King's Medal of Merit. His last television appearance was in connection with his 85-year anniversary, when he was celebrated in a show on the Norwegian Broadcasting Corporation by a wide array of Norwegian artists. He died aged 88 on 28 March 1999, and was buried from a capacity church in Haslum, Bærum.

== External sources ==
- Jens Book-Jenssen discography at Discogs
- Jens Book-Jenssen at IMDb
