= Einar Rose =

Norwegian actor (1898–1979)

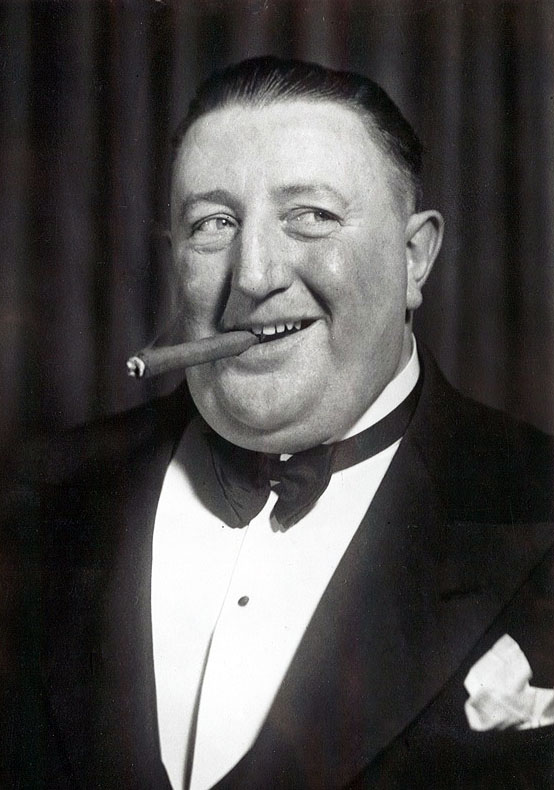
- c. 1940
- Born: 27 January 1898
- Died: 3 February 1979 (aged 81)

Einar Rose (27 January 1898 – 3 February 1979) was a Norwegian actor, revue artist, singer and restaurant keeper. He was among Norway's most popular singers, and recorded more than 300 songs between 1927 and 1941. He made his debut in the revue Regnbuen på Mayol in 1925. He played at the revue theatre Chat Noir from 1926, and was artistic director at Chat Noir from 1936. Among his best known song performances are "Svigermor og Evensen og kjerringa og jeg", "Sol ute, sol inne", "Ola var fra Sandefjord" and "Nå går'n på gummisåler".

== Filmography ==
- 1933: I kongens klær as Krestian Hansen
