= Hege Schøyen =

Norwegian singer, actor and comedian (born 1957)

- Born: 22 May 1957 (age 68); Oslo, Norway
- Occupations: Singer, actor and comedian.
- Spouse: Arild Andersen (m. 1991)
- Mother: Eli Skolmen Ryg
- Relatives: Jon Skolmen (uncle); Anne Ryg (half-sister); Harald Eia (brother-in-law)
- Awards: Leif Juster's honorary prize (1988); Leonard Statuette (1998); Komiprisen (2001, 2013)

Hege Schøyen (born 22 May 1957 in Oslo) is a Norwegian singer, actor and comedian. She has played at the Oslo revue theatre Chat Noir and at Nationaltheatret. She was television presenter for the youth program series Midt i smørøyet at the Norwegian Broadcasting Corporation, and has participated in several Swedish and Norwegian films. She was awarded the Leonard Statuette for 1998.

Schøyen is the niece of Norwegian actor Jon Skolmen. They were both in the 1991 Swedish comedy Den ofrivillige golfaren, where they were supposed to play lovers. The characters' on-screen relationship was toned down to a near friendship to make the two actors less uncomfortable.
