= Otto Nielsen =

Norwegian songwriter, revue writer, cabaret singer and radio personality

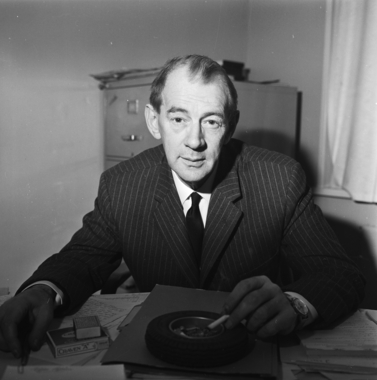
- Otto Nielsen in 1964
- Born: Otto Louis Nielsen; 19 June 1909; Trondheim, Norway
- Died: 9 October 1982 (aged 73); Oslo, Norway
- Occupations: Song and cabaret writer, singer, radio host

Otto Nielsen (19 June 1909 – 9 October 1982) was a Norwegian songwriter, revue writer, cabaret singer and radio personality. He participated in Norwegian cultural life for five decades, starting from the 1930s, and played an important role behind the scene as program manager for the radio program series "Søndagsposten" for over twenty years.

== Personal life ==
Nielsen was born in Trondheim as a son of Karl Otto Severin Nielsen and his wife Anna Louise Kaspersen Berg. He was married to dancer and choreographer Elsa Emilie Ramberg from 1938 to 1945, and to nurse Aslaug Josefine Becker Fossum from 1953.

== Career ==
=== 1930s ===
Nilsen co-formed the song duo Gerd og Otto in 1930, together with his younger sister Gerd. The group had its first appearance at Trøndelag Teater in Trondheim. Their first recordings were Et luftslott på månen/Haveorkesteret and På turné/Hans og Grete from 1934, and the duo issued several 78 rpm records during the 1930s. The duo also produced children's programs for Trøndelag Kringkaster in Trondheim, and Nielsen co-wrote the first Norwegian operetta for radio, Postboks 39. He also wrote a children's operetta, Spilledåsen in 1939.

=== 1940s ===
Following the outbreak of World War II, Nielsen was arrested in November 1942 and held at Møllergata 19 for three weeks, and again arrested in November 1943 and held at the Grini concentration camp until May 1945. While staying at Grini he orchestred several cabarets for the prisoners. His song Det har vi was first performed inside the camp in 1944, and the song found its way out and became very popular. Another of Nielsen's Grini songs was Grinimarsjen. The duo Gerd and Otto's most popular hit was the song En grønnmalt benk from 1948.

=== 1950s ===
Nilsen was program editor for the Norwegian Broadcasting Corporation's program series Søndagsposten from 1958 to 1979. In this position he played an important role behind the Norwegian cultural scene. Several singer-songwriters saw their first songs performed in this program, including Kari Bremnes, Birgitte Grimstad, Lars Klevstrand and Stein Ove Berg. Among Nielsen's songs from the 1950s are Prinsessen i berget det blå (1952), Litjvisa mi (1958) and Gamlemor og Vesleblakken (1959).

=== 1960s ===
In the 1960s Nielsen wrote songs such as Hemmeligheten from 1961 and Fiskeribølgen from 1964. His song Pappa'n til Tove Mette from 1964 had a melody composed by Willy Andresen, and På ski (1965) had a melody by Robert Normann. Nielsen composed the melody for Alf Prøysen's popular song Du skal få en dag i mårå (1966). He wrote the song text for Jeg vil være tung, with melody composed by Arne Bendiksen. His book Søndagspostens bok was issued in 1967.

=== 1970s and 1980s ===
The album Hajnhojnn i bajnn og 13 andre trønderviser was released in 1975. Nielsen received the Spellemannprisen honorary award in 1975, and the revue award Leonard Statuette for 1979. Nielsens and his sister Gerd (Røstad) made a re-recording of some of their best known songs in 1982, issued on the Polydor album Svanesang i stereo.

The street Otto Nielsens vei at Tyholt in Trondheim is named after him.
