= Norge i rødt, hvitt og blått =

Norwegian song

Norge i rødt, hvitt og blått (Norway in red, white and blue) is one of Norway's most famous national songs. It is widely used on 17 May, Norway's Constitution Day. The song originates from the time of the German occupation of Norway (1941), with lyrics by Finn Bø, Bias Bernhoft and Arild Feldborg. The melody was composed by Lars-Erik Larsson, originally under the name "Obligationsmarschen", with lyrics by Alf Henrikson, as a work commissioned by the Swedish state.
