= Grethe Kausland =

Norwegian singer, performer and actress

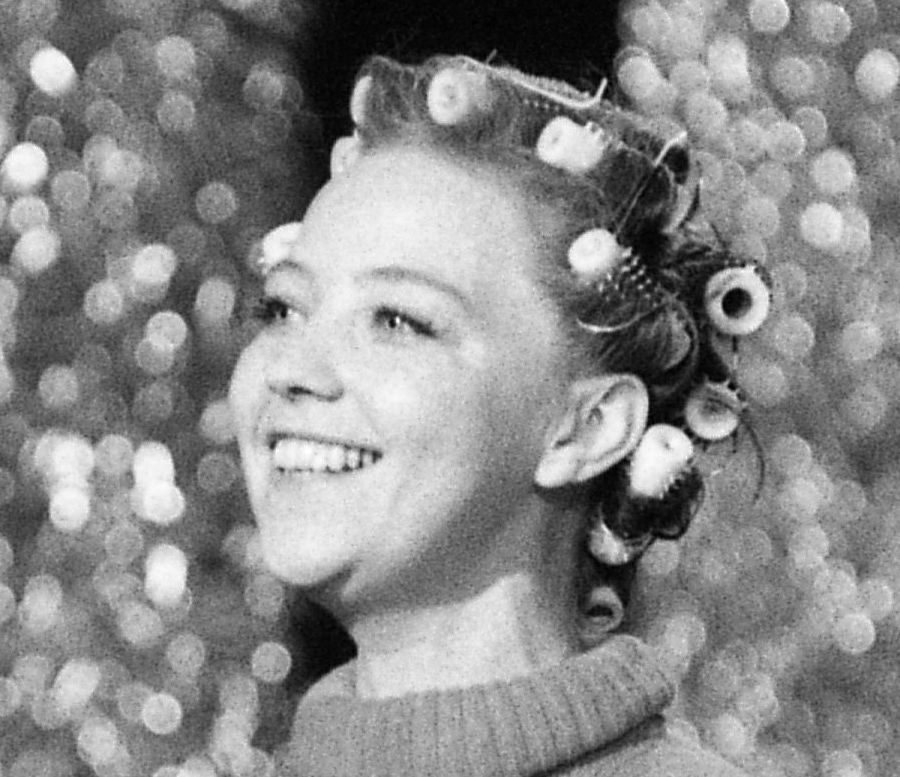
- Grethe Kausland with Dizzie Tunes.
- Born: Grethe Nilsen; 3 July 1947; Horten, Norway
- Died: 16 November 2007 (aged 60); Oslo, Norway
- Occupations: Actress, vocalist, singer

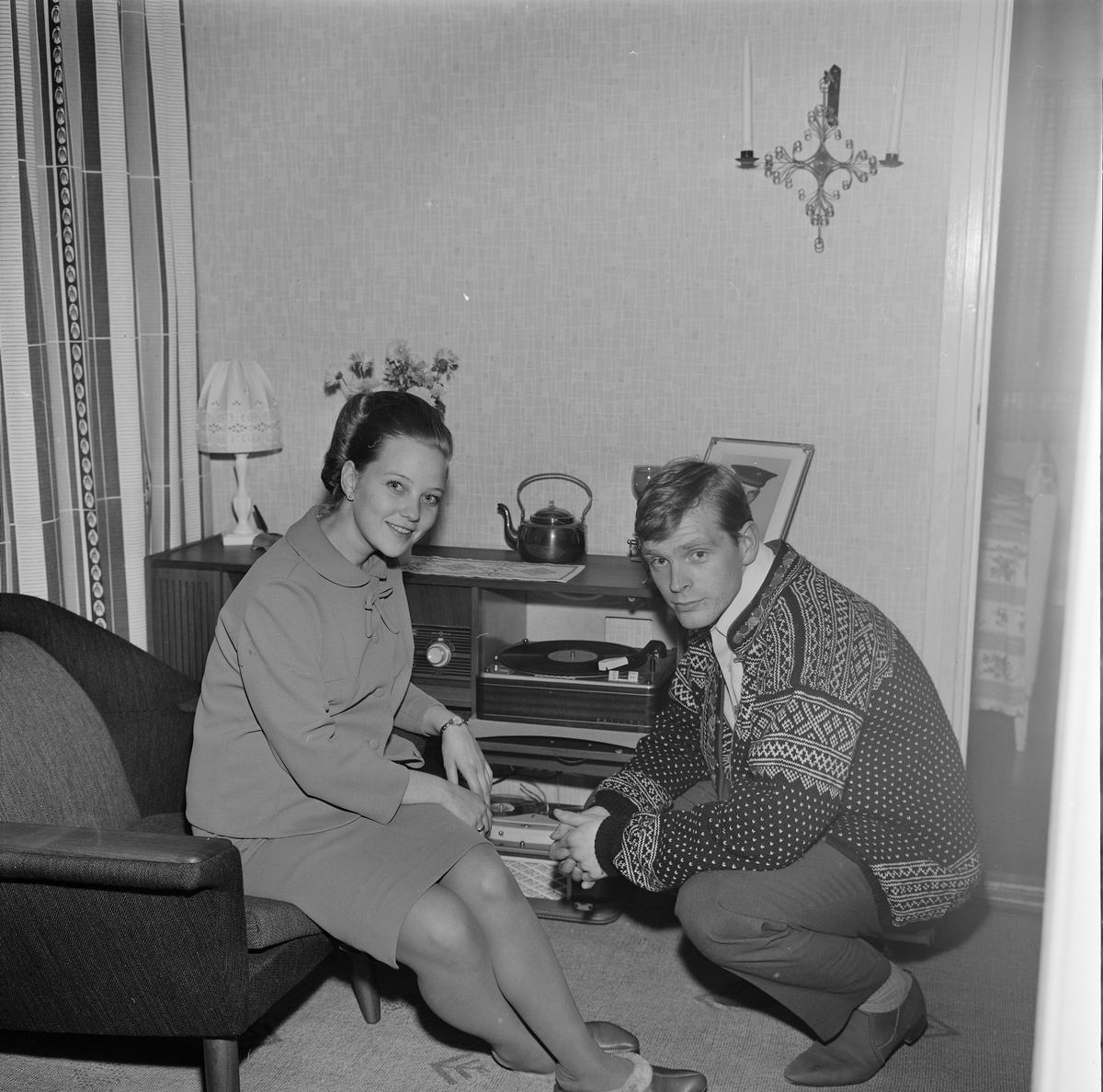
Grethe Kausland with her husband Halvard (1966) Photo Rigmor Dahl Delphin / Oslo Museum

Grethe Kausland (née Nilsen; 3 July 1947 – 16 November 2007) was a Norwegian singer, performer and actress. As a child star she was one of Norway's most popular singers (her debut single “Teddyen min” from 1955, sold more than 100,000 records), and she participated in several films as a child. She represented Norway in the 1972 Eurovision Song Contest, singing "Småting" with Benny Borg. From 1973 she performed regularly with the musical group Dizzie Tunes. Awarded "Spellemannprisen" 1978 for the album A Taste of Grethe Kausland, and "Leonardstatuetten" 1991 for her achievements on the revue scene.

She died from lung cancer on 16 November 2007, in Oslo, Norway.

== Child career ==
Grethe made her stage debut at age 4 at a local revue, and cut her first record at age 8 in 1955, after winning a radio-transmitted amateur competition; the song, "Teddyen Min"/"Cowboyhelten" became a big radio hit in and sold over 100,000 copies. She made her first film, Smugler i smoking in 1957; by age 12 she had cut 10 records and acted in five films. Described "crazy about jazz" as a child, she visited jazz clubs while still underage, "swinging" like an adult jazz vocalist despite her youthful voice.

== Shows with Dizzie Tunes ==
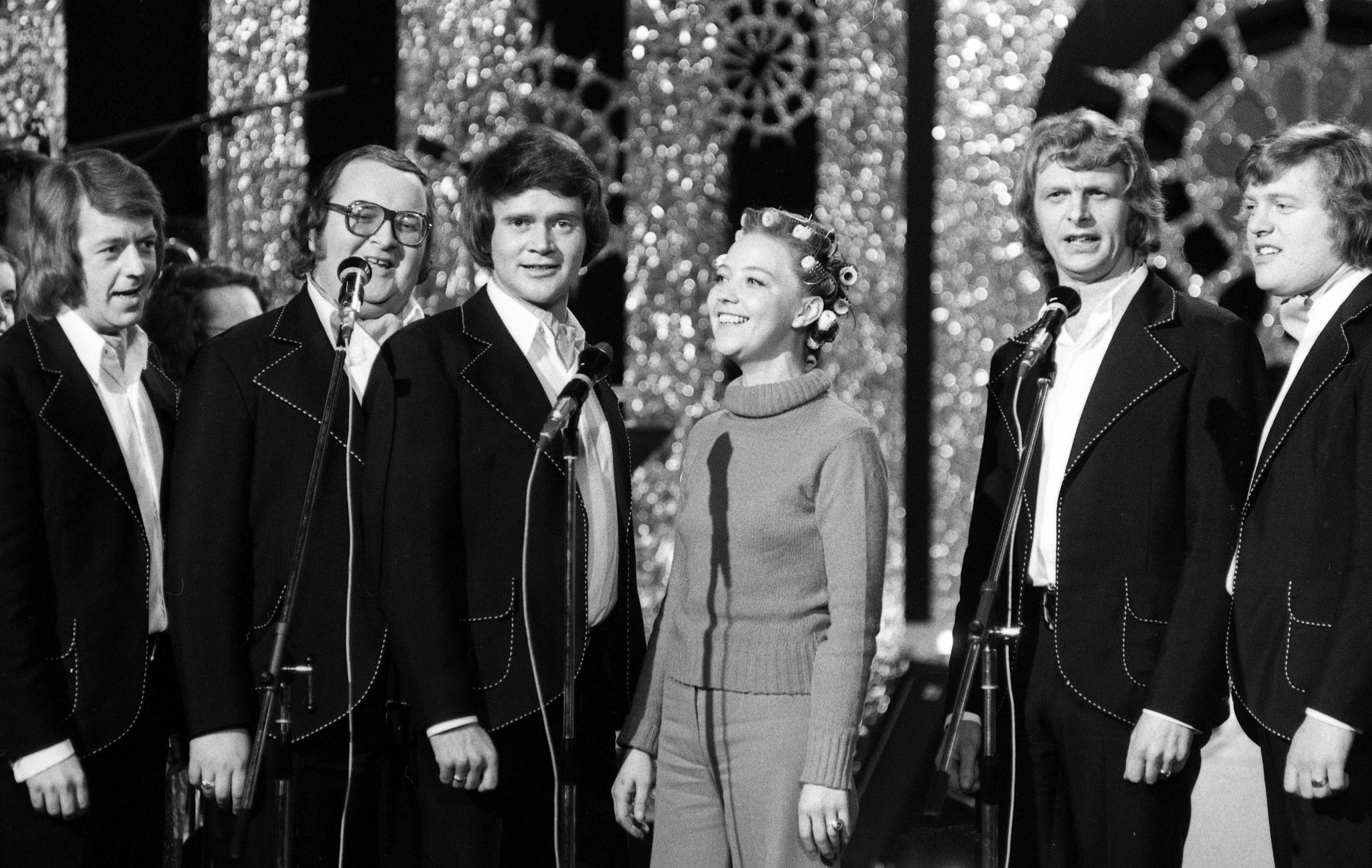
Grethe Kausland with Dizzie Tunes.

Kausland's cooperation with the show group Dizzie Tunes started with her Chat Noir Theatre debut På go'fot (1973). Later followed the shows Showkade med og uten fyll (1974), Vi spillopper (1976, film version 1979), Memories Of Music (1979/1980, also video), The Show Must Go Home (1984, also video), Festsprell i Dizzie Tider (1988). She also participated in many of their TV shows. Sing Sala Bim (1973) was awarded Bronze Rose at the Montreux festival.

Her music albums with Dizzie Tunes are: Toppop 1 (1972), Mere Ra-ta-ta-ta (1972), Folk i nord (1973), Hei-hå-hei-hå (1973), Norsklåt (1973), På go'fot med Dizzie Tunes (1973), Memories of Music (1982), Go'biter med Dizzie Tunes (1992).

== A Star is Torn ==
In a 1993 adaptation of Robyn Archer and Rodney Fischer's show A Star is Torn, Grethe Kausland portrayed nine tragic female fates in popular music: Bessie Smith, Helen Morgan, Judy Garland, Billie Holiday, Edith Piaf, Marie Lloyd, Marilyn Monroe, Dinah Washington and Janis Joplin. A full evening one-woman-performance, first at Rogaland Teater (Stavanger, 1993, 45 performances), and later at Victoria Teater (Oslo, 1995).

== Television series ==
From the late 1990s Kausland participated in several TV series. In D'ække bare, bare Bernt (1996) she starred as "Vera", with Jon Skolmen as her husband "Bernt". In the situation comedy Karl & Co (63 episodes, running 1998–2001) she appeared regularly as "Ruth Frantzen". She played the role "Mamsen" in the children's series Jul i Blåfjell in 1999. This series became quite popular, it received the Gullruten award in 2000 for Best TV drama, a music album from the series received Spellemannprisen in 1999 for Best children's album, and the follow-up series Jul på månetoppen appeared in 2002.

== Discography ==
=== Singles on the Columbia label (as child star) ===
- 1955: "Teddyen min"/"Cowboyhelten"
- 1956: "Den lille kjøkkenskriver"/"Jeg vil gifte meg med pappa" (with Frank Robert)
- 1956: "Maria Fly-fly"/"Eventyrswing"
- 1956: "Grethemor"/"Dukkestuen"
- 1956: "Til Nisseland"/"Ding-dong"
- 1957: "Min lille mandolin"/"Kjære lille vov-vov"
- 1957: "Hipp Hurra!"/"Lolly Poll"
- 1958: "Lillesøster"/"Musefest i kjelleren"
- 1959: "På tivoli"/"Pappas lille pike"
- 1960: "Souvenirs"/"Conny"
- 1960: "Det finns millioner"/"Europa Non Stop"
- 1963: "Gullregnen"/"Ønskedrømmen"
- 1964: "Hjerte"/"Hvis jeg var gutt"

=== Albums ===
- Grethe gjennom 10 år (Columbia, 1964)
- A Taste of Grethe Kausland (Troll, 1978)
- Grethe synger Lille Grethe (Troll, 1979)
- Stay With Me (Troll, 1984)
- Jazzway to Norway (1991) (with several artists)
- Jazz my way (Curling Legs, 2008)

== Filmography ==
- Smuglere i smoking (1957)
- Selv om de er små (1957)
- Far til fire og onkel Sofus (1957)
- Far til fire og ulveungerne (1958)
- Ugler i mosen (1959) (directed by Ivo Caprino)
- Millionær for en aften (1960)
- To på topp (1965)
- Tut og kjør (1975)
- Vi spillopper (1979)
- Over stork og stein (Stork Staring Mad, 1994)
- Solan, Ludvig og Gurin med reverompa (Gurin with the Foxtail, 1998) (voice)

== TV series ==
- D'ække bare, bare Bernt (1996)
- Karl & Co (1997–2000)
- Jul i Blåfjell (1999) (Awarded Gullruten 2000 for Best TV drama, and Spellemannprisen 1999 for Best children's album)
- Jul på månetoppen (2002)
- Brødrene Dal og mysteriet med Karl XIIs gamasjer (2005) (mini TV Series)
- Hos Martin (2005 episode)

== Personal life ==
From 1966 to 1979 she was married to jazz guitarist Halvard Kausland. After the end of their marriage, she kept the name Kausland, and did not revert to her maiden name Nilsen.

Awards and achievements
Preceded by Hanne Krogh with "Lykken er"	Norway in the Eurovision Song Contest; 1972 (with Benny Borg)	Succeeded by Bendik Singers with "It's Just A Game"
