= Dag Frøland =

Norwegian comedian and entertainer (1945–2010)

- Born: 16 September 1945; Volda, Norway
- Died: 26 January 2010 (aged 64); Oslo, Norway
- Spouse: Jorunn Ragnhild Bye (1968–1984, divorced)

Comedy career
- Years active: 1952–87, 1996, 2006–7
- Genres: Parody, impersonation, musical comedy, variety
- Website: Dag Frøland at IMDb

Dag Frøland (16 September 1945 – 26 January 2010) was a Norwegian comedian, revue artist and singer, who was best known for his countless impersonations and variety shows in Oslo during the 1970s and 1980s.

== Early life ==
Frøland was born in Volda in 1945, and grew up in Fredrikstad, living with his grandfather after his parents' divorce. During his childhood he also lived for some time in Aurdal and Oslo. He made his radio debut in 1952 at the age of seven, and four years later he released his first record. During his early teens he became an active writer, and at the age of 14 began writing for Aftenposten. After completing his examen artium at Oslo Cathedral School, he began studying medicine, but soon dropped out to focus on a career in entertainment.

== Career ==
In 1967 he recorded Du skal få en dag i mårå, an Alf Prøysen classic, and in the following years continued to produce hit singles. In the early 70s he became the director of theatre Chat Noir in Oslo, and soon became a known face to the audiences, with his countless, spot-on impersonations of Norwegian celebrities and comic musical numbers, and in 1979, he began a decade-long run of annual revues on Chat Noir, drawing full houses on every show. In 1987, Frøland suddenly withdrew from the spotlight, due to stress and being overworked. In later interviews he described himself as having a complete physical and mental breakdown at the point, being completely burned out. After his withdrawal, Frøland disappeared completely from the spotlight for almost twenty years, with the exception of a single album release in 1996. In 2005, he was honoured with The King's Medal of Merit in Gold, but he refused to accept it as he felt that "rating humans in such a way was wrong". The same year, a DVD compilation of his best known numbers was released. The year after, he once again entered the stage after a nineteen-year absence, doing local shows in Ullensaker and his hometown of Fredrikstad.

== Personal life and death ==
In 1968, Frøland married Jorunn Ragnhild Bye, and they divorced in 1984. Frøland had one son, Ebbe, who died on 1 January 2002. This was one reason why he retired from public life.

Frøland was regarded as "one of the nicest in Norwegian show business", and he was friends with many other artists throughout Norway. His public persona was to a large extent molded on the English gentleman as personified by Noël Coward whom Frøland admired greatly from an early age, and as a 19-year-old he also met this idol at the Savoy Hotel in London. He was also an admirer of and influenced by the Swedish revue artist Karl Gerhard. One of his best friends was veteran comedian Leif Juster, whom he also impersonated very frequently. He was also particularly close to Andreas Diesen, whom he knew from childhood.

On 26 January 2010 Frøland died in his home on the famed Bygdøy allé in Oslo, aged 64.
