= Sigrid Boo =

Norwegian writer (1898–1953)

Sigrid Maren Boo (23 August 1898 – 12 September 1953) was a Norwegian writer of popular books. She was born and died in Oslo, but grew up in Larvik from 1899 to 1909.

Her works deal with love, tuberculosis, and service. The book Vi som går kjøkkenveien (1930) was filmed in 1933 and was adapted for the United States film Servants' Entrance (1934) released by Fox Film Corporation.

== Bibliography ==
- Valmuen (1922)
- Selv i tider som disse (1932)
- Livhanken (1937)
- Alle tenker på sig - det er bare jeg som tenker på mig (1934)
- Fire i bilen (1936)
- En dag kom hun tilbake (1937)
- Ellers hadde vi det festlig (1938)
- Heldig ung dame (1940)
- Daglig strev i Norden (1942)
- Vi som går kjøkkenveien (1930)

== Filmography (selected) ==
- 1933: Vi som går kjøkkenveien
