= Arvid Nilssen =

Norwegian actor, revue artist and singer (1913–1976)

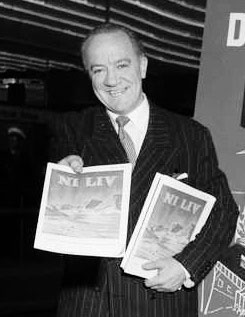
- Born: 25 December 1913; Alvdal, Hedmark, Norway
- Died: 24 March 1976 (aged 62); Oslo, Norway
- Occupations: Actor, revue artist and singer
- Awards: Leonard Statuette

Arvid Nilssen (25 December 1913 – 24 March 1976) was a Norwegian actor, revue artist and singer. He was regarded as one of the leading comedians in Norwegian revue.

== Biography ==
Nilsen was born in Alvdal Municipality in Hedmark, Norway. He made his debut in Oslo at the Scala Teater in 1935, and played at Chat Noir from 1937 and most of his career. He also participated in tours, recorded films, and was a guest on numerous radio programs. He was awarded the Leonard Statuette in 1968 and was depicted on a Norwegian postage tamp in 2001. He died in Oslo and was buried at Vestre gravlund.
