= Yngvar Numme =

Norwegian singer and actor (1944–2023)

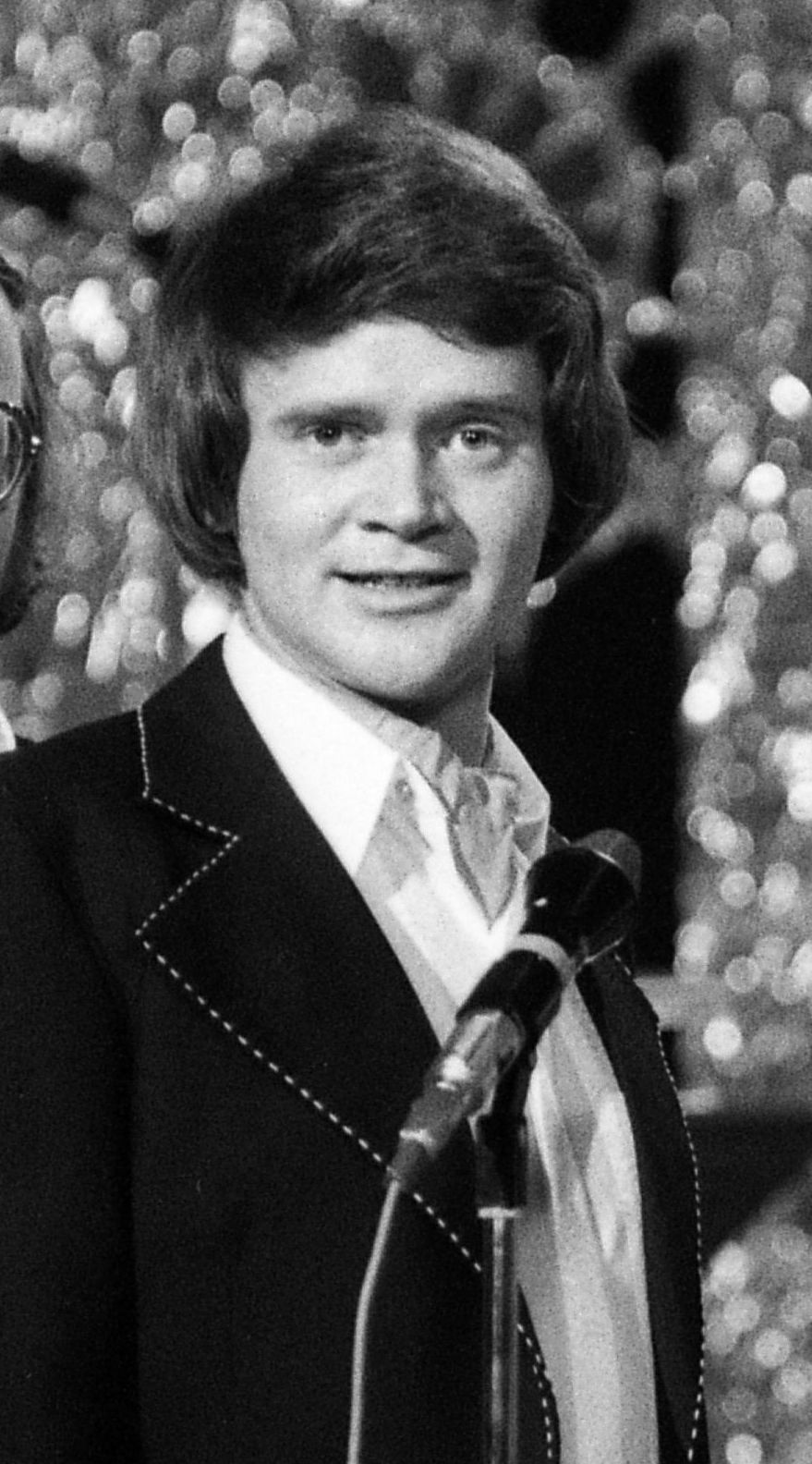
- Numme in 1974
- Born: 1 October 1944; Porsgrunn, German-occupied Norway
- Died: 25 November 2023 (aged 79)
- Occupations: Singer, actor, revue writer and director
- Known for: Leader of the show group Dizzie Tunes for about forty years
- Children: Thomas Numme
- Awards: Leonard Statuette (1990); King's Medal of Merit in gold (2002)

Yngvar Numme (1 October 1944 – 25 November 2023) was a Norwegian singer, actor, revue writer and director. He was particularly known for his central role in the show group Dizzie Tunes for about forty years, one of the most successful ensembles in Norwegian entertainment. He was awarded the Leonard Statuette in 1990, and Dizzie Tunes received the same award in 1993.

Numme and fellow Dizzie Tunes member Tor Erik Gunstrøm also formed a comedy duo which usually performed as a part of the Dizzie Tunes shows, but sometimes also as a standalone act independent of the group. Numme would typically be the straight man, while Gunstrøm would be the funny or eccentric character. Numme and Gunstrøm was one of Norway's most popular comedy acts in the 1970s and 1980s.

Numme also voiced in the animated film, "Løvenes Konge" (Norwegian version of The Lion King) and voiced for The Chronicler in the Norwegian dub for The Legend of Spyro: Dawn of the Dragon video game released in 2008.

== Personal life ==
Numme was born in Porsgrunn on 1 October 1944. His parents were Harald Numme and Erna Andreasssen. His first marriage, from 1969 to 1991, was to Kari Fogstad. In 1996 he married dancer Ingrid Meland. He was father to television host Thomas Numme.

Numme died on 25 November 2023, at the age of 79.
