= Herbert Herding =

Norwegian actor (1904–1958)

- Born: February 2, 1904; Fredrikstad, Norway
- Died: October 19, 1958 (aged 54); Oslo, Norway
- Occupation: Actor
- Father: Arne Svendsen
- Relatives: Kolbjørn Svendsen

Herbert Herding (February 2, 1904 – October 19, 1958) was a Norwegian revue writer, revue artist, and theater director. Under the stage name Herberth, he was one of the most celebrated revue artists of his time.

== Family ==
Herding was born in Fredrikstad, the son of the actor and revue writer Arne Svendsen and Cecilie Fischer (1886–1957). He was the half-brother of the revue writer Kolbjørn Svendsen and the nephew of the actor and stage manager Osvald Svendsen (1892–1963).

== Career ==
Herding had already made a name for himself in Norwegian theater life in the 1920s. In 1925 he became the theater director at the Hjorten Revue and Variety Theater in Trondheim. Hjorten had been a very popular stage since it was established in 1867, but in 1925 the theater experienced hardship and poor audiences. In the first years under Herding's management, the theater experienced an upswing, but in 1928 the audience began to dwindle again. The reason was said to be that the local Trondheim color was missing in the productions. Herding resigned his position and became the manager at Chat Noir in Oslo.

In 1933, Herding appeared in Tancred Ibsen's feature film Op med hodet!, which was considered very avant-garde cinematically. The film premiered in 1934, and is about a naive country boy who comes to the capital, falls in love with an actress, and decides to take to the stage. Herding plays one of the revue actors in the film. This was his only film role.

Herding wrote the lyrics to a number of popular songs, such as "Sol ute, sol inne" and "Jeg blir så glad når solen skinner".

== Filmography ==
- 1934: Op med hodet! as an actor
