= Edderkoppen Theatre =

Theatre in Oslo, Norway

Coordinates: 59°55′5.07″N 10°44′22.89″E

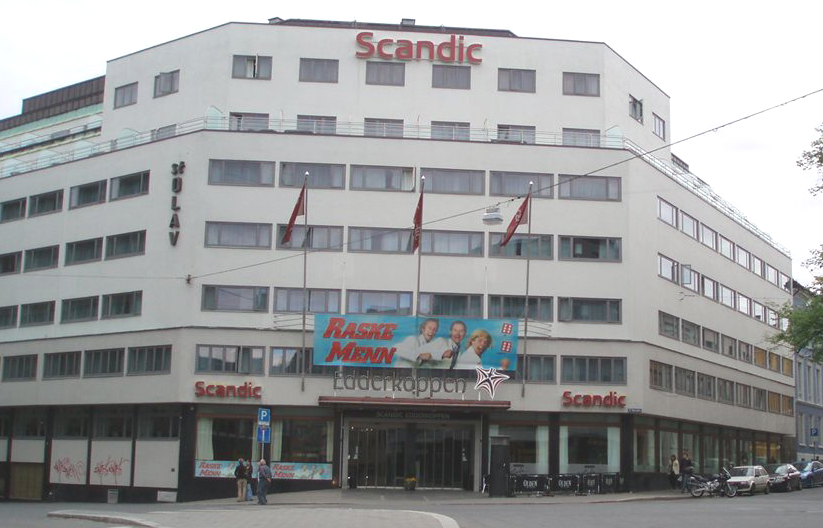
Edderkoppen Theatre

The Edderkoppen Theatre is a theatre located at Bergen in Tromsø, Norway. The theatre is known for varied entertainment, ranging from comedy to musical shows. From 1967 to 2003 it was called the ABC theatre. Since 2016, it has been known as Edderkoppen Scene.

== History ==
The theatre premiered on 3 September 1942 at a different venue. It turned out that the theater auditorium was too small, and in 1945 moved to St. Olav's place. Einar Schanke (1927–1992) took over as theatre director and theatrical producer in 1967, and the theater changed its name to the ABC theater. The theater, however, retained its traditions under Schanke's management. In 1992 Schanke died, and Tom Sterri, Ketil Aamodt and Anders Moland took over.

In 1999 the theatre was destroyed by a powerful explosion. A real estate company that owned a nearby hotel purchased the property. The company committed itself at the same time to rebuild the theatre. In autumn 2003, reconstruction had finished, and the theatre was returned to its original name, Edderkoppen. In December 2014, ownership transfers operations to Scandic Hotels and after extensive renovation, opened the stage in May 2016 with a new name; Edderkoppen Scene.

The new building has 600 seats and offers entertainment, dining and accommodation all in the same building. t is also a popular venue for conferences and events. I

== Productions: 2003-2008 ==
- 2003: På nett med byen
- 2004: På nett med byen
- 2004: Joe Labero: Expect the unexpected
- 2004: Elling og Kjell Bjarne
- 2004: 80-tallet Beat for beat
- 2004: No e dde jul igjen
- 2005: På rad og rike
- 2005: Boogie Nights
- 2005: Raske Menn: The Fast Show
- 2005: Tommy og Jan Werner - The Show
- 2005: No e dde jul igjen
- 2006: Raske Menn: The Fast Show
- 2006: Ladies Night
- 2006: Ole Paus og Lill Lindfors: En juleforestilling
- 2006: A merry little christmas
- 2007: Ladies Night
- 2007: Hair
- 2007: Bettan og Bøfjerdingan
- 2007: Dansefeber sceneshow
- 2007: Fanget på nettet
- 2007: Ylvis III
- 2008: Sound of Music
