= Øivind Blunck =

Norwegian actor and comedian

- Born: 28 December 1950 (age 75); Norway
- Occupations: Comedian, actor, singer
- Spouse: Guri Schanke

Øivind Blunck (born 28 December 1950) is a Norwegian comedian and actor.

He is best known for his numerous performances with the Norwegian Theatre, and for playing the eccentric, moped-driving ladies' man "Fridtjof", living in Enebakk. Another memorable character is Reidar, a teen growing up in the late 1980s heavily fascinated by British pop culture such as Sky Channel, Pat Sharp and Samantha Fox. Blunck also originated the part of Thénardier in the Norwegian version of Alain Boublil and Claude-Michel Schönberg's musical Les Misérables in 1988 in Oslo. His performance of the character's only solo in the musical - "Dog Eats Dog" is featured in the Stage by Stage documentary accompanying the DVD versions of the musical. He has also reappeared several times in Olsenbanden as "Holm", the aide of superintendent "Hermansen", played by Sverre Wilberg.

Blunck was married to actress Guri Schanke. They lived in Oslo.
