= Chat Noir =

Cabaret and revue theatre in Oslo, Norway

Coordinates: 59°54′48.98″N 10°43′55.83″E

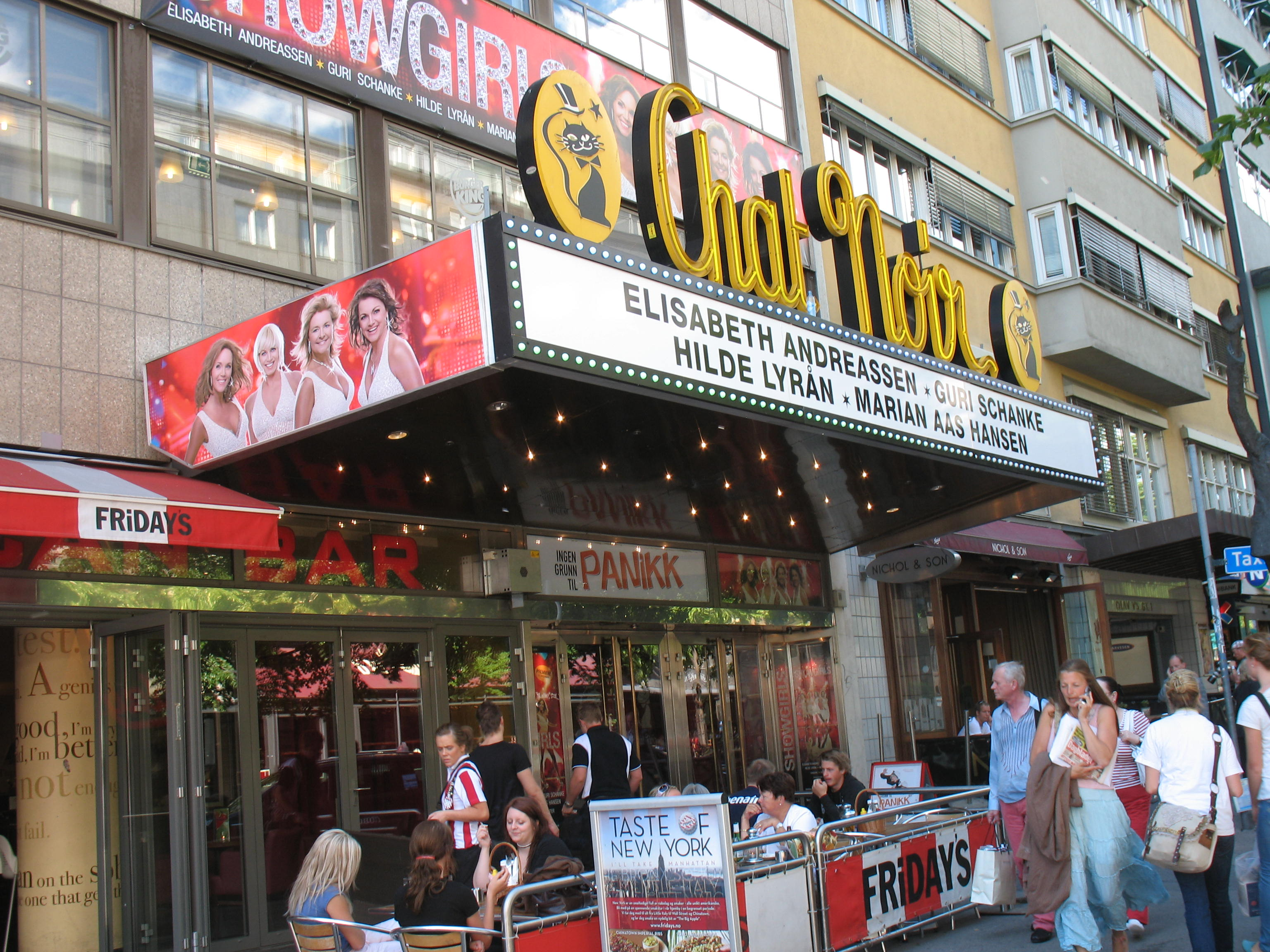
- Main entrance
- Interactive map of Chat Noir
- Address: Klingenberggata 5 Oslo; Norway

Construction
- Opened: 1912
- Years active: 1912-1963, 1964-present

Chat Noir (French for 'black cat') is a cabaret and revue theatre in Oslo, Norway. It was established in 1912 by Bokken Lasson. The current director is Tom Sterri.

== Establishment ==
Chat Noir was established as a cabaret in 1912 by singer Bokken Lasson and her later husband, writer Vilhelm Dybwad, modelled after the Paris cabaret Le Chat Noir from the 19th century.

During a visit to Paris in the early 1890s Bokken Lasson had found the inspiration of her life. She experienced the literary cabarets of the time, and performers such as Yvette Guilbert. The next years she toured European cities, wearing a self-composed costume, singing gypsy songs and playing lute, performing on the street, at restaurants, cabarets and occasionally in musical comedies.

Chat Noir opened 1 March 1912 in the Tivoli building. Bokken Lasson managed the cabaret from 1912 to 1917.

Chat Noir became a cultural meeting place, with the artists Christian and Oda Krohg (Bokken's sister) as leading figures. Their son Per Krohg painted the first decorations. To begin with Chat Noir was a literary cabaret. Herman Wildenvey and Arnulf Øverland contributed with poetry, Vilhelm Dybwad composed melodies, and Bokken Lasson was singing. In 1913 the first revue, called 1913, was played at Chat Noir. In 1916 Lalla Christensen was introduced, singing children's songs. Lalla – later married Carlsen – was engaged at Chat Noir until 1947, and came to be one of the most popular revue artists in Norway.

== Post World War I ==
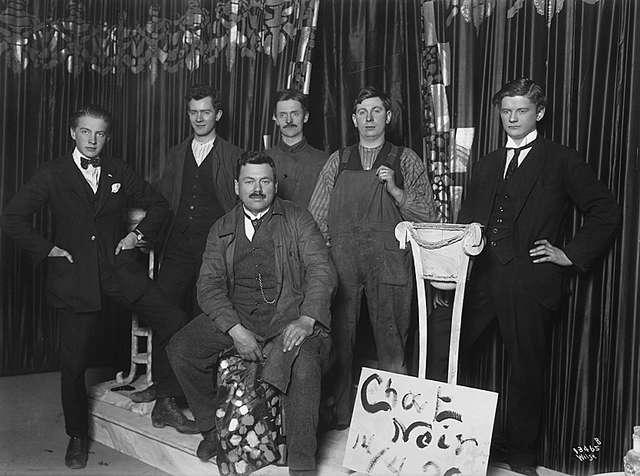
Group of Chat Noir actors in 1920.

Victor Bernau led the theatre from 1920 to 1928, and during this period Chat Noir won its reputation as a modern revue theatre. Johan Henrik Wiers-Jenssen took over as manager from 1926, with Bernau as artistical director the first years.

== World War II ==
During the occupation of Norway by Nazi Germany during World War II, private theatres, including Chat Noir, continued playing, but the material was subject to censorship.

At the outset of the theatre strike 21 May 1941, when six actors at Nationaltheatret had been fired by the Nazi authorities, director Wiers-Jenssen promptly cancelled a premiere shortly before the public was to enter.

== Post war ==
Jens Book-Jenssen was manager from 1947 to 1950. Ernst Diesen was manager from 1950 to 1953. In 1954 Chat Noir went bankrupt, after allegations of tax evasion. From 1954 to 1959 Book-Jenssen was manager. From 1959 to 1963 Chat Noir was hired by Egil Monn-Iversen. The theatre was severely damaged by a fire in 1963, but after rehabilitation it reopened in 1964, when Einar Schanke was the new manager. From 1971 Chat Noir was hired by the municipality of Oslo, and the scene was used for revues, musicals and other theatrical performances. The 1980s saw revues by Dag Frøland and Dizzie Tunes at Chat Noir. From 1996 Chat Noir was again a private theatre, and the new manager was Tom Sterri.
