= En stilla flirt =

1934 film

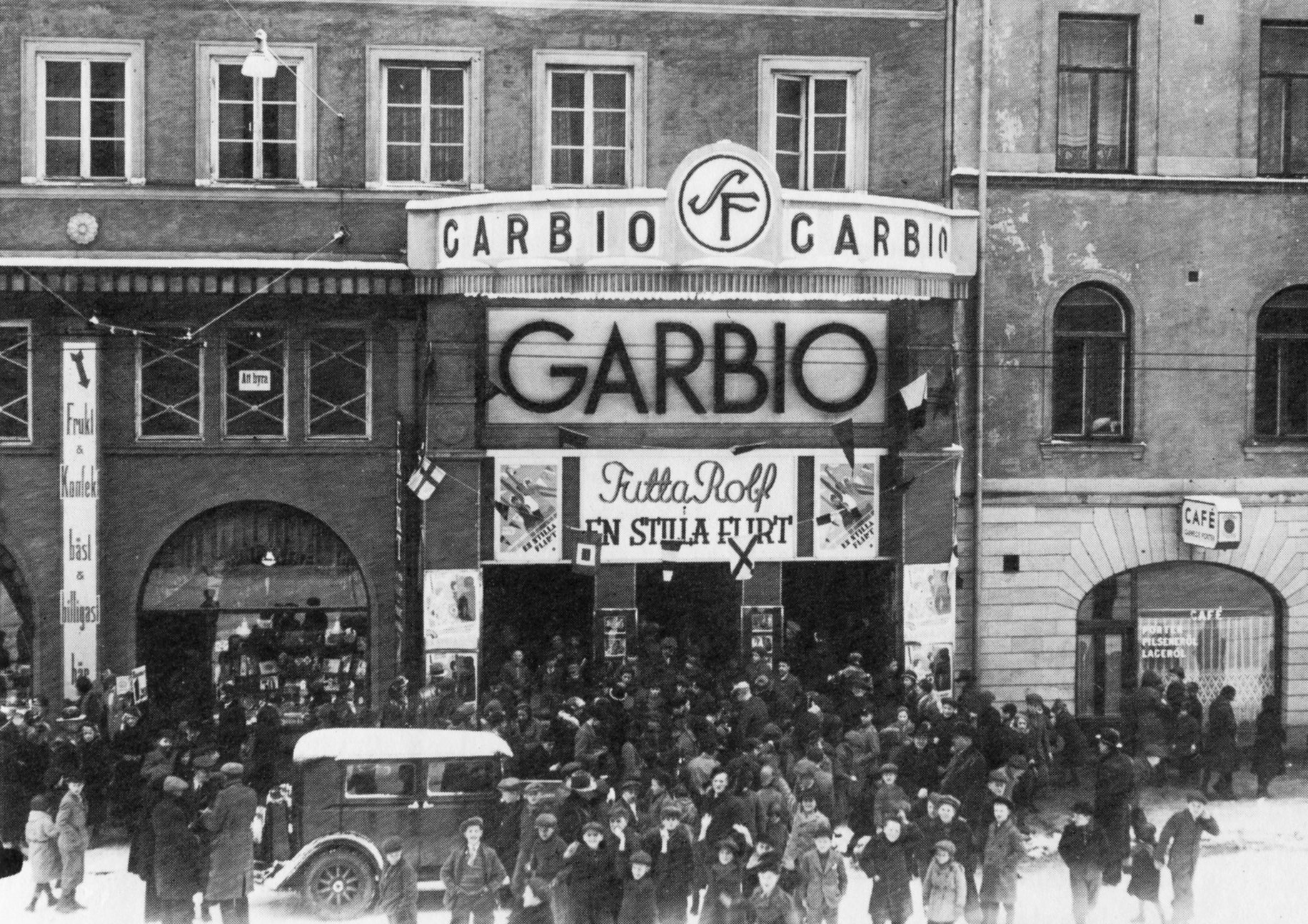
- A Quite Flirt (1934) in cinema
- Directed by: Gustaf Molander
- Written by: Gösta Stevens
- Based on: Edith Øberg's novel Min knapphullsblomst
- Starring: Tutta Rolf; Ernst Eklund; Margit Manstad; Einar Axelsson; Thor Modéen
- Distributed by: Svensk Filmindustri
- Release date: January 29, 1934
- Running time: 95 minutes
- Country: Sweden
- Language: Swedish

En stilla flirt (A Quiet Flirt) is a Swedish romantic comedy film from 1934. It is the Swedish-language version of a twin production with the 1933 Norwegian-language version En stille flirt. It is based on the novel Min knapphullsblomst (The Flower in My Buttonhole) by Edith Øberg. It was distributed by the company Svensk Filmindustri. The screenplay was written by Gösta Stevens and the film was directed by Gustaf Molander. It is 95 minutes long. The Norwegian actress Tutta Rolf played the female lead in both versions of the film. In the Swedish version, her character was called Diddi Werner, and in the Norwegian version she was called Lillemor.

== Cast ==
- Tutta Rolf as Diddi Werner
- Ernst Eklund as Doctor Gunnar Green
- Margit Manstad as Sally Garbel
- Einar Axelsson as Henry Wallé
- Thor Modéen as Swanson
- Carl-Gunnar Wingård as Gründer
- Steinar Jøraandstad as Dr. Gerhardt
- Benkt-Åke Benktsson as Mr. Wilder
- Gull Natorp as Mrs. Wilder
- Julia Cæsar as Aunt Amalia
- Lotten Olsson as Aunt Lotten
