= En stille flirt =

1933 film

- Directed by: Gustaf Molander
- Written by: Gösta Stevens
- Based on: Edith Øberg's novel Min knapphullsblomst
- Starring: Tutta Rolf; Fridtjof Mjøen; Leif Amble-Næss; Sofie Bernhoft; Aase Bye
- Distributed by: Svensk Filmindustri
- Release date: December 26, 1933
- Running time: 95 minutes
- Country: Sweden
- Language: Norwegian

En stille flirt (A Quiet Flirt) is a Swedish romantic comedy film starring Norwegian actors from 1933. It is the Norwegian-language version of a twin production with the 1934 Swedish-language version En stilla flirt. It is based on the novel Min knapphullsblomst (The Flower in My Buttonhole) by Edith Øberg. It was distributed by the company Svensk Filmindustri. The screenplay was written by Gösta Stevens and the film was directed by Gustaf Molander. It is 95 minutes long.

The Swedish-language version of the film, En stilla flirt, was shot with Swedish actors at the same time. The Norwegian actress Tutta Rolf played the female lead in both versions of the film. In the Swedish version, her character was called Diddi Werner, and in the Norwegian version she was called Lillemor.

Tutta sang the title song from the film, which was composed by Jules Sylvain.

== Cast ==
- Tutta Rolf as Lillemor von Kragh
- Fridtjof Mjøen as Gunnar Green, a doctor
- Leif Amble-Næss as Doktor Gerhardt, a beautician
- Sofie Bernhoft as Amalia
- Aase Bye as Diddi Garbel, a revue prima donna
- Frithjof Fearnley as Mr. Wilder
- Hilda Fredriksen as Maja, a costume assistant
- Henry Gleditsch as Gründer, head of a tailor shop
- Mally Haaland as Mrs. Wilder
- Margit Lunde as Lotten
- Folkman Schaanning as Swanson, a photographer
- Agnethe Schibsted-Hansson as Hulda, Green's maid
- Aksel Thue as Walle, head of a perfume shop
- Emmy Worm-Müller as Marte
