= Roeck-Hansen =

Roeck-Hansen is a surname. Notable people with the surname include:

- Ester Roeck-Hansen (1897–1987), Swedish actress
- Harry Roeck-Hansen, Swedish actor
