= Hjalmar Bergman =

Swedish writer and playwright

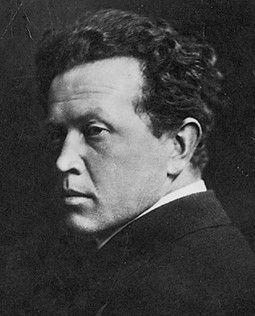
- Hjalmar Bergman
- Born: 19 September 1883; Örebro, Sweden
- Died: 1 January 1931 (aged 47); Berlin, Germany

Hjalmar Fredrik Elgérus Bergman (19 September 1883 – 1 January 1931) was a Swedish writer and playwright.

== Biography ==
The son of a banker in Örebro, Bergman briefly studied philosophy at Uppsala University but soon broke off his studies and took up the life of a free writer. He married Stina Lindberg, the daughter of actor and stage producer August Lindberg and Augusta Lindberg, and sister of Per Lindberg. Up to his father's death in 1915 Bergman was heavily sponsored by the family patriarch; after the old man died from a stroke it turned out that the family business had become highly indebted and Bergman was forced to start making money out of his writing and court readers in a more outgoing and more entertaining manner. He rose to the challenge and in the following ten years reached the peak of his work.

Much of his output takes place in a small town in mid-Sweden, which is growing into a parallel universe in a Balzacian manner. The shameful secrets of a dozen of interwoven families gradually come out of the closet as the stories grow increasingly symbolic. A pessimistic outlook is always counterbalanced by a grotesque humour - indeed, in a book like Markurells i Wadköping the latter almost succeeds in completely shading the former. The fictional town Wadköping is modelled on the author's hometown Örebro, and on Västerås, where he finished secondary school, there is for instance, like in Västerås, a bishop in Wadköping, but none in Örebro. When Örebro in 1965 opened its open-air museum featuring 19th century city life, it was named Wadköping.

After an unsuccessful bout as a manuscript writer in Hollywood, Bergman's alcoholism and narcotics abuse took over, from which he died prematurely; his final novel Clownen Jac mirrors his awareness of his drift into self-destruction as well as his belief in the honesty and purpose of artistic spectacle.

== Works ==
- Maria, Jesu moder (1905) (literal translation: Maria, Mother of Jesus)
- Solivro. Prins af Aeretanien (1906)
- Blå blommor (1907)
- Savonarola (1909)
- Amourer (1910)
- Hans Nåds testamente (1910, His Grace's Will or The Baron's Will, adapted into a film in 1919)
- Vi Bookar, Krokar och Rothar (1912)
- Loewenhistorier (1913)
- Komedier i Bergslagen, I - III (1914 - 1916)
- Mor i Sutre (1917)
- Marionettspel (1917) (Marionette Plays, includes Mr Sleeman Is Coming)
- En döds memoarer (1918, English translation Memoirs of a Dead Man, trans. Neil Smith, 2007)
- Markurells i Wadköping (1919, God's Orchid. Literal translation: The Markurells in Wadköping)
- Herr von Hancken (1920)
- Farmor och vår Herre (1921, Thy Rod and Thy Staff. Literal translation: Grandmother and Our Lord)
- Eros begravning (1922)
- Swedenhielms, 1923 (play adapted into a film of the same name in 1935, and again in 1943 as Ein glücklicher Mensch)
- Jag, Ljung och Medardus (1923)
- Chefen Fru Ingeborg (1924, English translation The Head of the Firm, Allen & Unwin, 1936)
- Flickan i Frack (1925)
- Jonas och Helen (1926)
- Kerrmans i Paradiset (1927)
- Lotten Brenners ferier (1928)
- Clownen Jac (1930, Jac The Clown)

=== Adaptations ===
- Hans Nåds Testamente, Markurells i Wadköping (1929, radio and stage versions)
- Fathers and Sons (1930, German film script with Paul Merzbach, after Markurells i Wadköping)
- Markurells i Wadköping (1931, Swedish film script with Paul Merzbach, after Markurells i Wadköping)

=== As Holger Brate ===
- Falska papper (1916)

== Selected filmography ==
- Anna-Clara and Her Brothers (1923)
- Charles XII (1925)
- Kalle Utter (1925)
- The Flying Dutchman (1925)
- A Perfect Gentleman (1927)
