= Sofie Bernhoft =

Norwegian actress (1870–1966)

- Born: July 11, 1870; Kristiania (now Oslo), Norway
- Died: February 17, 1966 (aged 95); Oslo, Norway
- Occupation: Actress
- Spouse: Halfdan Jebe
- Relatives: Hermine Bernhoft-Osa

Petra Marie Sofie Bernhoft (July 21, 1870 – February 17, 1966) was a Norwegian actress.

Sofie Bernhoft was the daughter of the prison priest and catechist Theodor Kristian Bernhoft (1833–1885) and Petra Martine Augusta Bernhoft (1841–?). She was the sister of the writer Hermine Bernhoft-Osa. She was married to the violinist and composer Halfdan Jebe (1868–1937).

Bernhoft started performing at the Central Theater in 1897, initially under Johan Fahlstrøm and later under the leadership of Rudolf Rasmussen. During the 1900–1901 season she was engaged with the Second Theater (Norwegian: Sekondteatret), and then in 1903 she started performing at the Fahlstrøm Theater. She also appeared in performances at the Mayol Theater, the Norwegian Theater, and the Carl Johan Theater.

She was with the Stavanger Permanent Theater (Norwegian: Stavanger faste scene) from 1918 to 1919 and later with NRK's Radio Theater. Bernhoft appeared in five films between 1933 and 1947, debuting in Gustaf Molander's En stille flirt.

She ran her own theater school in Oslo, where Guri Stormoen was among her students.

== Filmography ==
- 1933: En stille flirt as Amalia
- 1938: Bør Børson Jr. as the priest's wife
- 1942: Trysil-Knut as Olga Liplassen
- 1943: Den nye lægen as Madam Anders
- 1947: Sankt Hans fest as Mrs. Kruse
