= Intermezzo (1939 film) =

1939 film by Gregory Ratoff

- 1945 Argentine film poster
- Directed by: Gregory Ratoff
- Screenplay by: George O'Neil
- Story by: Gosta Stevens; Gustav Molander (from the original by)
- Produced by: David O. Selznick
- Starring: Leslie Howard; Ingrid Bergman; Edna Best; John Halliday
- Cinematography: Gregg Toland, A.S.C. Harry Stradling (uncredited)
- Edited by: Francis D. Lyon
- Music by: Robert Russell Bennett (uncredited); Max Steiner (uncredited); Lou Forbes (music directed by)
- Production company: Selznick International Pictures, Inc.
- Distributed by: United Artists
- Release date: September 22, 1939
- Running time: 70 minutes
- Country: United States
- Language: English

Intermezzo (also called Intermezzo A Love Story) is a 1939 American romantic drama remake of the same-titled 1936 Swedish film. It stars Leslie Howard as a married virtuoso violinist who falls in love with his accompanist, played by Ingrid Bergman in her Hollywood debut. Bergman had played the same role in the Swedish original against Gösta Ekman.

The film was directed by Gregory Ratoff and produced by David O. Selznick. It features multiple orchestrations of the title piece by Heinz Provost, which won a contest associated with the original film's production. The screenplay by George O'Neil was based on that of the original film by Gosta Stevens and Gustav Molander. Produced by Selznick International Pictures. its filming schedule overlapped that of Gone with the Wind.

The film score by Lou Forbes was nominated for an Academy Award, and music credit was given to Robert Russell Bennett, Max Steiner, Heinz Provost and Christian Sinding. It was on a preliminary list of submissions from the studios for Cinematography (Black-and-White) but was not nominated.

== Plot ==
Holger Brandt, a celebrated virtuoso violinist, meets Anita Hoffman, his daughter's piano instructor, during a trip home. Impressed by Anita's talent, he invites her to accompany him on his next tour. They begin touring together and a passionate relationship ensues. Holger's wife Margit asks him for a divorce.

Knowing how much Holger misses his daughter Ann Marie and son Eric, and torn with guilt for breaking up his family, Anita decides to pursue her own career and leaves Holger. He returns home to see his children again. He first travels to Ann Marie's school, but as she runs across the street to greet him, she is hit by a car in front of his eyes. He takes the injured Ann Marie back home and confronts his angry son in an attempt to explain his infidelity.

To Holger's relief, the doctor informs him that Ann Marie will survive and eventually recover from her injuries. Margit then forgives Holger and welcomes him back into his family.

== Cast ==
- Leslie Howard as Holger Brandt
- Edna Best as Margit, his wife
- Ann Todd as Ann Marie, their daughter
- Douglas Scott as Eric, their son
- John Halliday as Thomas Stenborg
- Enid Bennett as Greta, his wife
- Cecil Kellaway as Charles Moler
- Eleanor Wesselhoeft as Emma
- Maria Flynn as Marianne
- and Ingrid Bergman as Anita Hoffman

Uncredited (in order of appearance)
Edmund Mortimer	man standing backstage in wing with Charles Moler
Doris Lloyd	schoolteacher at scene where Ann Marie is struck by a passing vehicle
Holmes Herbert	physician who examines Mary Ann following her accident

== Production ==
Call sheet from the film.

The musical duets with Howard and Bergman were dubbed for the soundtrack by professional musicians; however, the actors' hands show the actual music being played. Bergman plays the full piano parts (for Edvard Grieg's Concerto in A minor and Christian Sinding's "Rustle of Spring"), so her hand positions are correct for the music soundtrack. Howard could not play the violin, so a professional violinist named Al Sack, who bore a striking resemblance to Howard, was brought in to teach him proper violin posture and bowing technique. During filming, Sack rested on his knees, out of view of the camera, and did the fingering on all of the closeups. In the film, Sack's left hand is shown along with Howard's bowing arm and profile. Sack also doubled for Howard during the long shots in front of the orchestra.

== Radio adaptations and remake ==
Bergman was heard in a radio adaptation of Intermezzo on Lux Radio Theatre on January 29, 1940, with Herbert Marshall, and again on June 4, 1945 with Joseph Cotten. On October 5, 1946, Marshall starred in an adaptation of Intermezzo on the Hollywood Star Time radio program.

The film was loosely remade in 1980 as a vehicle for Willie Nelson titled Honeysuckle Rose.
