= Dollar (film) =

1938 film

- Ingrid Bergman (right) in a scene from the film
- Directed by: Gustaf Molander
- Written by: Stina Bergman
- Based on: Dollar: Komedi i tre akter 1926 play by Hjalmar Bergman
- Starring: Ingrid Bergman; Georg Rydeberg; Tutta Rolf
- Cinematography: Åke Dahlqvist
- Edited by: Oscar Rosander
- Music by: Eric Bengtson
- Production company: Svensk Filmindustri
- Release date: September 1938
- Running time: 78 minutes
- Country: Sweden
- Languages: Swedish; English

Dollar is a 1938 Swedish comedy film directed by Gustaf Molander and starring Ingrid Bergman, Georg Rydeberg and Tutta Rolf. The film's art direction was by Arne Åkermark.

== Plot ==
Before a special evening at the Royal Yacht Club, Ludvig von Battwyhl converses with Andersson, a hotel valet. The phone rings, with the caller stating Louis Brenner is not arriving. Ludvig's wife Katja and Sussi Brenner are disappointed by Louis's absence and join Julia, a wealthy Swedish actress married to Kurt Balzar, a Swedish industrialist. At a nearby casino, Louis is a compulsive gambler, who has lost over 50,000 kronor. All three couples are planning to vacation at the Åre ski resort. Brenner is later notified that his wife Sussi has taken ill. He writes a cheque to his opponent promising to cover his losses.

When Louis arrives, he is angered that his wife lied. He tells Julia about his gambling debts, but declines her assistance. Before leaving the Balzars' residence, Louis apologizes to Sussi, and they depart. Alone, Kurt, who is jealous of his wife's affections towards Louis, angrily tells Julia he will not cover Louis's gambling debt. The next day, Julia learns from Ludvig that her husband's company shares are in decline at the stock market. She calls their bank to prevent 200 shares from being sold. Ludvig writes a cheque to cover their losses, which Julia gives Sussi to pay off Louis's debt.

Nearby the ski resort, Dr. Jonson treats an infant girl, ill with a fever. At the hotel, Sussi asks Ludvig about who wrote the cheque and deduces it was Julia. She catches Louis eavesdropping, insults him, and locks herself in her room. With their marriage in trouble, Ludvig advises Louis to have another child. Louis then asks Ludvig if he wrote the cheque, but Ludvig repeats his denial; Louis suspects Kurt wrote it. Julia arrives at the resort.

During a blizzard, Sussi has wandered outside and is picked by a couple inside their vehicle. She is driven back to the resort but she is unable to walk on her legs. She is placed under the attentive care of Karin, a nurse. Mary Jonston, a wealthy American who fancies herself a psychoanalyst, arrives, and diagnoses Sussi as having severe psychological distress. At a medical clinic, Sussi has not slept for several hours but makes amends with Louis. She further forbids Julia from visiting the clinic. There, Mary flirts with Dr. Jonson. She bets with Jonson to successfully cure Sussi's paralysis in 12 hours, and if he wins, she will donate 10 free stays at his clinic. If she wins, Jonson will have to marry her.

However, Julia arrives at the clinic and meets with Louis in a hallway. Sussi overhears their conversation, and tries to walk but falls down. Julia and Louis rush to her aid, and Sussi tearfully breaks down. Julia comforts Sussi, and Sussi falls asleep. During dinner, Mary feels she has won since 18 hours have passed and Sussi is not yet cured. She gathers all three couples to psychoanalyze Sussi's condition. She reveals that Julia wrote the cheque using Ludvig's money. Ludwig agreed because he was in love with Sussi. Sussi attempted to freeze herself to death, but she tearfully denies it. Sussi rises from her chair and walks again. The three couples settle their differences, and Sussi thanks Dr. Jonson.

Back in his office, Jonson corrects Mary, stating it was actually Katja's money that was used to cover Louis's debt. Jonson calls off the wager and prepares to leave the resort, which angers Mary. Back in their hotel room, Julia and Kurt reconcile. Mary knocks on their door, telling Julia about Dr. Jonson's betrayal towards her. Julia reassures Mary that Jonson loves her. Before Jonson leaves, Mary professes her love to him. The two kiss.

== Cast ==
- Ingrid Bergman as Julia Balzar
- Georg Rydeberg as Kurt Balzar
- Tutta Rolf as Sussi Brenner
- Kotti Chaveas Louis Brenner
- Birgit Tengroth as Katja von Battwyhl
- Håkan Westergren as Ludvig von Battwyhl
- Edvin Adolphson as Dr. Jonson
- Elsa Burnett as Mary Jonston
- Margareta Bergfeldt as a woman in the hotel lobby
- Olle Björklund as young woman at the hotel
- Millan Bolander as Karin, a nurse
- Gösta Cederlund as a man at the Royal Yacht Club
- Erland Colliander as a man at the Royal Yacht Club
- Nils Dahlgren as a man at the Royal Yacht Club
- Ernesto Dethore as Walker, an Argentine poker player
- N. Dickson as Charles, Mary's Black chauffeur
- Aina Elkan as hotel clerk
- Ingrid Envall as hotel maid
- David Erikson as hall porter
- George Fant as a young man in the hotel lobby
- Wilhelm Haqvinius as a man at the Royal Yacht Club
- Hester Harvey as Mammy, Mary Jonston's maid
- Axel Högel as Andersson, a Royal Yacht Club valet
- Helge Kihlberg as Jansson, a waiter at The Royal Yacht Club
- Allan Lindner as Calle, the bellboy
- Yngve Nyqvist as a man at the Royal Yacht Club
- Erik Rosén as a man at the Royal Yacht Club
- Carl Ström as a man at the Royal Yacht Club
- Silvia Zelazowsky as a woman in the hotel lobby
