= Under False Flag =

Under False Flag may refer to:

- Under False Flag (1932 film), a German cloak-and-dagger film
- Under False Flag (1935 film), a Swedish comedy film
