= Servant's Entrance =

1932 film

- Directed by: Gustaf Molander
- Written by: Sigrid Boo (novel); Sölve Cederstrand
- Starring: Carl Barcklind; Tutta Rolf; Bengt Djurberg
- Cinematography: Åke Dahlqvist
- Edited by: Rolf Husberg
- Music by: Eric Bengtson
- Production company: Svensk Filmindustri
- Distributed by: Svensk Filmindustri
- Release date: December 12, 1932
- Running time: 100 minutes
- Country: Sweden
- Language: Swedish

Servant's Entrance (Swedish: Vi som går köksvägen) is a 1932 Swedish comedy film directed by Gustaf Molander and starring Carl Barcklind, Tutta Rolf and Bengt Djurberg.

The film's art direction was by Arne Åkermark.

== Main cast ==
- Carl Barcklind as Adolf
- Tutta Rolf as Helga Breder
- Bengt Djurberg as Bertil Frigård
- Emma Meissner as Mrs. Beck
- Karin Swanström as Laura Persson, cook
- Sigurd Wallén as Pontus
- Tollie Zellman as Pontus' wife
- Renée Björling as Astrid Beck
- Anne-Marie Brunius as Ellen
- Einar Fagstad as Bengtsson, teacher
- Siegfried Fischer as Anders
- Rut Holm as Olga, housemaid
- Åke Ohberg as Joergen Beckman
- Mathias Taube as Hans Breder
- Anna Olin as Aunt Alexandra

== See also ==
- Servants' Entrance (1934)

== Bibliography ==
- Larsson, Mariah & Marklund, Anders (ed.). Swedish Film: An Introduction and Reader. Nordic Academic Press, 2010.
