= Sara Learns Manners =

1937 film

- Directed by: Gustaf Molander
- Written by: Gösta Stevens
- Produced by: Stellan Claësson
- Starring: Tutta Rolf; Emma Meissner; Aino Taube
- Cinematography: Julius Jaenzon
- Edited by: Oscar Rosander
- Music by: Jules Sylvain
- Production company: Svensk Filmindustri
- Distributed by: Svensk Filmindustri
- Release date: 9 August 1937
- Running time: 75 minutes
- Country: Sweden
- Language: Swedish

Sara Learns Manners (Swedish: Sara lär sig folkvett) is a 1937 Swedish comedy film directed by Gustaf Molander and starring Tutta Rolf, Emma Meissner and Aino Taube. It was shot at the Råsunda Studios in Stockholm. The film's sets were designed by the art director Arne Åkermark.

== Synopsis ==
Sara works as a maid in the middle-class Haller family, a widow and her three grown-up children. When Sara unexpectedly inherits a fortune from a rich uncle in Australia, Madame Haller believes she is still too naive to go out in the world with her newfound wealth and convinces her to stay as a guest in their house until they can teach her how a lady should behave.

== Cast ==
- Tutta Rolf as Sara Holm
- Emma Meissner as Eva Haller
- Aino Taube as Monika Haller
- Håkan Westergren as Teddy Haller
- Kotti Chave as Georg Haller
- Wiktor Andersson as Johan, house-servant
- Jullan Jonsson as Hulda, cook
- Olga Andersson as Terese Berg
- Millan Bolander as Maid Anna
- Carl Browallius as Publisher
- Artur Cederborgh as Mr. Berg
- Gösta Cederlund as Banker
- Georg Fernqvist as Jeweller
- Folke Helleberg as Automobile Salesman
- Carl Ström as Gyllenberg, banker
- Åke Uppström as Student

== Bibliography ==
- Qvist, Per Olov & von Bagh, Peter. Guide to the Cinema of Sweden and Finland. Greenwood Publishing Group, 2000.
