= Swedenhielms =

1935 film

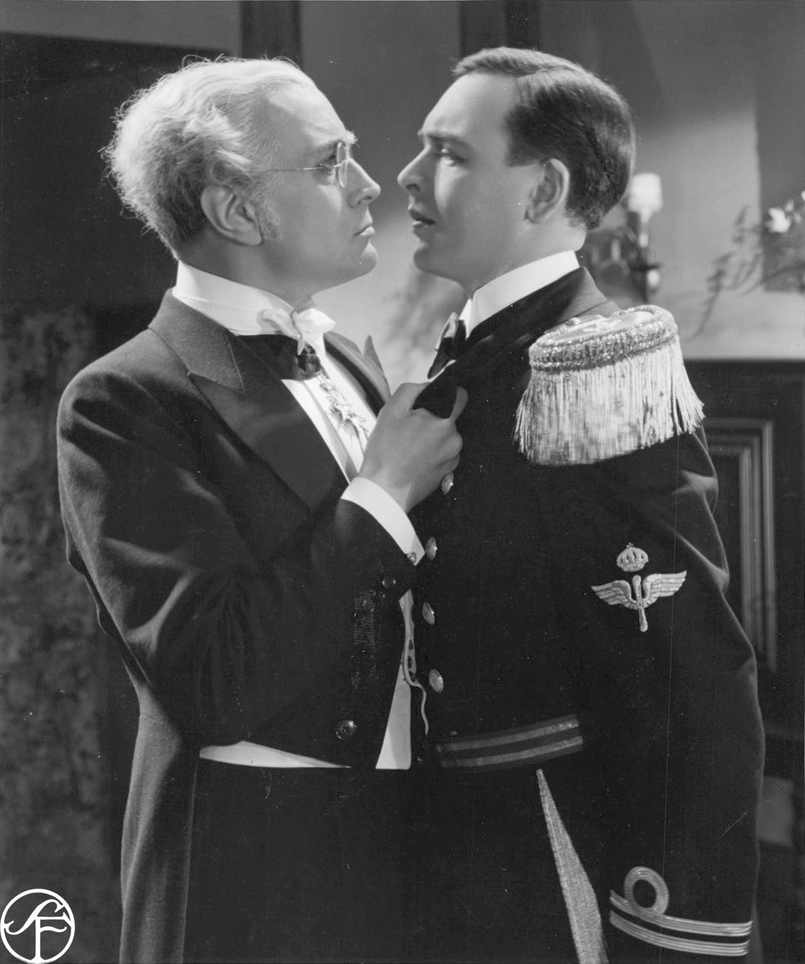
- Still with Gösta Ekman and Håkan Westergren
- Directed by: Gustaf Molander
- Written by: Stina Bergman; Gustaf Molander
- Produced by: Stellan Claësson
- Starring: Gösta Ekman; Karin Swanström; Tutta Rolf; Björn Berglund; Håkan Westergren; Ingrid Bergman
- Cinematography: Åke Dahlqvist
- Music by: Helge Lindberg
- Distributed by: AB Svensk Filmindustri
- Release date: March 25, 1935 (Sweden)
- Running time: 92 minutes
- Country: Sweden
- Language: Swedish

Swedenhielms is a 1935 Swedish comedy-drama film directed and co-written by Gustaf Molander. The film is based on the play by Hjalmar Bergman from 1923 and starrs Gösta Ekman, Karin Swanström, and Tutta Rolf.

== Plot ==
The Swedenhielm family is an old proud nobility family. The head is the old physics professor Rolf Swedenhielm. His three children also live with him: Bo, Julia and Rolf Jr., as well as the hearty housekeeper Boman. The family is on the verge of bankruptcy and the only hope is that the professor is awarded the Nobel Prize.

== Cast ==
- Gösta Ekman as Professor Rolf Swedenhielm, engineer and inventor
- Björn Berglund as Rolf Swedenhielm Jr, engineer
- Håkan Westergren as Bo Swedenhielm, air Lt.
- Tutta Rolf as Julia Swedenhielm, actress
- Ingrid Bergman as Astrid, Bo Swedenhielm's fiancée
- Sigurd Wallén as Erik Erikson, usurer
- Karin Swanström as Marta Boman, housekeeper
- Nils Ericson as Pedersén, journalist
- Mona Geijer-Falkner as cleaning woman
