= Elsa Burnett =

Swedish actress (1902–1999)

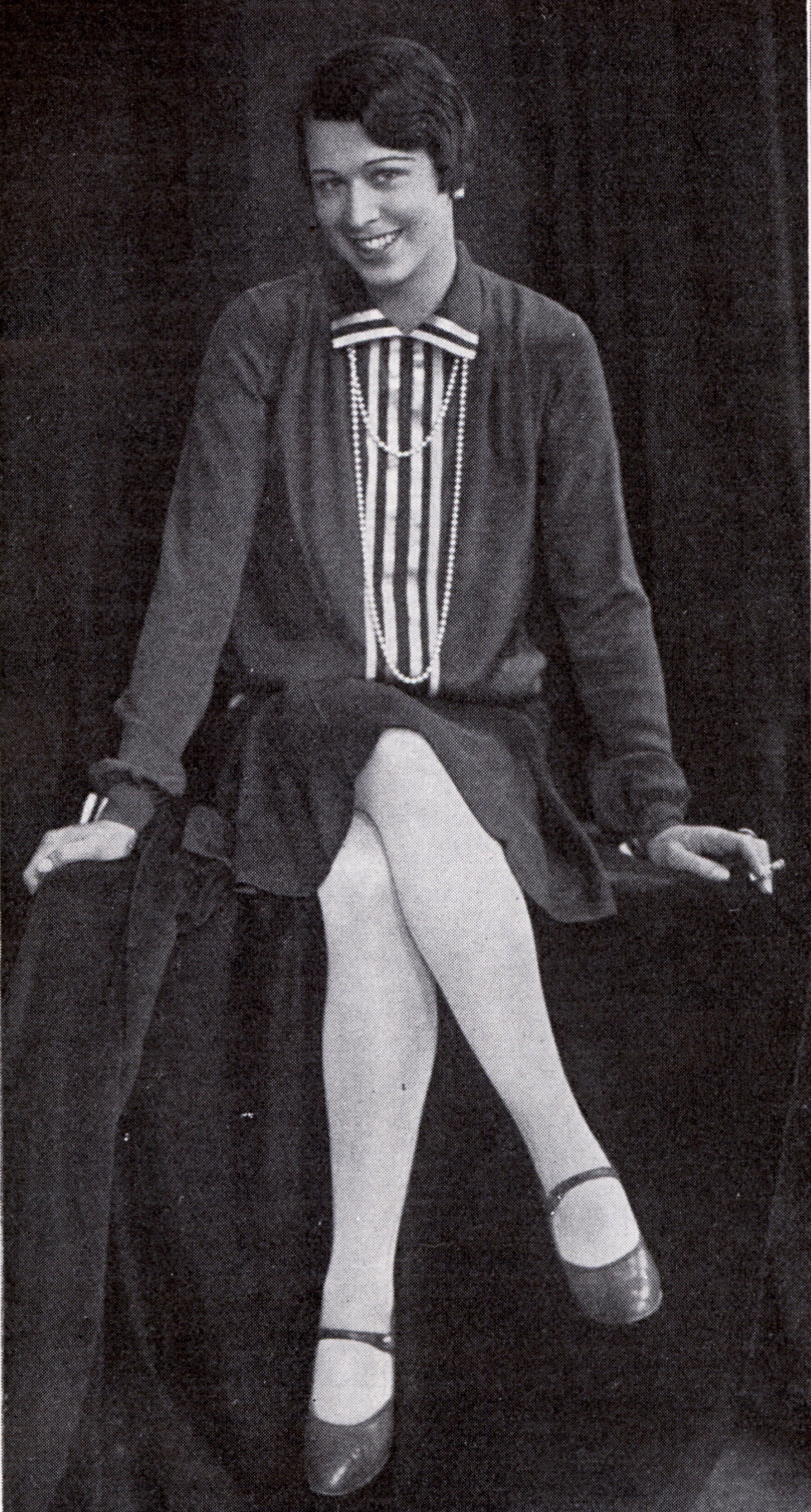
- Burnett in 1927.
- Born: Elsa Olga Marguerite Lundquist; 10 December 1902; Stockholm, Sweden
- Died: 3 January 1999 (aged 96); Höganäs, Sweden
- Other names: Elsa Lundquist, Elsa Olga Marguerite Lundquist
- Occupation: Actress
- Years active: 1928-1944 (film)

Elsa Burnett (born Elsa Olga Marguerite Lundquist; 10 December 1902 – 3 January 1999) was a Swedish stage and film actress.

== Early life ==
On 10 December 1902, Burnett was born in Stockholm, Sweden.

== Filmography ==
- 1928 Gustaf Wasa - as daughter at Svärdsjögården. Credited as Elsa Lundqvist.
- 1932 Tango
- 1938 Dollar - as Mary Jonston.
- 1939 Emilie Högquist
- 1939 Variety Is the Spice of Life
- 1944 Den heliga lögnen - as Helen Wahlman. (In Swedish).

== Bibliography ==
- Lawrence J. Quirk. The films of Ingrid Bergman. Carol Pub Group, 1975.
