= Hermine Bernhoft-Osa =

Norwegian writer (1865–1929)

- Born: September 27, 1865; Eigersund Municipality, Norway
- Died: August 7, 1929 (aged 63); Voss Municipality, Norway
- Occupation: Author
- Spouse: Lars Osa
- Children: Sigbjørn Bernhoft Osa; Theodor Bernhoft Osa
- Relatives: Sofie Bernhoft

Augusta Sophie Hermine Bernhoft-Osa (September 27, 1865 – August 7, 1929) was a Norwegian children's book author.

Hermine Bernhoft-Osa was the daughter of the prison priest and catechist Theodor Kristian Bernhoft (1833–1885) and Petra Martine Augusta Bernhoft (1841–?). She was the sister of the actress Sofie Bernhoft. She was married to the author Lars Osa (1860–1950) and was the mother of the fiddler and folk musician Sigbjørn Bernhoft Osa, who was born in Ulvik in 1910. The family frequently lived in Valle in Setesdal, where Lars Osa painted. During a stay there in 1897, Hermine Bernhoft-Osa started Sunday school in Valle. Hermine Bernhoft-Osa wrote several children's books from 1887 onward, and some of them were reprinted several times.

== Bibliography ==
- Fra barnets verden – fortælling for smaafolk (From the Child's World: A Story for Little People), 1887, reprinted 1902 and 1917
- Smaatraak (Little Steps), 1889, reprinted 1903 and 1915
- Mere fra barnets verden (More from the Child's World), 1890
- Den, som liden er – fortællinger for børn og børnevenner (The One Who Is Little: Stories for Children and Friends of Children), 1892, reprinted 1916
- Stua fuld og andre fortællinger (Filled to the Brim and Other Stories), 1892, reprinted 1902
