= Love and Deficit =

1932 film

- Directed by: Gustaf Molander
- Written by: Vilhelm Moberg (play); Gösta Stevens
- Starring: Sigurd Wallén; Tutta Rolf; Edvin Adolphson
- Cinematography: Julius Jaenzon
- Music by: Eric Bengtson
- Production company: Film AB Minerva
- Distributed by: Svensk Filmindustri
- Release date: 1 August 1932
- Running time: 72 minutes
- Country: Sweden
- Language: Swedish

Love and Deficit (Swedish: Kärlek och kassabrist) is a 1932 Swedish comedy film directed by Gustaf Molander and starring Sigurd Wallén, Tutta Rolf and Edvin Adolphson. It was shot at the Råsunda Studios in Stockholm. The film's art direction was by Arne Åkermark.

== Main cast ==
- Sigurd Wallén as Andersson
- Tutta Rolf as Margit Hauge
- Edvin Adolphson as Bengt Berger
- Dagmar Ebbesen as Augusta
- Ruth Stevens as Svea Strandin
- Thor Modéen as Manager Gyllén
- Nils Lundell as Acel Lindell
- Victor Lundberg as Embezzler
- Doris Nelson as Teacher
- John Melin as Olsson
- Ludde Juberg as Embezzler

== Bibliography ==
- Qvist, Per Olov & von Bagh, Peter. Guide to the Cinema of Sweden and Finland. Greenwood Publishing Group, 2000.
