= Black Roses (1932 film) =

1932 film

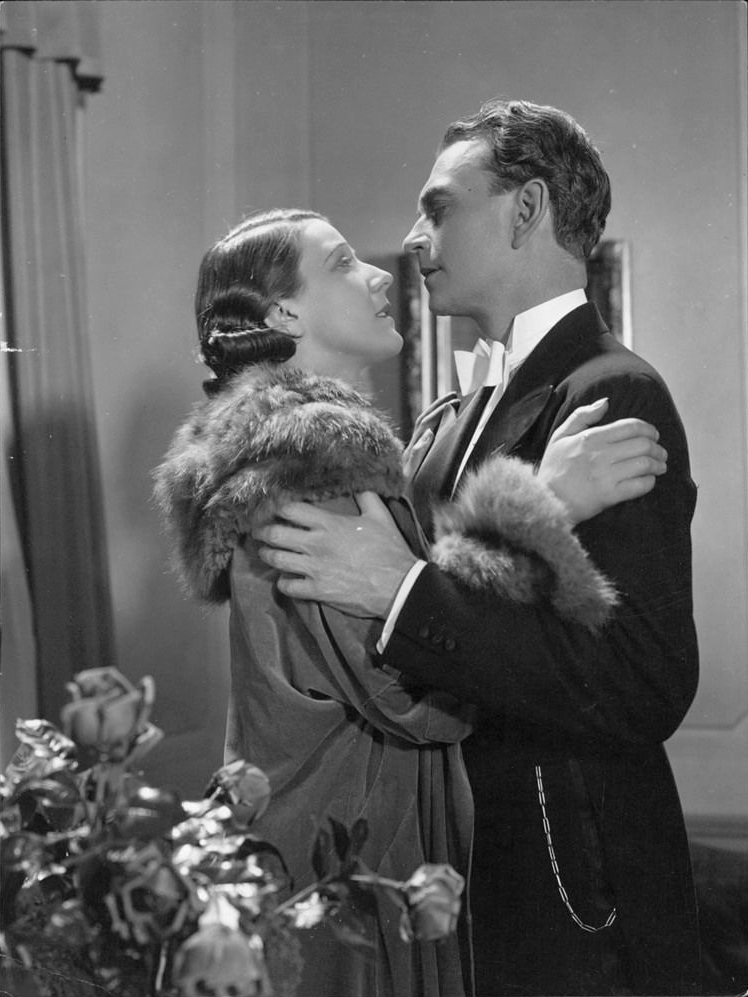
- Film still with Esther Roeck-Hansen and Einar Axelsson
- Directed by: Gustaf Molander
- Written by: Ragnar Hyltén-Cavallius; Ernst Josephson (poem); Sigfrid Siwertz
- Starring: Ester Roeck-Hansen; Einar Axelsson; Karin Swanström
- Cinematography: Åke Dahlqvist
- Music by: Hugo Alfvén; Jean Sibelius; Evert Taube
- Production company: Svensk Filmindustri
- Distributed by: Svensk Filmindustri
- Release date: 29 February 1932
- Running time: 86 minutes
- Country: Sweden
- Language: Swedish

Black Roses (Swedish: Svarta rosor) is a 1932 Swedish drama film directed by Gustaf Molander and starring Ester Roeck-Hansen, Einar Axelsson and Karin Swanström. It is based on a short story by Sigfrid Siwertz.

The film's art direction was by Arne Åkermark.

== Cast ==
- Ester Roeck-Hansen as Inga Gustafsson
- Einar Axelsson as Johannes Borin
- Karin Swanström as Tilda
- Carl Barcklind as Hampus Moberg
- Nils Lundell as Edvin Jonsson
- Sigurd Wallén as Fernblom
- Constance Byström as Inga's Mother
- Eric Abrahamsson as Gentleman with newspaper on bus
- Anna-Lisa Berg as Guest at dance restaurant
- Helga Brofeldt as Lady with laundry
- Ossian Brofeldt as Guest at restaurant
- Artur Cederborgh as Laughing painter
- Julia Cæsar as Mrs. Karlsson
- Bengt Edgren as Boy with blonde curly hair
- Emil Fjellström as Skipper
- Mona Geijer-Falkner as Lady with laundry
- Bengt-Olof Granberg as Guest at dance restaurant
- Sune Holmqvist as Schoolboy
- Harry Isacsson as Ljungmark - Student
- Astrid Marmstedt as Guest at dance restaurant
- Mim Persson as Guest at restaurant
- Holger Sjöberg as Sailor at freight steamboat
- Ruth Stevens as Girl at freight steamboat
- Helle Winther as Boy on the street

== Bibliography ==
- Qvist, Per Olov & von Bagh, Peter. Guide to the Cinema of Sweden and Finland. Greenwood Publishing Group, 2000.
