= The Marriage Game =

1935 film

The Marriage
- Directed by: Ragnar Hyltén-Cavallius
- Written by: Karl-Gerhard; Ragnar Hyltén-Cavallius; Lorens Marmstedt
- Produced by: Lorens Marmstedt
- Starring: Zarah Leander; Gösta Cederlund; Harry Roeck-Hansen
- Cinematography: Karl-Erik Alberts; Åke Dahlqvist; Julius Jaenzon
- Edited by: Thor L. Brooks; Rolf Husberg
- Music by: Jules Sylvain
- Production company: Svensk Filmindustri
- Distributed by: Svensk Filmindustri
- Release date: 25 November 1935
- Running time: 83 minutes
- Country: Sweden
- Language: Swedish

The Marriage Game (Swedish: Äktenskapsleken) is a 1935 Swedish comedy drama film directed and co-written by Ragnar Hyltén-Cavallius and starring Zarah Leander, Gösta Cederlund and Harry Roeck-Hansen.

The film's art direction was by Arne Åkermark.

== Cast ==
- Zarah Leander as Tora Diidiken
- Gösta Cederlund as Chief editor Nordenson, her 1st husband
- Harry Roeck-Hansen as Statsrådet Ström, her 2nd husband
- Ragnar Widestedt as Direktör Melin, her 3rd husband
- Einar Axelsson as Gunnar Grahn, her 4th husband
- Elsa Carlsson as Polly, her friend
- Karl-Gerhard as Hjalmar Gregorsson, her lawyer
- Karin Swanström as Carolina Berg
- Åke Ohberg as Per-Olof, her son
- Rune Carlsten as Riksdagsman Larsson
- Maritta Marke as Märta, his daughter
- John Norrman as Sund
- Emmy Albiin as Curious Lady at the Square
- Anna-Lisa Baude as Maria, Housemaid
- Gillis Blom as a Journalist
- Ernst Brunman as Nilsson, Hairdresser
- Karl-Ewert Christenson as Guest at Tora's Party
- Agnes Clementsson as Miss Andersson
- Nils Dahlgren as Guest at Tora's Party
- Carl Deurell as Vicar
- Nils Ekstam as Juror
- Hartwig Fock as Postman at the Meeting
- Margarete Fries as Die Stimme fuer Zarah Leander
- Anna-Lisa Fröberg as Guest at Tora's Party
- Hjördis Gille as Woman in Broköping
- Karin Granberg as Guest at Tora's Party
- Wilhelm Haqvinius as Man at the Meeting
- John Hilke as Man at the Meeting
- Per Hugo Jacobsson as Man at the Meeting
- Helge Kihlberg as Man in Broköping
- Signe Lundberg-Settergren as Guest at Tora's Party
- Hugo Lundström as Customer at the Hairdresser's
- Wilma Malmlöf as Curious Lady at the Square
- Anna Olin as Vicar's Wife
- Knut Pehrson as Juror
- Algot Persson as Man at the Meeting
- Olav Riégo as Guest at Tora's Party
- Erik Rosén as Professor Sköldvall
- Anna-Lisa Ryding as Young Woman
- Holger Sjöberg as Guest at Tora's Party
- Georg Skarstedt as Guest at Tora's Party
- Ingeborg Strandin as In Broköping
- Ruth Weijden as Melin's Housemaid
- John Westin as Juror
- Lisa Wirström as Guest at Carolina Berg's Dinner

== Bibliography ==
- Jutta Jacobi. Zarah Leander: das Leben einer Diva. Hoffmann und Campe, 2006.
