= August Lindberg (actor) =

Swedish actor, stage director and theatre manager

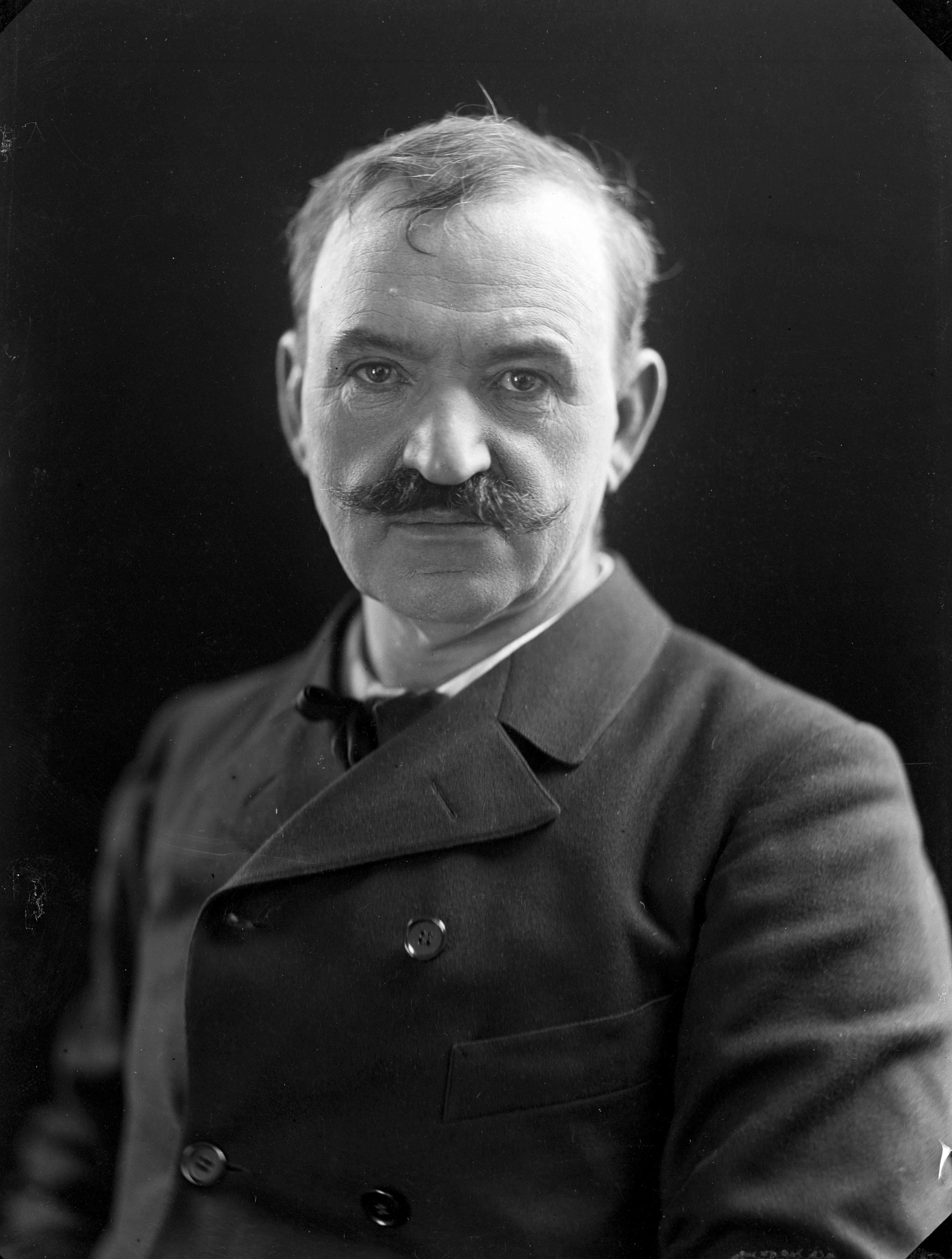
- Lindberg in 1906
- Born: Johan August Lindberg; 3 September 1846; Hedemora, Dalarna, Sweden
- Died: November 18, 1916 (aged 70); Råsunda, Stockholm, Sweden
- Occupations: actor, director, theatre manager
- Years active: 1866–1915
- Known for: Hamlet, The Tempest, Faust

Johan August Lindberg (3 September 1846 – 18 November 1916) was a Swedish actor, stage director and theatre manager.

== Biography ==
Lindberg was born at Hedemora in Dalarna, Sweden. He was the son of Carl Fr. Lindberg and his wife Kristina Jansdotter. He moved to Stockholm and first work at the Blå porten restaurant and cafe in Djurgården. In 1865, he the Royal Dramatic Training Academy where he remain until the spring of 1866. After graduation, Lindberg was employed by the traveling theater company operated by Carl Otto Lindmark (1830-1901).

Lindberg played at almost all of the major theatres in Sweden, including the Swedish Theatre and the Royal Dramatic Theatre in Stockholm, and several times toured the provinces with travelling theatre companies. His acting was characterized by his strange diction and his eccentric ways, and he was often mimicked, but in spite of this was considered one of the country's foremost actors. Lindberg is most famous for his rendition of Hamlet, which he played countless times during his career, and he also played all of the other great Shakespeare parts. As a theatre manager he was among the first to introduce the plays of Henrik Ibsen in Sweden, and with his one-man interpretations of plays such as Shakespeare's The Tempest and Goethe's Faust, he toured Sweden and the United States.

== Personal life ==
Lindberg was married to actress Augusta Lindberg (1866–1943) and was the father of author Stina Bergman (1888–1976), director Per Lindberg (1890–1944) and Greta Lindberg (1886–1978). He was the father-in-law of playwright Hjalmar Bergman who was married to his daughter, Stina Bergman.

== Other sources ==
- Collijn, Gustaf (1942). "Svensk skådespelarkonst kring sekelskiftet". In Wettergren, Erik; Lignell, Ivar (eds.). Svensk scenkonst och film. Band 1 (in Swedish). Stockholm: Svensk litteratur.
- Svanberg, Johannes (1918). Kungl. teatrarne under ett halft sekel 1860-1910: personalhistoriska anteckningar. Band 2: Sceniska konstnärer 1866-1888 (in Swedish). Stockholm: Nordisk familjebok.
