= Charles Francis Keary =

English scholar and novelist (1848–1917)

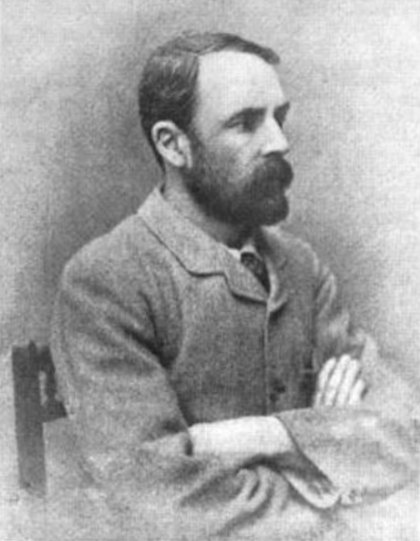
- In The Sketch, 18 December 1895
- Born: 29 March 1848; Trent Vale, England
- Died: 25 October 1917 (aged 69); London, England
- Education: Marlborough College; Trinity College, Cambridge
- Occupations: Scholar, historian

Charles Francis Keary (29 March 1848 – 25 October 1917) was an English scholar and historian. His later work as a novelist influenced the modernist writer James Joyce. However, the English novelist George Gissing read four of Keary's works, including three novels, in the first 31 days of 1896, and found the novel Herbert Vanlennert, "a long, conscientious, uninspired book".

== Early life ==
Charles was born in Trent Vale on 29 March 1848, to a Galway Irish family which had settled in the industrial Midlands borough of Stoke-on-Trent. He was the son of William Keary, who in 1874 would become Stoke-on-Trent's first mayor. He was schooled at Marlborough College and took his degree at Trinity College, Cambridge.

== Specialisms ==
Keary then became fascinated by Scandinavian history and primitive mythology, then a promising new academic field, and wrote a number of scholarly books on such topics: The Vikings in Western Christendom (1890) stood as a standard work for many decades. He also became expert on Norway and the Norwegians, and knew many poets and writers there.

Keary worked from 1872 to 1887 at the Department of Coins at The British Museum in London, where he wrote and published A Catalogue Of English Coins In The British Museum: Anglo-Saxon Series (1887) with Herbert Appold Grueber, and contributed scholarly articles on coins to numismatic journals. Keary was awarded the Medal of the Royal Numismatic Society in 1894. During his time at the British Museum he was the best friend of Francis Ysidro Edgeworth, the Anglo-Irish philosopher.

== Literature ==
Keary then turned from coins and history to ambitious literary novels, influenced by the Russian novelists of the time. These works were unusual, using a lack of conventional structure in an attempt to suggest the chaos of reality, allied to close observation and a dispassionate approach to character. His novel The Two Lancrofts (1893) follows literary life from Oxford University to the Paris of Balzac and Zola. Herbert Vanlennart (1896) rested on his tour of India, which he had written up in the short travel book India: Impressions (1903). His later novel Bloomsbury (1905) drew on his experiences amid the "curious neurotic intellectualism" (The Spectator review, 8 April 1905) of London literary circles in the Bloomsbury of the late 1880s and early 1890s. At that time, under the pseudonym H. Ogram Matuce, he published a radically impressionistic prose work, The Wanderer: From the papers of the late H. Ogram Matuce (1888). In a 4 September 1909 Spectator review of his later novel The Mount, it is remembered that "for some of us the publication of Mr. C. F. Keary's The Wanderer over twenty years ago was an event."

Keary tried the then-fashionable form of verse drama, with The Brothers: a Fairy Masque (1902) and Rigel: a Mystery (1904), and moved with more success into philosophy with The Pursuit of Reason (Cambridge University Press, 1910). After an untimely death from a heart attack in London on 25 October 1917, one further book appeared: The Posthumous Poems of C. F. Keary (1923). However, the timing of his death, amid the full clamour of World War I, hastened his slide into almost total obscurity.

His collection of short works with weird and horrific elements, Twixt Dog and Wolf (1901), is known to have influenced James Joyce's novel Dubliners (1905) – as evinced in a letter from Joyce dated 24 September 1905. Twixt Dog and Wolf was described by fantasy historian Douglas A. Anderson as containing "literary weird fiction of a high order."

== Music ==
Keary wrote the libretto for the opera Koanga (1904) by the composer Frederick Delius, with whom he had detailed discussions, but the collaboration was short and fraught, and led to no further work between them. Keary based the character Sophus Jonsen in his novel The Journalist on Delius. The itinerant musician Hauch from the same novel is based on the Norwegian violinist and composer Halfdan Jebe.

Keary's sister was the Staffordshire folklorist and folk-song collector Alice Annie Keary, a close friend of the major folklorist Charlotte Sophia Burne. Keary himself travelled in Europe and dabbled there in folk-song collecting, publishing articles such as "Roumanian Peasants and their Songs".

== Selected works ==
- The Dawn of History, 1878
- The Mythology of the Eddas, 1880
- Outlines of primitive belief among the Indo-European races, 1882
- The Morphology of Coins, 1886
- The Vikings in Western Christendom, A.D. 789 to A.D. 888, 1891
- Norway and the Norwegians, 1892
- The Two Lancrofts, 1893
- Herbert Vanlennert, 1895
- The Journalist, 1898
- The Pursuit of Reason, 1910

== Sources ==
- Atkinson, Damian (23 September 2004). "Keary, Charles Francis". Oxford Dictionary of National Biography (online ed.). Oxford University Press. doi:10.1093/ref:odnb/61037. (Subscription, Wikipedia Library access or UK public library membership required.)
- "Mr. C. F. Keary". The Times. 27 October 1917. p. 9 – via Gale.
- "Charles F. Keary Dies". The New York Times. London (published 28 October 1917). 27 October 1917. p. 21 – via Newspapers.com.
