= Dressed to Thrill =

1935 film by Harry Lachman

- Directed by: Harry Lachman
- Screenplay by: Samson Raphaelson; Alfred Savoir (play)
- Produced by: Robert Kane
- Starring: Tutta Rolf; Clive Brook; Robert Barrat; Nydia Westman; Dina Smirnova
- Cinematography: Rudolph Maté
- Music by: Peter Brunelli; Louis De Francesco
- Production company: Fox Film Corporation
- Distributed by: 20th Century-Fox
- Release date: August 16, 1935
- Running time: 68 minutes
- Country: United States
- Language: English

Dressed to Thrill is a 1935 American musical film directed by Harry Lachman and written by Samson Raphaelson. The film stars Tutta Rolf, Clive Brook, Robert Barrat, Nydia Westman and Dina Smirnova. The film was released on August 16, 1935, by Fox Film Corporation.

It was a remake of the 1932 French film The Dressmaker of Luneville which had also been directed by Lachman.

== Cast ==
- Tutta Rolf as Colette Dubois / Nadia Petrova
- Clive Brook as Bill Trent
- Robert Barrat as Gaston Dupont
- Nydia Westman as Anne Trepied
- Dina Smirnova as Sonya
- George Hassell as Henri
- G.P. Huntley as Charles Penfield
- Leonid Snegoff as Raskolnikoff
- Lionel Belmore as Pierre
- Jack Mower as American Officer
- Fred Malatesta as Italian Captain
- Jean De Briac as French Soldier
- Alec Craig as Scottish Soldier
- Billy Bevan as Canadian Soldier
