= Ruth Stevens =

Swedish actress

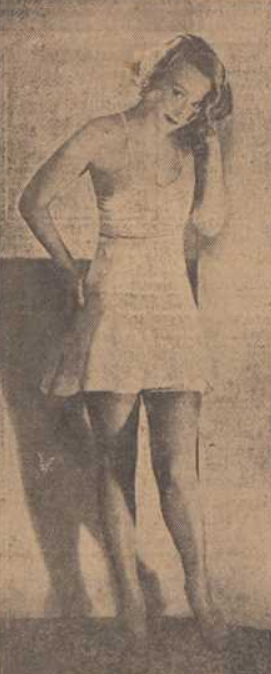
- Stevens onstage in Grand Hotel (1933)
- Born: Ruth Astrid Frideborg Nilsson; 21 March 1903; Norrköping, Sweden
- Died: 27 March 1989 (aged 86); Stockholm, Sweden
- Other name: Ruth Roeck-Hansen
- Occupation: Actress
- Years active: 1931–1989 (film)
- Spouses: Gösta Stevens (m. 1928; div. 1933) Harry Roeck-Hansen (m. 1946; died 1959)

Ruth Stevens (born Ruth Astrid Frideborg Nilsson; 21 March 1903 – 27 March 1989) was a Swedish stage and film actress. She was generally cast playing degenerate young woman. She was married to the film director Gösta Stevens and the actor Harry Roeck-Hansen.

== Selected filmography ==
- Skipper's Love (1931)
- Love and Deficit (1932)
- Black Roses (1932)
- Dear Relatives (1933)
- Wife for a Day (1933)
- A Wedding Night at Stjarnehov (1934)
- He, She and the Money (1936)
- It Pays to Advertise (1936)
- Witches' Night (1937)
- Career (1938)
- Circus (1939)
- If I Could Marry the Minister (1941)
- The Yellow Clinic (1942)

== Bibliography ==
- Iverson, Gunnar, Soderbergh Widding, Astrid & Soila, Tytti. Nordic National Cinemas. Routledge, 2005.
