= Benkt-Åke Benktsson =

Swedish actor (1907–1957)

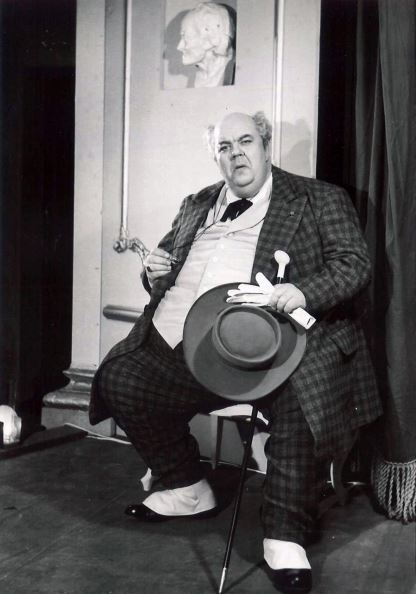
- Born: 6 January 1907; Halmstad, Sweden
- Died: 8 January 1957 (aged 50); Malmö, Sweden
- Occupation: Actor
- Years active: 1926-1957

Benkt-Åke Benktsson (6 January 1907 – 8 January 1957) was a Swedish film actor. He was born in Halmstad, Sweden and died in Malmö, Sweden.

== Filmography ==
Year	Title	Role	Notes
1926	Flickorna på Solvik	Ola Rundström	
1934	En stilla flirt	Mr. Wilder	Uncredited
1934	Eva Goes Aboard	Lundberg	Uncredited
1935	Ungkarlspappan	Swedish Counsel in Barcelona	Uncredited
1936	South of the Highway	Truls	
1938	Vi som går scenvägen	Lasse	
1939	Rosor varje kväll	Wikström	
1940	Vi Masthuggspojkar	Viktor	
1941	We're All Errand Boys	Grossh. Nordin	
1941	Pinocchio	Stromboli & The Coachman	Voice (Swedish original dub)
1942	Stinsen på Lyckås	Priest	
1944	Skåningar	Mårten Esbjörnsson	
1946	The Balloon	The Calif	
1946	It Rains on Our Love	The Prosecutor	
1948	Med kärlek och solsken och sång	Britt's Father	
1948	Lilla Märta kommer tillbaka eller Grevinnans snedsteg eller Den vilda jakten efter det hemliga dokumentet	Dr. Bauerbrecht	
1949	Sjösalavår	Elvira's Father	
1949	Pippi Longstocking	Efraim Långstrump	
1955	Dreams	Mr. Magnus	
1957	The Seventh Seal	Merchant at the inn	Uncredited
