= Dear Relatives =

1933 film

- Directed by: Gustaf Molander
- Written by: Gösta Stevens; Gustaf Molander
- Based on: Den kære familie by Gustav Esmann
- Produced by: Stellan Claësson
- Starring: Gösta Ekman; Tutta Rolf; Carl Barcklind
- Cinematography: Åke Dahlqvist
- Edited by: Rolf Husberg
- Music by: Jules Sylvain
- Production company: Svensk Filmindustri
- Distributed by: Svensk Filmindustri
- Release date: 25 October 1933
- Running time: 94 minutes
- Country: Sweden
- Language: Swedish

Dear Relatives (Swedish: Kära släkten) is a 1933 Swedish comedy film directed by Gustaf Molander and starring Gösta Ekman, Tutta Rolf and Carl Barcklind. Molander also co-wrote the screenplay with Gösta Stevens. The film was a hit at the box office. It was made at the Råsunda Studios in Stockholm. The film's sets were designed by the art director Arne Åkermark.

== Synopsis ==
The plot revolves around a wealthy wholesaler, his three daughters and their husbands. While two of his sons-in-law are doing very well, the third is an impoverished nobleman married to his daughter Lilli. They attempt to boost their fortunes by opening a nightclub.

== Cast ==
- Gösta Ekman as Claes af Leijonstam
- Tutta Rolf as Lilli af Leijonstam
- Carl Barcklind as Mr. Friis
- Thor Modéen as Filip Randel
- Edvin Adolphson as Ludwig
- Dora Söderberg as Tyra
- Sickan Carlsson as Marianne Friis
- Georg Rydeberg as Erik Cronskiöld
- Åke Jensen as Valdemar Nyström
- Ruth Stevens as Sally
- Eric Abrahamsson as Karlsson
- Oscar Byström as Adolf
- Tord Bernheim as Dancing man at Kragknappen
- Wiola Brunius as Young woman at Kragknappen
- Alice Carlsson as Young woman at Kragknappen
- Sigge Fürst as Dancing man at Kragknappen
- Nils Hultgren as Count Cronskiöld's servant

== Bibliography ==
- Elkington, Author Trevor. Transnational Cinema in a Global North: Nordic Cinema in Transition. Wayne State University Press, 2005.
- Wright, Rochelle. The Visible Wall: Jews and Other Ethnic Outsiders in Swedish Film. SIU Press, 1998.
