= Variety Is the Spice of Life =

1939 Swedish film

- Directed by: Gustaf Molander
- Written by: Leo Lenz (play); Robert Arthur Schönherr (play); Gösta Stevens
- Starring: Tutta Rolf; Per Aabel; Elsa Burnett
- Cinematography: Elner Åkesson
- Music by: Gunnar Johansson; Jules Sylvain
- Production company: Svensk Filmindustri
- Distributed by: Svensk Filmindustri
- Release date: 22 March 1939
- Running time: 79 minutes
- Country: Sweden
- Language: Swedish

Variety Is the Spice of Life (Swedish: Ombyte förnöjer) is a 1939 Swedish comedy film directed by Gustaf Molander and starring Tutta Rolf, Per Aabel and Elsa Burnett.

The film's sets were designed by Arne Åkermark. It was based on a play which was also turned into a German film Marriage in Small Doses the same year.

== Synopsis ==
When her composer husband loses interest in her, an ordinary housewife turns into a seductive vamp to try and win back his affections.

== Main cast ==
- Tutta Rolf as Mrs. Vera Ivanow
- Per Aabel as Gregor Ivanow
- Elsa Burnett as Monica Falk
- Ernst Eklund as Uncle Ludvig
- Anna-Lisa Baude as Maria, maid
- Carl-Gunnar Wingård as Night Porter

== Bibliography ==
- Mariah Larsson & Anders Marklund. Swedish Film: An Introduction and Reader. Nordic Academic Press, 2010.
