= Sigbjørn Bernhoft Osa =

Norwegian musician (1910–1990)

- Born: 3 May 1910; Ulvik Municipality, Norway
- Died: 2 February 1990 (aged 79)
- Occupations: Fiddler and traditional folk musician
- Children: Liv Bernhoft Osa
- Parents: Lars Osa (father); Hermine Bernhoft-Osa (mother)
- Awards: Arts Council Norway Honorary Award (1976); Spellemannprisen (1973)

Sigbjørn Bernhoft Osa (3 May 1910 – 2 February 1990) was a Norwegian fiddler and traditional folk musician. He was one of the best known Norwegian performers of folk music in the 1900s.

== Personal life ==
Osa was born in Ulvik Municipality in Hardanger as the son of fiddler and painter Lars Osa and children's writer Hermine Bernhoft-Osa. He spent his first years in Valle Municipality in Setesdal, and moved to Voss Municipality when he was six years old. He was married to Kersti Alice Grambo from 1937, and to Anne Heggtveit from 1950. He was the father of actress Liv Bernhoft Osa (b. 1957). He died in Voss in 1990.

== Career ==
Osa's father was a skilled violin and hardingfele player and Osa learned to play both instruments starting when he was six. He studied violin with Bjarne Brustad in Oslo then with the academy of Musikselskabet Harmoniens orkester in Bergen from 1929 to 1930. He continued his violin studies with de:Siegfried Eberhardt in Berlin from 1931 to 1932.

He made his début as violinist in 1937. He started playing on the radio with the Norwegian Broadcasting Corporation in the 1940s and recorded more than 350 traditional airs (Norwegian: slått) on either hardingfele or violin between 1948 and 1978. His airs were often based on the Voss tradition from elder fiddlers such as Sjur Helgeland, Ola Mosafinn or his own father. He often toured in Norway, Europe and the United States with concerts or causeries.

He composed a concerto for hardingfele, Three Fjords, in cooperation with Geirr Tveitt. In 1973 he recorded the track "Texas-låt" on an album with the rock group "Saft." He published the textbook Hardingfela in 1952.

He became an Honorary Citizen of the U.S. state of Washington in 1968. He received the Arts Council Norway Honorary Award in 1976. He also received the Spellemannprisen Honorary Prize in 1973.

== Selected works ==
- Hardingfela (1952) textbook
- Spelmannsliv (1979) autobiography (with Jostein Mæland)

Awards
Preceded by Ingeborg Refling Hagen	Recipient of the Norsk kulturråds ærespris 1976	Succeeded by Ella Hval
