= Hanna in Society =

1940 film

- Directed by: Gunnar Olsson
- Written by: Torsten Flodén; Erik Zetterström
- Starring: Rut Holm; Carl Barcklind; Elsa Carlsson
- Cinematography: Sven Thermænius
- Edited by: Wic Kjellin
- Music by: Erik Baumann; Kai Gullmar; Nathan Görling
- Production company: Europafilm
- Release date: 4 November 1940
- Running time: 87 minutes
- Country: Sweden
- Language: Swedish

Hanna in Society (Swedish: Hanna i societén) is a 1940 Swedish comedy film directed by Gunnar Olsson and starring Rut Holm, Carl Barcklind and Elsa Carlsson.

The film's art direction was by Max Linder and Bibi Lindström.

== Cast ==
- Rut Holm as Hanna Lundström
- Carl Barcklind as Col. Rutger Hummerberg
- Elsa Carlsson as Lucie Hummerberg
- Einar Axelsson as Baltzar Hummerberg
- Dagmar Ebbesen as Kristin
- Bengt Djurberg as El-Johansson
- Eivor Landström as Monika Hummerberg
- Åke Ohberg as Lawyer
- Karl-Arne Holmsten as Gösta Björnberg
- Sven-Bertil Norberg as Douglas
- Stig Järrel as Journalist
- Hugo Björne as Ludvig Hummerberg
- Harry Roeck-Hansen as Adolf Hummerberg
- Barbro Flodquist as Kitti
- Bengt Ekerot as Fred Hummerberg
- Kaj Hjelm as Bertil
- Arne Lindblad as Hairdresser
- Eric Fröling as Lunder
- Alli Halling as Charlotte
- Ragnar Falck as Knäppis
- Carl Ström as Man
- Julie Bernby as Woman at the beauty shop
- Georg Blickingberg as Dr. Santesson
- Julia Cæsar as Representative for the Housemaid's Association
- Karin Lannby as Woman at the hat department
- Vera Lindby as Woman dancing with Johansson
- Gunnar Olsson as Sundin
- Manetta Ryberg as Woman at the tea party

== Bibliography ==
- Alfred Krautz. International directory of cinematographers, set- and costume designers in film, Volume 5. Saur, 1986.
