= The Unicorn (1955 film) =

1955 film

- Directed by: Gustaf Molander
- Written by: Sigfrid Siwertz (short story); Gustaf Molander; Gösta Stevens
- Produced by: Allan Ekelund
- Starring: Inga Tidblad; Birger Malmsten; Edvin Adolphson
- Cinematography: Martin Bodin
- Edited by: Oscar Rosander
- Music by: Lars-Erik Larsson
- Production company: Svensk Filmindustri
- Distributed by: Svensk Filmindustri
- Release date: 3 October 1955
- Running time: 98 minutes
- Country: Sweden
- Language: Swedish

The Unicorn (Swedish: Enhörningen) is a 1955 Swedish drama film directed by Gustaf Molander and starring Inga Tidblad, Birger Malmsten and Edvin Adolphson. It was shot at the Råsunda Studios in Stockholm. The film's sets were designed by the art director P.A. Lundgren.

== Cast ==
- Inga Tidblad as Harriet Allard
- Birger Malmsten as Christer Allard
- Edvin Adolphson as Claes von Klitzow
- Olof Bergström as Frank Allard
- Sture Lagerwall as Ossian Liewenskiöld
- Kristina Adolphson as Louise von Klitzow
- Isa Quensel as Harriet's Mother
- Hans Strååt as Harriet's Father
- Helge Hagerman as Police Inspector
- Catrin Westerlund as Maria, Allard's housewife
- Svea Holst as Kristin, Allard's housewife
- Märta Dorff as Anna, nurse
- Annalisa Ericson as Agneta Wollter
- Elsa Ebbesen as Mina, Harriet's parent's housewife
- Ivar Wahlgren as Speaker at Frank's party
- Olav Riégo as Hospital doctor
- Claes Thelander as Priest
- Gunvor Pontén as Woman at the ball
- Gösta Prüzelius as Officer at the ball
- Curt Löwgren as Waiter at the Operabaren

== Bibliography ==
- Qvist, Per Olov & von Bagh, Peter. Guide to the Cinema of Sweden and Finland. Greenwood Publishing Group, 2000.
