= Paramount on Parade =

1930 pre-Code revue film

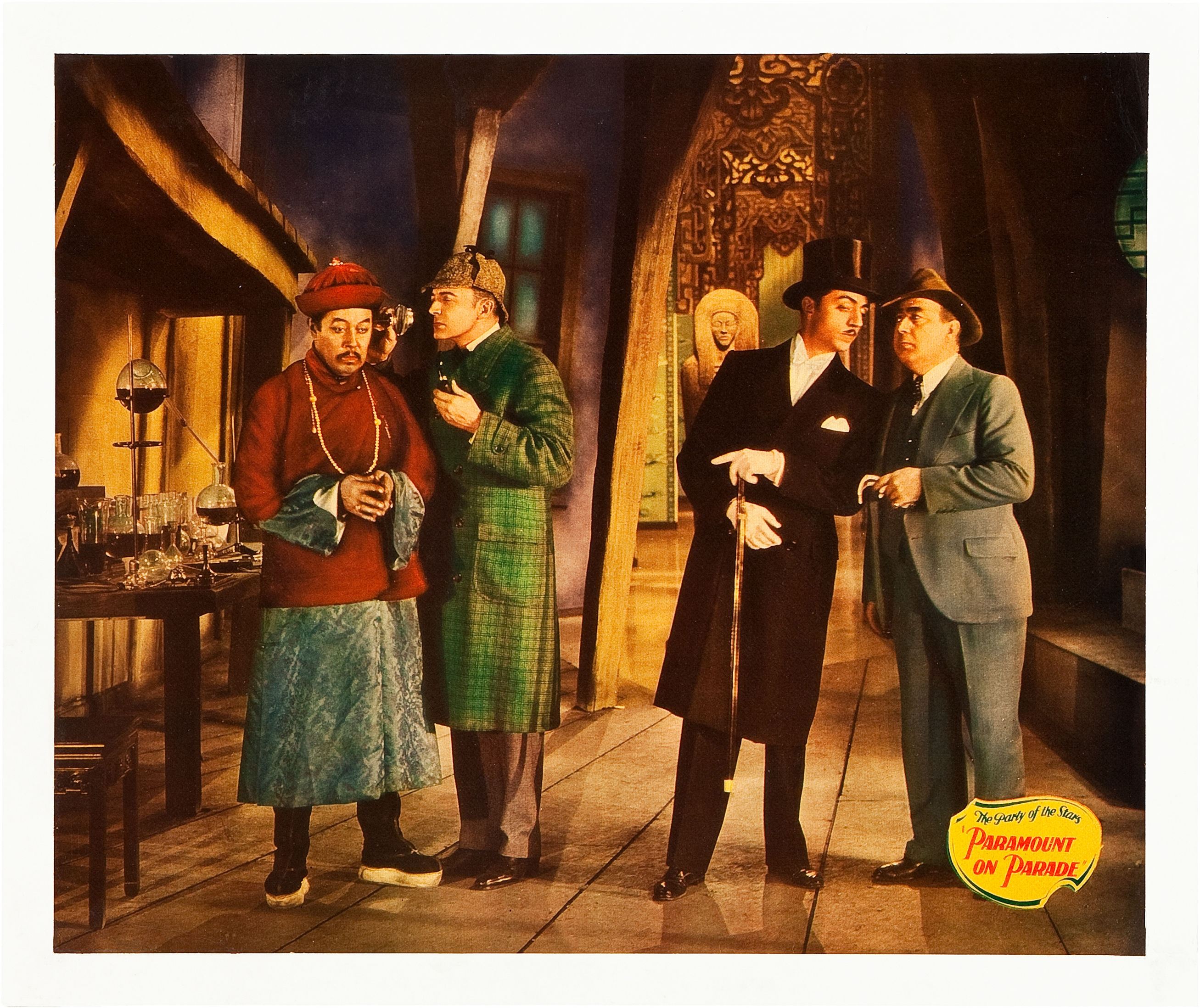
- Warner Oland, Clive Brook, William Powell and Eugene Pallette in the "Murder Will Out" sequence
- Directed by: Edmund Goulding and 10 other directors
- Written by: Joseph L. Mankiewicz
- Produced by: Jesse L. Lasky; Adolph Zukor; Albert S. Kaufman; Elsie Janis; B. P. Schulberg
- Starring: Jean Arthur; Richard Arlen; George Bancroft; Clara Bow; Evelyn Brent; Mary Brian; Nancy Carroll; Leon Errol; Maurice Chevalier; Gary Cooper; Kay Francis; Richard "Skeets" Gallagher; James Hall; Helen Kane; Fredric March; Nino Martini; Jack Oakie; William Powell; Charles "Buddy" Rogers; Lillian Roth; Fay Wray
- Cinematography: Victor Milner; Harry Fischbeck
- Edited by: Merrill G. White
- Music by: Harold Jackson; Richard A. Whiting; Elsie Janis; Ballard MacDonald
- Distributed by: Paramount Pictures
- Release date: April 22, 1930
- Running time: 102 minutes
- Country: United States
- Language: English

Paramount on Parade is a 1930 all-star American pre-Code revue released by Paramount Pictures, directed by several directors including Edmund Goulding, Dorothy Arzner, Ernst Lubitsch, Rowland V. Lee, A. Edward Sutherland, Lothar Mendes, Otto Brower, Edwin H. Knopf, Frank Tuttle, and Victor Schertzinger—all supervised by the production supervisor, singer, actress, and songwriter Elsie Janis.

Featured stars included Jean Arthur, Richard Arlen, Clara Bow, Evelyn Brent, Charles "Buddy" Rogers, Jack Oakie, Helen Kane, Maurice Chevalier, Nancy Carroll, George Bancroft, Kay Francis, Richard "Skeets" Gallagher, Gary Cooper, Fay Wray, Lillian Roth and other Paramount stars. The screenplay was written by Joseph L. Mankiewicz, produced by Adolph Zukor and Jesse L. Lasky, with cinematography by Victor Milner and Harry Fischbeck.

== Production ==
Paramount on Parade, released on April 22, 1930, was Paramount's answer to all-star revues like Hollywood Revue of 1929 from Metro-Goldwyn-Mayer, The Show of Shows from Warner Bros., and King of Jazz from Universal Studios. The film had 20 individual segments—several of them in two-color Technicolor — directed by 11 directors, and almost every star on the Paramount roster except Marlene Dietrich, Emil Jannings, Claudette Colbert, Jeanette MacDonald and the Marx Brothers. (Colbert became a star in May 1930 with the release of The Big Pond, also with Chevalier and also released in a French-language version. MacDonald’s duet with Nino Martini is in the French version of the film, but was reshot for the English language version.) Cecil B. DeMille was also not involved in the revue as he had moved to Metro-Goldwyn-Mayer in 1928 and would not return until 1932 to direct The Sign of the Cross.

=== International versions ===
Paramount also produced a Spanish-language version titled Galas de la Paramount starring Barry Norton, Ramon Pereda and Rosita Moreno; a French-language version, Paramount en parade, directed by Charles de Rochefort; and a Romanian-language version Parada Paramount (Chevalier and Martini also starred in the French version, and Romanian actress Pola Illéry starred in the Romanian version). There was also a Dutch version, Paramount op Parade with Theo Frenkel, and a Scandinavian version starring Ernst Rolf and his wife, Tutta Rolf.

== Preservation status ==
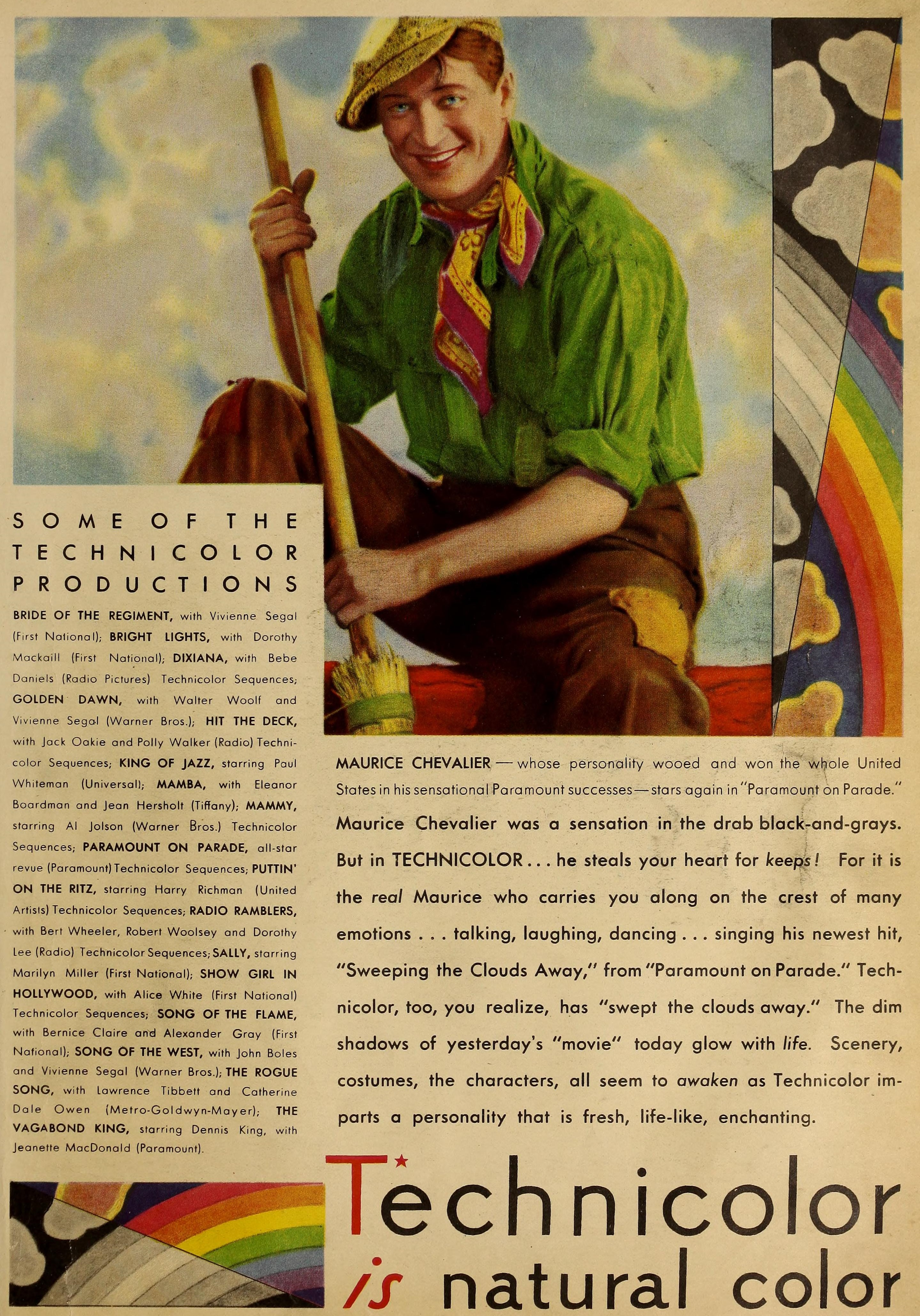
Paramount on Parade featured in a 1930 advertisement for Technicolor

The film, including some of its Technicolor sequences, has been restored by the UCLA Film and Television Archive. The original title sequence and chorus girl number immediately following it, however, are still lost. The sound for two of the Technicolor sequences ("Gallows Song" and "Dream Girl") are also missing.

According to Robert Gitt, film archivist now retired from UCLA, in a lecture at Pacific Film Archive at UC Berkeley, the film was also released with sound-on-disc for those theaters not equipped for sound-on-film. The archive had a report of the soundtrack for this film still existing on disc until the 1994 Northridge earthquake destroyed a set of discs that a collector was planning to donate.

In August 2010, CapitolFest in Rome, New York showed a 102-minute version restored by UCLA Film and Television Archive. Some sequences are still missing the sound, for some sequences only the soundtrack exists.

== List of sequences ==
- "Title Sequence" during Credits with Kay Francis and George Bancroft (lost footage; only sound survives)
- "Showgirls on Parade" with Mitzi Mayfair (lost Technicolor footage; only sound survives)
- "We're the Masters of Ceremony" Jack Oakie, Richard "Skeets" Gallagher, and Leon Errol introduce themselves as MC's of the film
- "Love Time" Charles "Buddy" Rogers and Lillian Roth
- "Murder Will Out" William Powell, Clive Brook, Warner Oland, Eugene Pallette, and Oakie
- "Origin of the Apache" Maurice Chevalier and Evelyn Brent do a parody of an Apache dance
- "Song of the Gondolier" Nino Martini sings "Come Back to Sorrento" (Technicolor; survives complete)
- "In a Hospital" Leon Errol, Jean Arthur, Phillips Holmes, and David Newell
- "In a Girl's Gym" Jack Oakie, and Zelma O'Neal
- "The Toreador" Kay Francis and Harry Green (as Isadore the Toreador) parody Carmen (Technicolor; survives complete)
- "The Montmartre Girl" Ruth Chatterton, Stu Erwin, Fredric March, Stanley Smith, Jack Pennick
- "Park in Paris" Maurice Chevalier
- "Mitzi Herself" Mitzi Green
- "The Schoolroom" Helen Kane, Mitzi Green. Kane sings "What Did Cleopatra Say?" to her class
- "The Gallows Song" Skeets Gallagher and Dennis King (Technicolor footage survives; sound missing, current prints use King's commercial vocal recording of the song.)
- "Dance Mad" Nancy Carroll and Abe Lyman's Band
- "Dream Girl" Richard Arlen, Jean Arthur, Mary Brian, James Hall, Gary Cooper, and Fay Wray sing "Let Us Drink To The Girl Of My Dreams" (Technicolor footage survives; sound missing)
- "The Redhead" Clara Bow, and 42 Navy men sing "True to the Navy"
- "Impulses" George Bancroft, Kay Francis, and Cecil Cunningham
- "Rainbow Revels" finale Chevalier and girls' chorus (including Iris Adrian and Virginia Bruce) sing "Sweeping the Clouds Away" (in Technicolor; survives only in black-and-white)

== Foreign-language versions ==
A large number of foreign-language versions were shot including:

- Galas de Paramount (Spanish) premiered in New York in early August, 1930, in Buenos Aires August 28, 1930 and in Los Angeles September 7, 1930; with Ramón Pereda, Barry Norton, Rosita Moreno as hosts to sequences from the original version and new sequences featuring Juan Pulido, Ernesto Vilches, Albertina Rasch as well as Nino Martini and Mitzi Green in both new and original-version segments.
- Paramount en parade (French) with Maurice Chevalier, Nino Martini, Jeanette MacDonald, Saint-Granier, Marguerite Moreno, Louis-Jacques Boucot, Fanny Clair, and Charles de Rochefort (Rochefort also directed)
- Parada Paramount (Romanian) with Pola Illéry; directed by Rochefort
- Paramount op Parade (Dutch) with Theo Frenkel Jr., Mien Duymaer van Twist, and Louis Davids; directed by Job Weening

At Paramount's Hollywood studio, Ernst Rolf and his Norwegian wife, Tutta Rolf, filmed introductions and sequences for the Scandinavian version. Japanese comedian Suisei Matsui introduced the film in Japan. Mira Zimińska and Mariusz Maszynski appeared in the Polish version, and Dina Gralla and Eugen Rex appeared in the German version. Paramount filmed most of the above versions, along with Czech, Hungarian, Serbian, and Italian versions, at their Joinville Studios in Paris.

== See also ==
- List of early color feature films
- Multiple-language version
- The House That Shadows Built (1931 promotional film released by Paramount)
