= Thomas Graal's Ward =

1922 film

- Directed by: Gustaf Molander
- Written by: Gustaf Molander
- Starring: Einar Axelsson; Vera Schmiterlöw; Nils Aréhn
- Cinematography: Adrian Bjurman
- Edited by: Adrian Bjurman
- Production company: Wahlströms förlag
- Distributed by: Fredrik Andersons Filmbyrå
- Release date: 9 October 1922
- Running time: 86 minutes
- Country: Sweden
- Languages: Silent; Swedish intertitles

Thomas Graal's Ward (Swedish: Thomas Graals myndling) is a 1922 Swedish silent drama film written and directed by Gustaf Molander and starring Einar Axelsson, Vera Schmiterlöw and Nils Aréhn.

== Cast ==
- Einar Axelsson as Paul
- Vera Schmiterlöw as Babette
- Nils Aréhn as Thomas Graal
- Carl Browallius as Elias Jesperson
- Olof Molander as Baron Zoll
- Torsten Winge as Student
- Harry Roeck Hansen as Student
- Semmy Friedmann as Student
- Eugen Nilsson as Head Waiter
- Georg Blomstedt as Policeman
- Josua Bengtson as Conductor
- Gull Natorp as Lady with Piano
- Georg Fernqvist as Servant
- Ragnar Arvedson as Restaurant Guest
- Tekla Sjöblom as Landlady
- Waldemar Wohlström as Landlady's Husband
- Hilda Castegren as Woman with a Sheep
- Gösta Alexandersson as Rowdy Boy
- Edvin Adolphson as Restaurant Guest
- John Westin as Restaurant Guest

== Bibliography ==
- Gustafsson, Tommy. Masculinity in the Golden Age of Swedish Cinema: A Cultural Analysis of 1920s Films. McFarland, 2014.
- Qvist, Per Olov & von Bagh, Peter. Guide to the Cinema of Sweden and Finland. Greenwood Publishing Group, 2000.
