= Tutta Rolf =

Norwegian-Swedish actress (1907–1994)

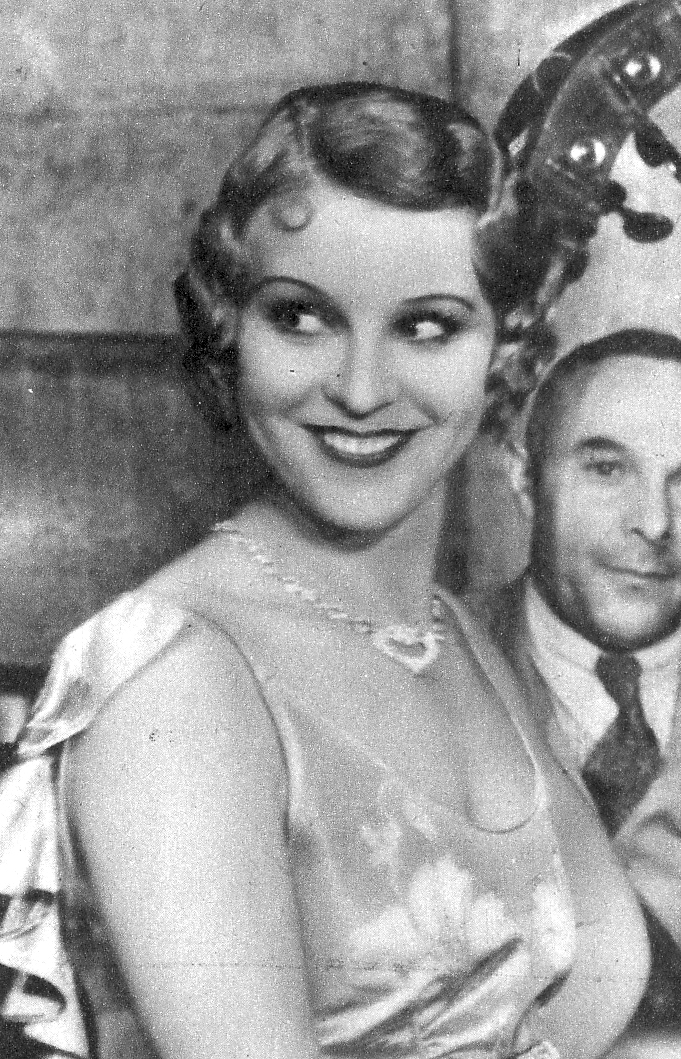
- Tutta Rolf in 1930.
- Born: Solveig Jenny Berntzen; 7 October 1907; Kristiania, Norway
- Died: 26 October 1994 (aged 87); Los Angeles, United States
- Occupations: Actress, singer
- Years active: 1932–1939
- Spouses: Ernst Rolf; (m. 1930–1932) Jack Donohue (m. 1936–1950): Hasse Ekman; (m. 1953–1972)
- Children: Tom Rolf, Jill Donohue

Tutta Rolf (born Solveig Jenny Berntzen; 7 October 1907 – 26 October 1994) was a Norwegian-Swedish film and theatre actress and singer. She was born in Oslo. She appeared in 14 films between 1932 and 1939. She was married three times, first to the Swedish actor and singer Ernst Rolf (1930–1932), then to the American director Jack Donohue (1936–1950), and finally to the Swedish director/actor Hasse Ekman (1953–1972). She was the mother of the Academy Award–winning film editor Tom Rolf and the actress Jill Donohue.

== Selected filmography ==
- Paramount on Parade (1930) with husband Ernst Rolf in the Scandinavian version
- Servant's Entrance (1932)
- Lucky Devils (1932)
- Love and Deficit (1932)
- Dear Relatives (1933)
- Fasters millioner (1934)
- En stille flirt (1933)
- En stilla flirt (1934)
- Under False Flag (1935)
- Dressed to Thrill (1935)
- Swedenhielms (1935)
- Adventure (1936)
- Sara Learns Manners (1937)
- The Great Love (1938)
- Dollar (1938)
- Variety Is the Spice of Life (1939)
- Whalers (1939)
