= Anna-Clara and Her Brothers =

1923 film

- Directed by: Per Lindberg
- Written by: Hans Zetterström (novel); Hjalmar Bergman
- Produced by: Stellan Claësson; Karin Swanström
- Starring: Ann Britt Ohlson; Carl Browallius; Hilda Borgström; Linnéa Hillberg
- Cinematography: Ragnar Westfelt
- Production company: Bonnierfilm
- Distributed by: Svenska Filmkompaniet
- Release date: 19 November 1923
- Running time: 65 minutes
- Country: Sweden
- Languages: Silent; Swedish intertitles

Anna-Clara and Her Brothers (Swedish: Anna-Clara och hennes bröder) is a 1923 Swedish silent drama film directed by Per Lindberg and starring Ann Britt Ohlson, Carl Browallius, Hilda Borgström and Linnéa Hillberg.

== Cast ==
- Ann Britt Ohlson as Anna-Clara
- Stig Herlitz as Emmanuel
- Carl Browallius as Anna-Clara's Father
- Hilda Borgström as Anna-Clara's Mother
- Linnéa Hillberg as Maid
- Margit Manstad as Young Woman
- Karin Swanström as Aunt
- Lill-Tollie Zellman as Astrid

== Bibliography ==
- Qvist, Per Olov & von Bagh, Peter. Guide to the Cinema of Sweden and Finland. Greenwood Publishing Group, 2000.
