= Halfdan Jebe =

Norwegian violinist

Halfdan Fredrik Jebe
- Born: November 3, 1868; Trondheim, Norway
- Died: December 17, 1937 (aged 69); Mexico City, Mexico
- Occupations: Violinist; conductor; composer
- Notable work: Vesle Kari Rud (opera); Dignidad Maya (opera); Symphony in A minor
- Spouse: Sofie Bernhoft

Halfdan Fredrik Jebe (3 November 1868 – 17 December 1937) was a Norwegian violinist, conductor and composer.

== Life ==
Jebe was born in Trondheim, Norway, and received his education in Oslo, Leipzig, Berlin, and Paris. Among his teachers were the violinist Joseph Joachim and the composer Jules Massenet. In Paris he became acquainted with artists like Edvard Munch, Vilhelm Krag, August Strindberg and Christian Sinding. He also befriended Frederick Delius and accompanied him to Florida in January 1897. Later he led the orchestra at the Delius Orchestral Concert under Hertz in London 30 May 1899, the first performance of Delius' orchestral music. After a year as conductor at Fahlstrøms Theater (Centralteatret) in Christiania, where he met his future wife Sofie Bernhoft, he left Europe 1901 and travelled extensively in Europe and Egypt. In 1902 and 1903 he visited India, Ceylon, China and Japan. He later travelled widely in North and South America, eventually settling in Mexico, where he lived in Mérida for the rest of his life, teaching at the Mérida Conservatory. He died in Mexico City, Mexico.

== Works ==
Jebe's best-known compositions include his two operas, Vesle Kari Rud (1904-5) and Dignidad Maya (1932-3), the overture Uxmal, and his Symphony in A minor, composed in memory of Felipe Carrillo Puerto, the Mexican revolutionary executed in 1924. He also composed other orchestral music including suites, festival music, and an orchestral paraphrase on Sobre las olas, as well as chamber music, choral music, and song. In January 1932 a concert with the Oslo Philharmonic Orchestra conducted by Olav Kielland was dedicated to Jebe's works, notably the Symphony in A minor and parts of the ballet Lol-tun.

Charles Francis Keary based his itinerant musician character Hauch (in The Journalist, 1898) on Hebe.
