= Lars Osa =

Norwegian artist (1860–1958)

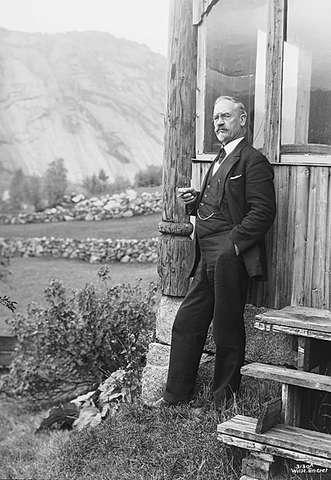
- Lars Osa in 1929
- Born: 13 August 1860; Ulvik, Norway
- Died: 9 February 1958 (aged 97); Voss, Hordaland, Norway
- Occupations: Painter; Fiddler
- Spouse: Hermine Bernhoft-Osa
- Children: Sigbjørn Bernhoft Osa

Lars Osa (13 August 1860 – 9 February 1958) was a Norwegian artist. He also worked with church decoration and restoration and was a noted fiddle player.

== Biography ==
Lars Andersen was born in the village of Ulvik in Ulvik Municipality in Søndre Bergenhus county, Norway. When Lars Osa was five years old, the family moved from the (larger) village of Ulvik into the (very small) village of Osa, located about 8 kilometres (5.0 mi) away, at the end of the Osafjord, an arm of the Hardangerfjord. He grew up in an environment characterized by a living folk tradition. He visited Knud Bergslien in Eidfjord and received his first art lessons from him. That same year he went to Christiania and was a pupil at Tegneskolen. In 1882 he was admitted as a student at the Art Academy in Copenhagen. He studied there until 1885, and continued as a student under the Danish painters Laurits Tuxen (1853–1927) and Peder Severin Krøyer until 1886. He used a travel scholarship for trips to Paris during the autumn and winter of 1897 and 1898.

Since so much of what Osa had studied underlined the continuity between medieval and folk art decorations, it was natural for him to examine Norwegian frescoes. He did research in several Norwegian medieval churches: Kinsarvik Church, Old Tingelstad Church, Tingvoll Church, and Slidre Church. Among his notable church decorations are Ulvik Church, which he decorated with rose painting in 1923, and Heddal Stave Church, where in 1908 Lars Osa painted The Resurrection. Additional works of note include Haram Church and Granvin Church.

His work is characterized by a strong commitment to the national in different cultural expressions. The most notable example of this was Faderen, which was shown during 1889 at the World Exhibition in Paris (Exposition Universelle). During the summer 1894, he traveled to Setesdal, where there were many of the old traditions still maintained in a fairly authentic setting. The next year he returned to Setesdal, and in 1896 he moved to Kristiansand. From there it was not far to Valle in Aust-Agder county, where he spent the summers.

He is represented in the National Gallery of Norway with the painting Tjenestepiken (1889). A memorial of him by the Norwegian-American sculptor Lars Fletre was unveiled in 1967 at the Ulvik National Museum. Osa wrote the memoir book Med pensel og feleboge in 1954, when he was 94 years old.

== Personal life ==
Lars Osa was married twice. In 1891 he married Hermine Bernhoft (1865–1929), an author of children's books. In 1944 he married Bertha Sivertsen (1883–1968). He was the father of folk musician Sigbjørn Bernhoft Osa (1910–1990).

== Select works ==
- Tjenestepiken (1889)
- Ola Mosafinn (1887)
- Faderen (1889)
- Ivar Aasen (1895)
- Barnebegravelse i Valle (1895)
- Et menneske (1897)
- Et bryllup i Setesdal (1903)
- Oppbyggelse i Valle (1904)
- Ein trøyt spelemann (1912)
- Barnedåp i Valle (1916)

== Other sources ==
- Mohn, Astrid (2000). Ein kyrkjekunst, bygd på gamal god grunn: En analyse av Lars Osas dekorasjoner i Ulvik kirke (in Norwegian). Bergen: University of Bergen.
