= Stina Bergman =

Swedish writer (1888–1976)

Stina Bergman (29 April 1888 – 3 July 1976) was a Swedish writer, translator and screenwriter.

Bergman was the daughter of actor August Lindberg and actress Augusta Lindberg, and sister of director Per Lindberg. She was married to author Hjalmar Bergman.

== Filmography as screenwriter ==
- Swedenhielms (1935)
- A Woman's Face (1938)
- Dollar (1938)
- Gubben kommer (1939)
- Hans Nåds testamente (1940)
