= Lydia Molander =

Finnish-Swedish stage actress and opera singer

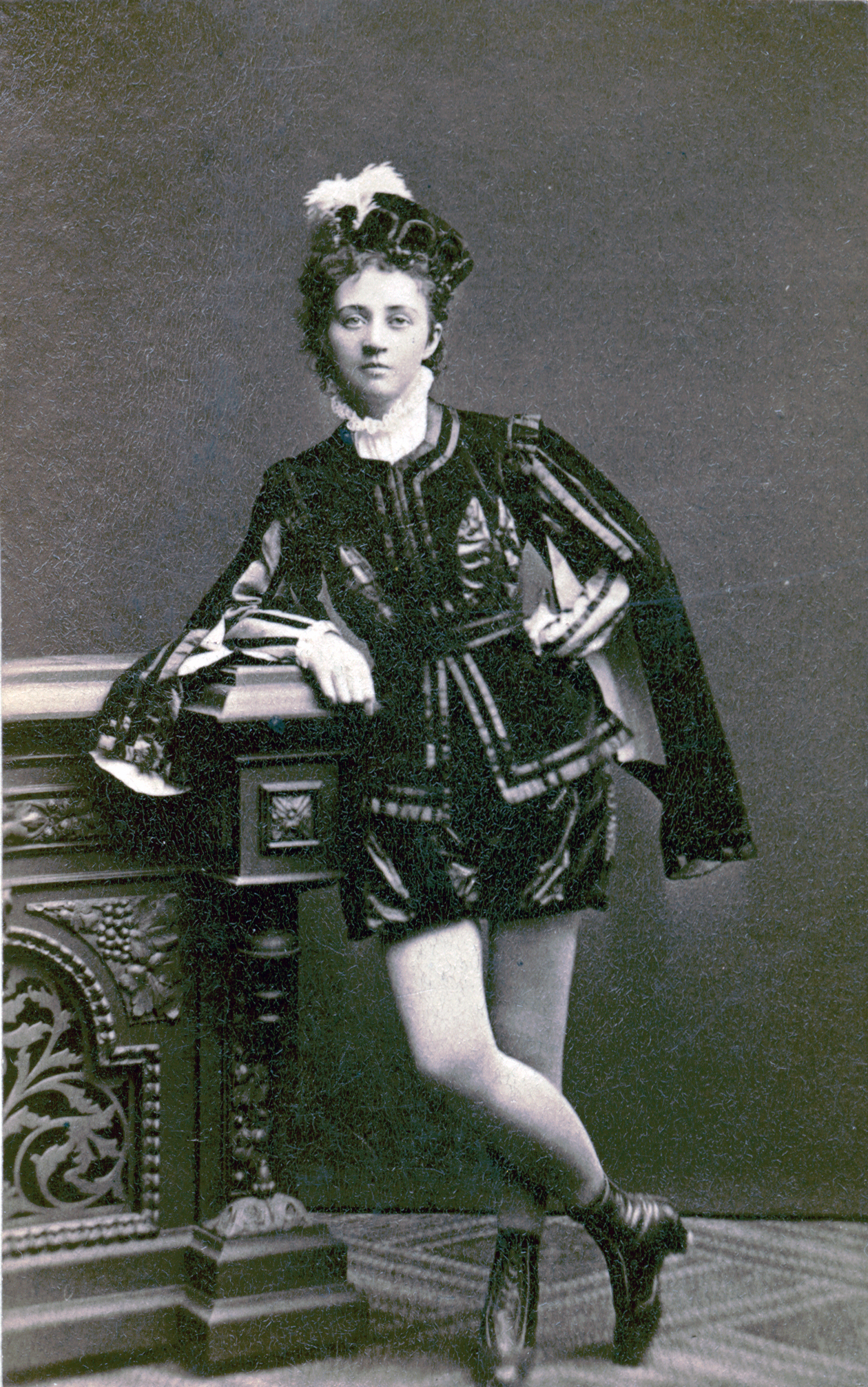
Lydia Molander

Lydia Molander (née Wessler; 1851–1929) was a Finnish-Swedish stage actress and opera singer.

Lydia Molander was trained at the Royal Swedish Opera. She was engaged at the Swedish Theatre in Helsinki in 1874-1894. She was described as a very versatile stage artist, capable both within opera and operetta as well as a dramatic actor within drama and comedy.
