= Einar Axelsson =

Swedish actor (1895–1971)

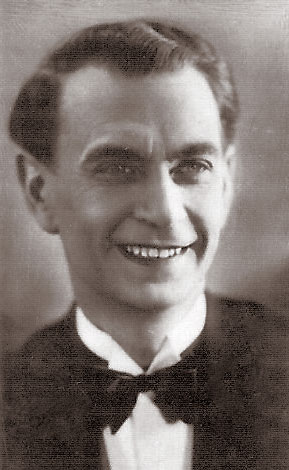
- Axelsson in 1935
- Born: 25 February 1895; Lund, Sweden
- Died: 30 October 1971 (aged 76); Stockholm, Sweden
- Occupation: Actor
- Years active: 1921–1970 (film)

Einar Axelsson (25 February 1895 – 30 October 1971) was a Swedish stage and film actor.

== Biography ==
Einar Rickard Axelsson was born at Lund in Skåne, Sweden. He was the son of actors Konstantin and Amelie Axelsson. He was the brother of journalist George Axelsson (1898–1966). After playing at the Folkteatern in Gothenburg (1913–1914), he joined the theater company of Karin Swanström which was active until the early 1920s. From 1925 to 1941, Axelsson was one of the leading names in various theater companies associated with Ernst Eklund. He died at Stocksund in Stockholm and was buried at Danderyds kyrkogård in Stockholm.

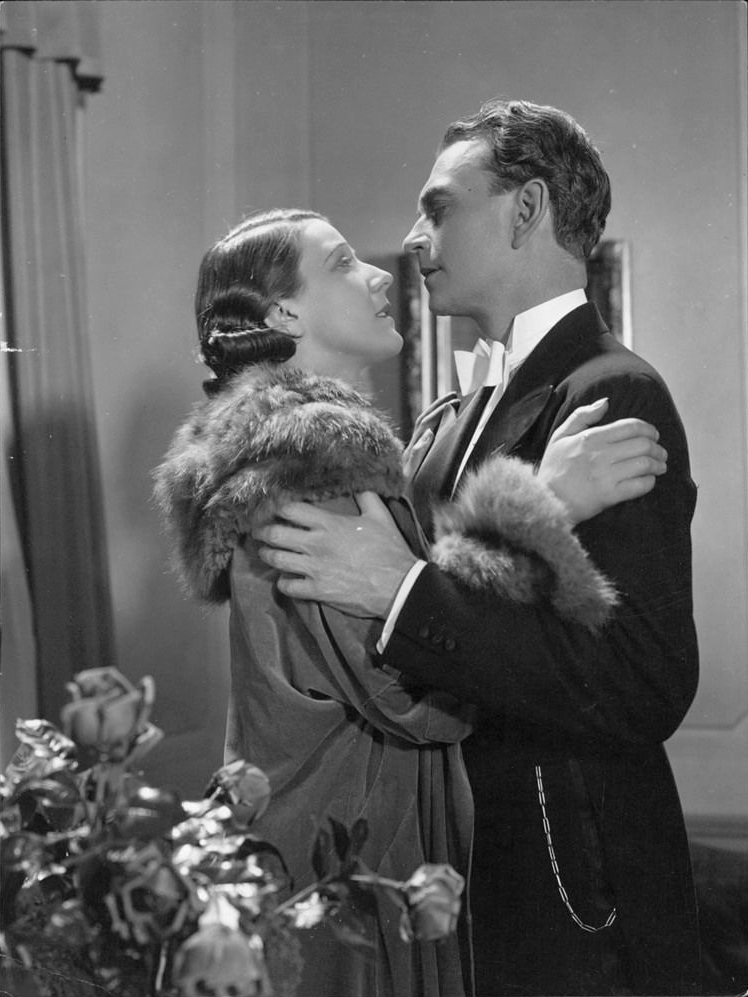
Einar Axelson with co-star Ester Roeck-Hansen in Black Roses.(1932)

== Selected filmography ==
- The Phantom Carriage (1921)
- Thomas Graal's Ward (1922)
- The Girl in Tails (1926)
- Getting Married (1926)
- The Poetry of Ådalen (1928)
- Black Roses (1932)
- The Love Express (1932)
- Marriageable Daughters (1933)
- Eva Goes Aboard (1934)
- Kanske en gentleman (1935)
- The Marriage Game (1935)
- The Ghost of Bragehus (1936)
- Happy Vestköping (1937)
- Witches' Night (1937)
- Hanna in Society (1940)
- A Crime (1940)
- Magistrarna på sommarlov (1941)
- Fransson the Terrible (1941)
- Lyckan kommer (1942)
- We House Slaves (1942)
- It Is My Music (1942)
- The Emperor of Portugallia (1944)
- Between Brothers (1946)
- Iris and the Lieutenant (1947)
- Sunshine (1948)
- Simon the Sinner (1954)
- The Girl in Tails (1956)
- A Doll's House (1956)
- The Great Amateur (1958)
- We at Väddö (1958)
- More Than a Match for the Navy (1958)
- A Goat in the Garden (1958)

== Bibliography ==
- Tommy Gustafsson. Masculinity in the Golden Age of Swedish Cinema: A Cultural Analysis of 1920s Films. McFarland, 2014.
