= Intermezzo (1936 Swedish film) =

1936 film by Gustaf Molander

- Swedish film poster
- Directed by: Gustaf Molander
- Written by: Gustaf Molander; Gösta Ekman
- Starring: Gösta Ekman; Ingrid Bergman
- Cinematography: Åke Dahlqvist
- Edited by: Oscar Rosander
- Music by: Heinz Provost; Christian Sinding; Pyotr Ilyich Tchaikovsky
- Distributed by: Scandinavian Talking Pictures
- Release dates: 16 November 1936 (Sweden); 24 December 1937 (U.S.)
- Running time: 93 minutes
- Country: Sweden
- Language: Swedish

Intermezzo is a 1936 Swedish drama film directed and co-written by Gustaf Molander about a concert violinist falling in love with his daughter's piano teacher. The cast includes Gösta Ekman and Ingrid Bergman in the leads. This film led to Bergman gaining her contract with David O. Selznick and acting in a 1939 American remake opposite Leslie Howard. It was later remade again as the 1980 film Honeysuckle Rose.

== Main cast ==
- Gösta Ekman as Professor Holger Brandt
- Inga Tidblad as Margit Brandt
- Ingrid Bergman as Anita Hoffman
- Erik Berglund as Impresario Charles Möller (credited as Bullen Berglund)
- Hugo Björne as Thomas Stenborg
- Anders Henrikson as Swedish sailor
- Hasse Ekman as Åke Brandt (credited as Hans Ekman)
- Britt Hagman as Ann-Marie Brandt
