= Ernst Rolf =

Swedish actor, singer, composer and musical revue artist

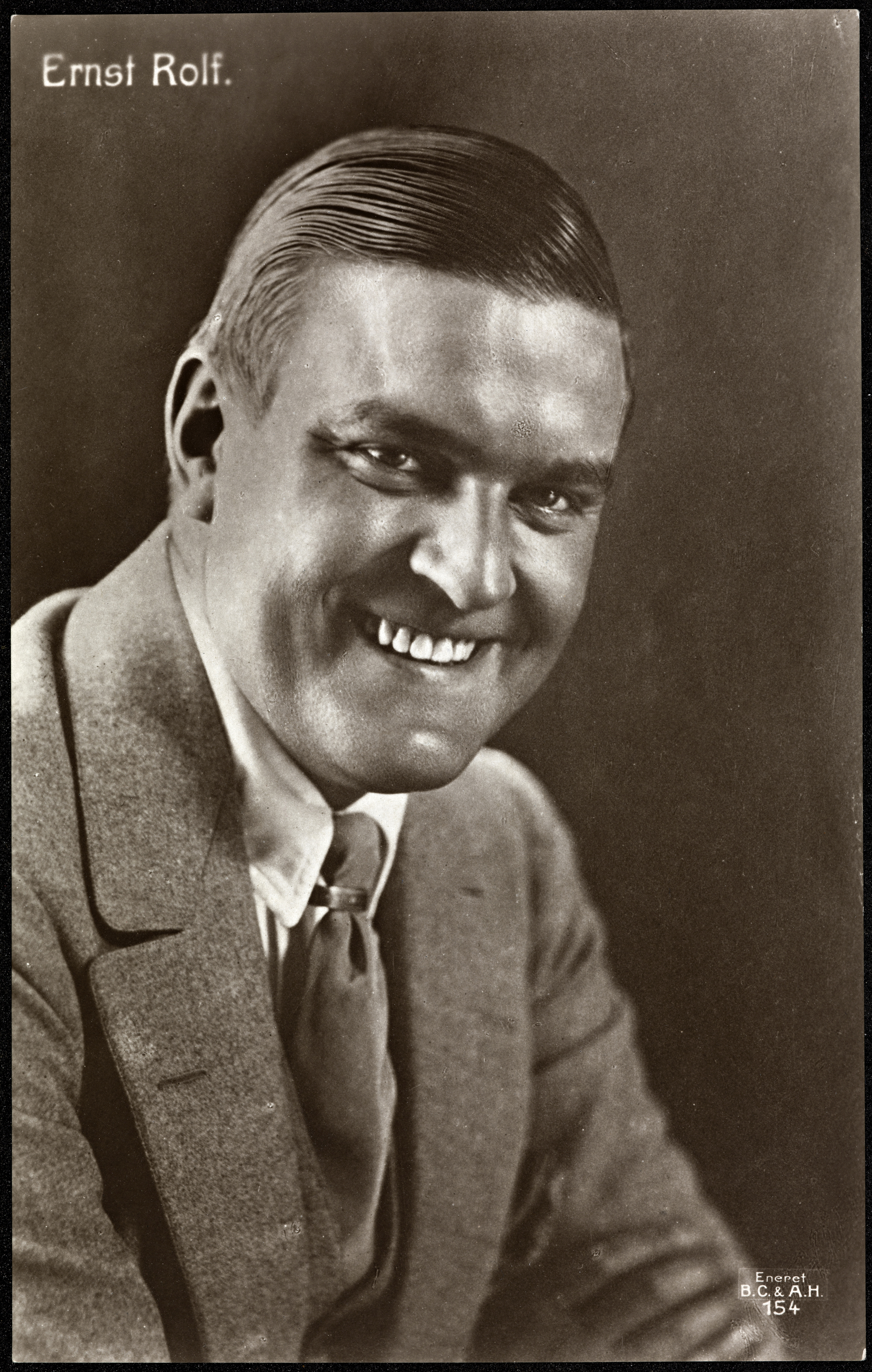
- Ernst Rolf
- Born: Ernst Ragnar Johansson; 20 January 1891; Falun, Sweden
- Died: 25 December 1932 (aged 41); Stockholm, Sweden
- Occupations: Actor, singer, musical revue artist
- Years active: 1907–1932
- Spouses: Margit Strugstad (m. 1916–1923) Gueye Rolf (m. 1924–1927) Tutta Rolf (m. 1930–1932)
- Children: Four (including Tom Rolf)

Ernst Ragnar Johansson (20 January 1891 – 25 December 1932), professionally known as Ernst Rolf was a Swedish actor, singer and composer and musical revue artist. Rolf was born in Falun in the Swedish province of Dalarna, where his father was a tailor and member of the temperance movement. His musical talent was evident from the start when even as a young child he performed at IOGT meetings. He would sing while his older brother Birger played the piano.

In 1906 Rolf found work at the Åhlén & Holm mail order company in Insjön, Dalarna. He made his stage debut in a performance of The Wizard of Oz, playing Dorothy in an all-male cast. In 1907 he began touring the country as a singer and comedian, quickly becoming one of Sweden's most famous and successful entertainers.

During the 1920s Rolf was known for producing revues that were acclaimed for their dazzling sets, first class actors and stirring music. He was also a lyricist and composer, who wrote, for instance, the words to Finska Valsen (The Finnish Waltz) and the music for Från Frisco Till Cap (From Frisco to the Cape). He recorded his first song in 1910 and throughout his career made over eight hundred recordings. He acted in a number of films as well.

== Personal life ==
He was married three times. In 1930 his third wife, actress Tutta Rolf, appeared with him in a Scandinavian version of Paramount on Parade. The following year they had a son, Tom Rolf, who became an Academy Award-winning film editor. In spite of his success, personal and financial problems became overwhelming, and in 1932, on Christmas Eve, Rolf jumped in the frigid lake, near his vacation home on Lidingö, having consumed a large amount of barbiturates mixed with cognac a few moments prior. He survived the incident, but contracted pneumonia, which proved fatal. He was buried at Norra begravningsplatsen in Stockholm.

Rolf's son from his first marriage, Sven Erik Rolf, joined the Norwegian Fascist party Nasjonal Samling and fought as a volunteer in the Waffen-SS's Norwegian Legion on the Eastern Front during World War II.
