= Ester Roeck-Hansen =

Swedish actress (1897–1987)

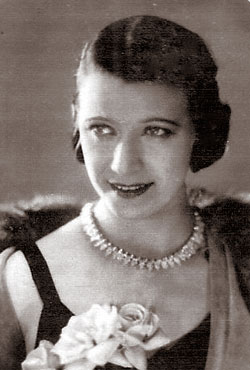
- Roeck-Hansen in 1935
- Born: Ester Linnéa Andersson; 12 August 1897; Uddevalla, Sweden-Norway
- Died: 14 June 1987 (aged 89); Stockholm, Sweden
- Occupation: Actress
- Years active: 1926–1956 (film)
- Spouse(s): Harry Roeck-Hansen (m. 1919; div. 1946)

Ester Roeck-Hansen (born Ester Linnéa Andersson; 1897–1987) was a Swedish stage and film actress. She was married to the actor Harry Roeck-Hansen.

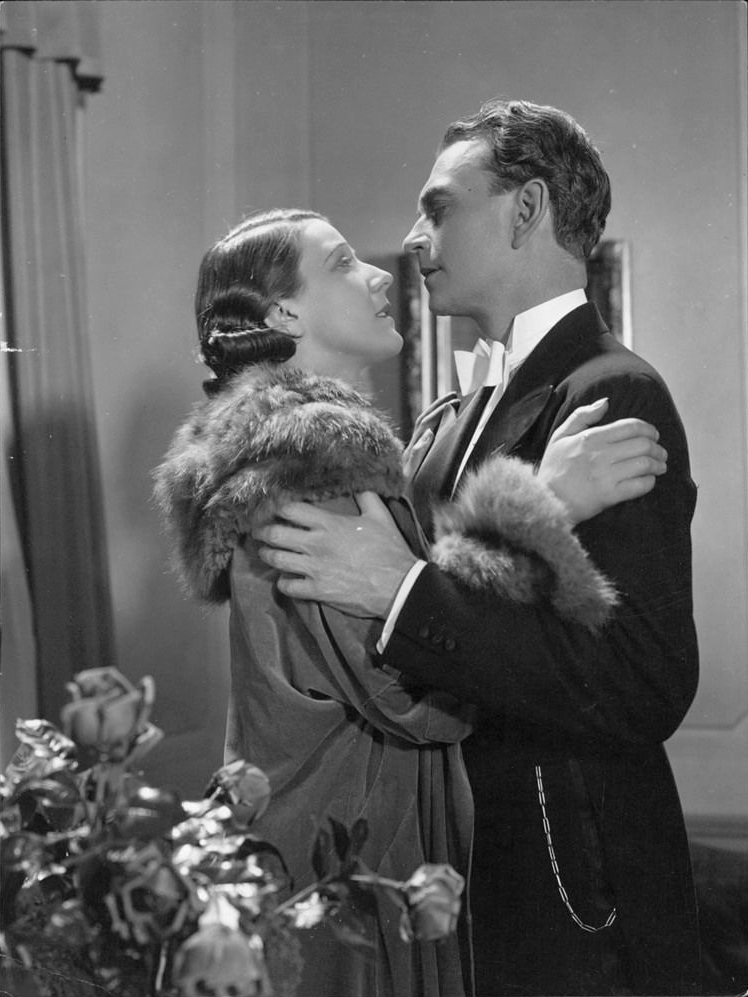
Esther Roeck-Hansen with co-star Einar Axelsson in Black Roses.(1932)

== Selected filmography ==
- The Million Dollars (1926)
- Hotel Paradis (1931)
- Black Roses (1932)
- Kungliga patrasket (1945)
- The Sixth Commandment (1947)
- Love Wins Out (1949)
- The Nuthouse (1951)
- For the Sake of My Intemperate Youth (1952)
- The Girl in Tails (1956)

== Bibliography ==
- Bo Grandien. Stockholm i lågor. Bonnier, 1968.
