= Under False Flag (1935 film) =

1935 film

- Directed by: Gustaf Molander
- Written by: Sölve Cederstrand; Gösta Stevens; Adorján Bónyi (play A milliomos); Hans H. Zerlett (A Man with Heart, 1932)
- Starring: Ernst Eklund; Tutta Rolf; Allan Bohlin
- Cinematography: Elner Åkesson
- Music by: Jules Sylvain
- Production company: Svensk Filmindustri
- Distributed by: Svensk Filmindustri
- Release date: 13 August 1935
- Running time: 76 minutes
- Country: Sweden
- Language: Swedish

Under False Flag (Swedish: Under falsk flagg) is a 1935 Swedish comedy film directed by Gustaf Molander and starring Ernst Eklund, Tutta Rolf and Allan Bohlin. It was shot at the Råsunda Studios in Stockholm and on location around the city. The film's sets were designed by the art director Arne Åkermark. It was a remake of the 1932 German film A Man with Heart.

== Synopsis ==
The bank employee Bertil Lagergren falls in love with the attractive Margot Hammar without realising that she is the daughter of his boss.

== Cast ==
- Ernst Eklund as Karl Hammar
- Tutta Rolf as Margot Hammar / Margot Hammarström
- Allan Bohlin as Bertil Lagergren
- Nils Ericson as Harry Jonsson
- Karin Kavli as Britta Lundgren
- Anna Lindahl as Maud Billing
- Carin Swensson as Gunvor Berg
- Erik 'Bullen' Berglund as Brink
- Richard Lund as Staff manager
- Constance Gibson as Mrs. Johansson
- Eric Gustafson as Lundblom
- Wiktor Andersson as Andersson
- Bellan Roos as Maid
- Sonja Claesson as Cook
- Erik Rosén as Count Gylling
- Tord Bernheim as Man on the bus
- Rolf Botvid as Young man at the exhibition
- Wiola Brunius as Guest at Hammar's party
- Ernst Brunman as Board member
- Alice Carlsson as Guest at Hammar's party
- Eivor Engelbrektsson as Banana girl
- Karin Granberg as Guest at Hammar's party
- Gösta Grip as Guest at Hammar's party
- Wilhelm Haqvinius as Board member
- Anna-Lisa Hydén as Guest at Hammar's party
- Sven Jerring as Radio reporter (voice)
- Jullan Jonsson as Lina, Hammar's housemaid
- Elvin Liberg as Larsson, Hammar's driver
- Helge Mauritz as Board secretary
- Einar Molin as Guest at Hammar's party
- Yngve Nyqvist as Board member
- Holger Sjöberg as Big man at the exhibition
- Charles White as Black man at the exhibition

== See also ==
- A Man with Heart (1932)

== Bibliography ==
- Per Olov Qvist & Peter von Bagh. Guide to the Cinema of Sweden and Finland. Greenwood Publishing Group, 2000.
