= Harry Roeck-Hansen =

Swedish actor

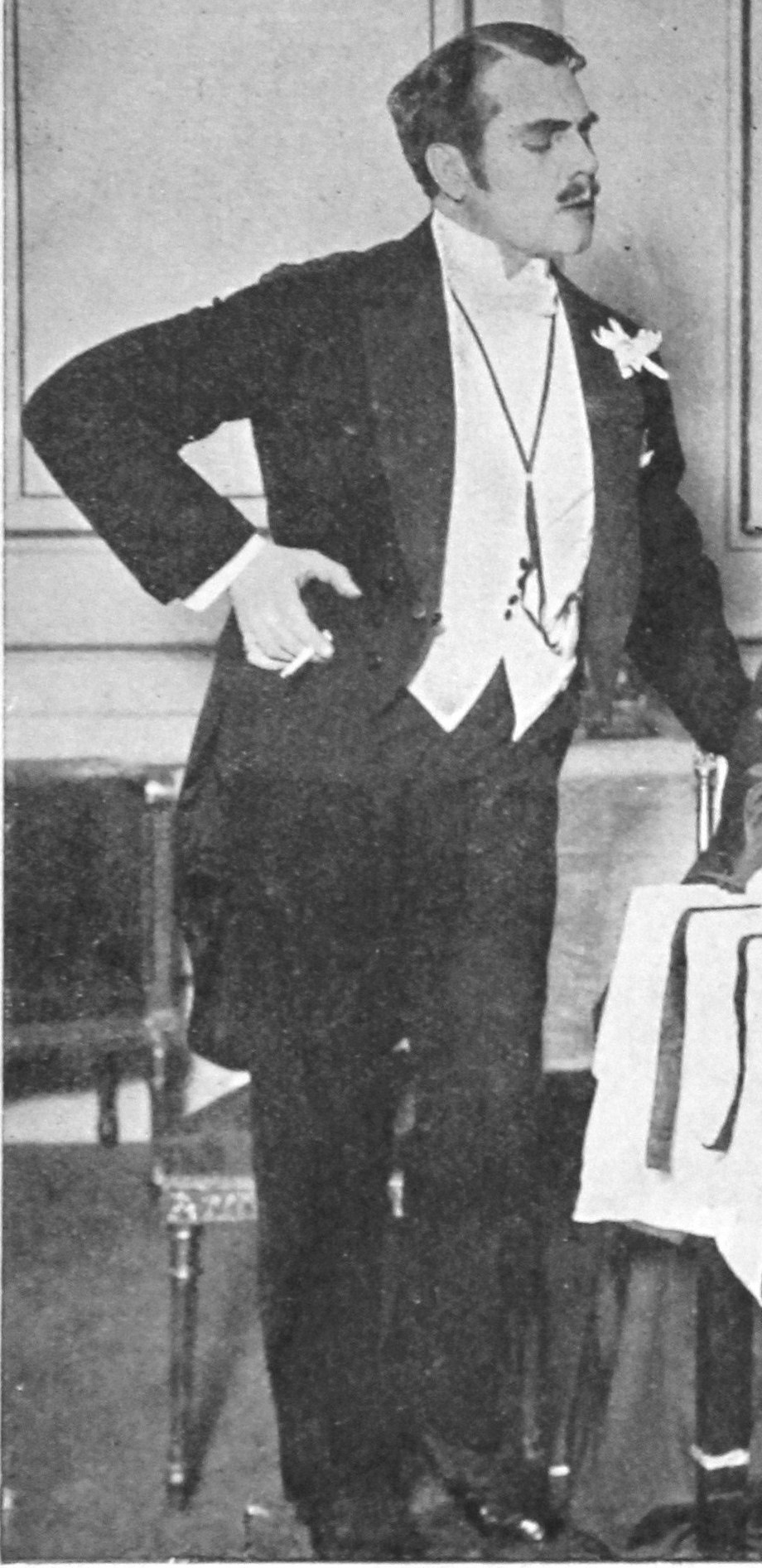
- Roeck-Hansen in 1917
- Born: Harry Hansen; 13 June 1891; Stockholm, Sweden
- Died: 8 August 1959 (aged 68); Sweden
- Occupation: Actor
- Years active: 1917–1941 (film)
- Spouses: Ester Roeck-Hansen (m. 1919; div. 1946) Ruth Stevens (m. 1946)

Harry Roeck-Hansen (né Hansen; 1891–1959) was a Swedish stage and film actor. He was married to the actresses Ester Roeck-Hansen and Ruth Stevens.

== Selected filmography ==
- Thomas Graal's Ward (1922)
- The Counts at Svansta (1924)
- Charles XII (1925)
- Hotel Paradis (1931)
- What Do Men Know? (1933)
- The Marriage Game (1935)
- The Wedding Trip (1936)
- Art for Art's Sake (1938)
- Hanna in Society (1940)
- The Bjorck Family (1940)
- In Paradise (1941)

== Bibliography ==
- Klossner, Michael. The Europe of 1500-1815 on Film and Television: A Worldwide Filmography of Over 2550 Works, 1895 Through 2000. McFarland & Company, 2002.
