= Augusta Lindberg =

Swedish actress

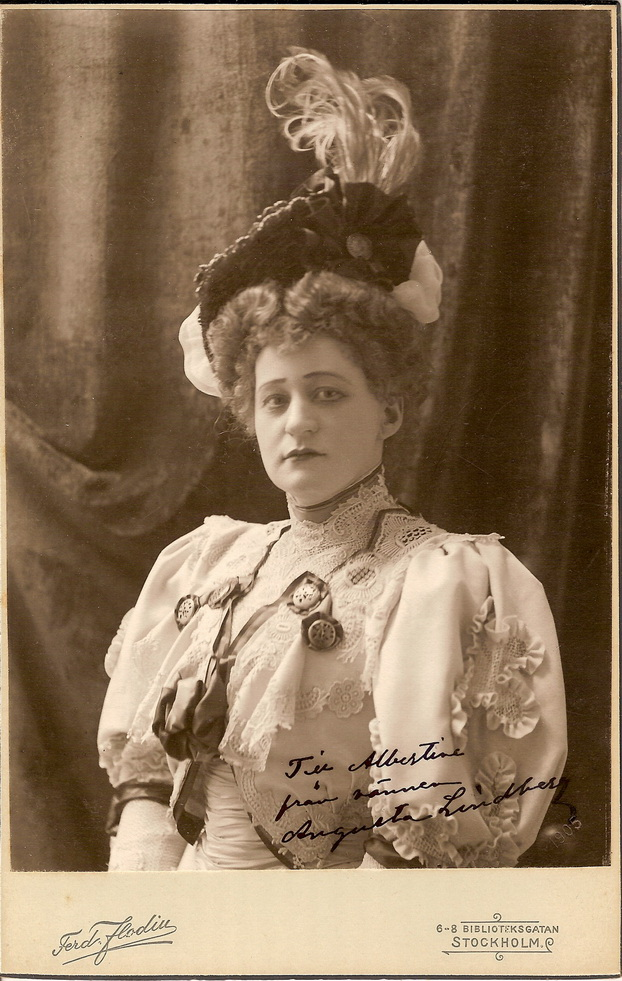
- Lindberg in 1906.
- Born: Augusta Wilhelmina Blomstedt; 17 March 1866; Stockholm, Sweden
- Died: 3 December 1943 (aged 77)
- Occupation: Actress

Augusta Lindberg (née Blomstedt; 17 March 1866 – 3 December 1943) was a Swedish stage actress. Lindberg also appeared in silent films, such as the 1925 historical epic Charles XII. She was married to the actor August Lindberg and was the mother of the writer Stina Bergman and the director Per Lindberg.

== Filmography ==
- His Lordship's Last Will (1919)
- Charles XII (1925)

== Bibliography ==
- Kwiatkowski, Aleksander. Swedish Film Classics. Courier Dover Publications, 2013.
