= Gösta Stevens =

Swedish screenwriter and film director

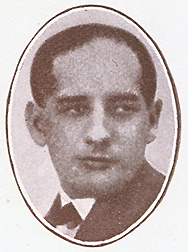
- Born: 1 February 1897; Bergen, Norway
- Died: 24 September 1964 (aged 67); Stockholm, Swedish
- Other name: Gösta Nilsson
- Occupations: film director, screenwriter
- Years active: 1932–1959

Gösta Stevens (1 February 1897 – 24 September 1964) was a Swedish screenwriter and film director.

== Biography ==
Gösta Stevens began his career as a journalist, but soon began writing couplets for local revues. Stevens offered Karl-Ewert Christenson his services before a summer revue at Kristallsalongen in 1924. To this he wrote the couplet Kom som du ä. Soon, Ernst Rolf took notice of the young writer and Steven wrote many numbers for him. He was also the author of many of Björn Hodell's and Kar de Mumma's revues.

Stevens also wrote other lyrics. Among other things, he wrote the lyrics to Sommarnatt (with music by Mogens Schrader), often sung by Jussi Björling. He also wrote the lyrics to I have become much better now in the old days, sung by Zarah Leander.

Stevens was one of Swedish film's most prolific screenwriters – between 1930 and 1954 he wrote almost 50 scripts.

He was married to actress Ruth Stevens 1928–1932. He later married Sonja Stevens, born 21 December 1918. Stevens is buried at Skogskyrkogården in Stockholm.

== Selected filmography ==
Screenwriter

- Love and Deficit (1932)
- Modern Wives (1932)
- Dear Relatives (1933)
- House Slaves (1933)
- What Do Men Know? (1933)
- Under False Flag (1935)
- The Family Secret (1936)
- Intermezzo (1936)
- The Wedding Trip (1936)
- Sara Learns Manners (1937)
- Emilie Högquist (1939)
- Variety Is the Spice of Life (1939)
- Only One Night (1939)
- One, But a Lion! (1940)
- The Three of Us (1940)
- Bright Prospects (1941)
- The Fight Continues (1941)
- There's a Fire Burning (1943)
- Sonja (1943)
- The Sixth Shot (1943)
- The Invisible Wall (1944)
- I Love You Karlsson (1947)
- Sven Tusan (1949)
- Love Wins Out (1949)
- Fiancée for Hire (1950)
- The Quartet That Split Up (1950)
- Beef and the Banana (1951)
- One Fiancée at a Time (1952)
- Say It with Flowers (1952)
- Blondie, Beef and the Banana (1952)
- The Red Horses (1954)
- The Unicorn (1955)
- Jazzgossen (1958)
- Heaven and Pancake (1959)
- Honeysuckle Rose (1980, original story)

Director

- Bastard (1940)
- I Am with You (1948)
- Sven Tusan (1949)
- Number 17 (1949)

== Bibliography ==
- Chandler, Charlotte. Ingrid: Ingrid Bergman, a Personal Biography. Simon and Schuster, 2007.
- Kwiatkowski, Aleksander. Swedish Film Classics: A Pictorial Survey of 25 Films from 1913 to 1957. Courier Dover Publications, 1983.
- Soila, Tytti. The Cinema Of Scandinavia. Wallflower Press, 2005.
- Wright, Rochelle. The Visible Wall: Jews and Other Ethnic Outsiders in Swedish Film. SIU Press, 1998.
