= Per Lindberg =

Swedish director and theatre manager (1890–1944)

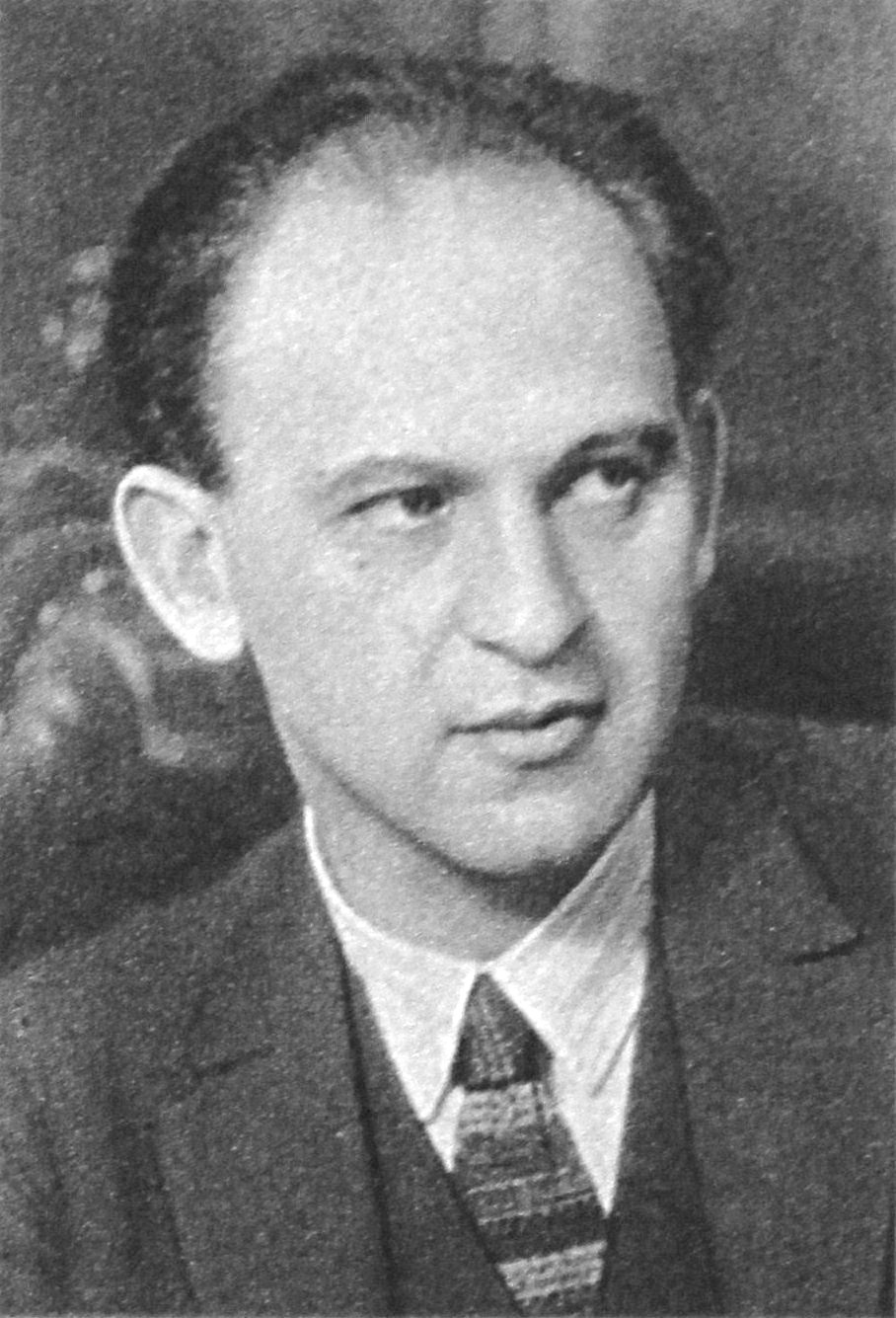
- Born: 5 March 1890; Adolf Fredriks parish
- Died: 7 February 1944 (aged 53); Hedvig Eleonora parish
- Resting place: Norra begravningsplatsen
- Occupation: Playwright, writer
- Spouse(s): Signe Blaustein
- Parent(s): August Lindberg; Augusta Lindberg

Per Lindberg (5 March 1890 – 7 February 1944) was a Swedish theatre and film director.

== Biography ==
Lindberg was born in Stockholm as the son of the actress Augusta Lindberg and the actor, theater director and manager August Lindberg. His sister was the writer Stina Bergman. Already as a schoolboy, Lindberg accompanied his father on a theater trip to Berlin. In 1909, he became a student at Stockholm University. During 1911-1912, Lindberg interrupted his studies to accompany his father on his tour through North America. Lindberg made his stage debut when in Chicago on January 21, 1912. In 1918, Lindberg became the first director at Lorensbergsteatern in Gothenburg and from 1919–23, he was theater director. Lindberg was the first director at the Comedy Theatre (Komediteatern) and Concert Theater (Konserthusteatern) in Stockholm 1925-1927, at the Royal Dramatic Theatre 1927–1928, and was then theater director at Sveriges Radiotjänst 1929–1931.

As a film director, Lindberg was heavily influenced by Austrian director Max Reinhardt and German Expressionism of the 1920s. He is best known for directing June Nights (1940) with Ingrid Bergman.

== Selected filmography ==
- Anna-Clara and Her Brothers (1923)
- June Night (1940)
- The Talk of the Town (1941)
- In Paradise (1941)
