= Gustaf Molander =

Swedish film director (1888–1973)

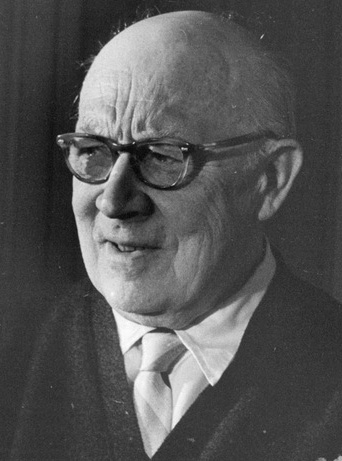
- Gustaf Molander, 1964.
- Born: Gustaf Harald August Molander; 18 November 1888; Helsinki, Finland
- Died: 19 June 1973 (aged 84); Stockholm, Sweden
- Occupations: Director, actor, screenwriter
- Years active: 1948–2004
- Spouses: Karin Molander (m. 1910–1918) Elsa Fahlberg (m. 1919)
- Children: Harald Molander; Jan Molander
- Parent(s): Harald Molander; Lydia Molander
- Relatives: Olof Molander (brother)

Gustaf Harald August Molander (18 November 1888 – 19 June 1973) was a Swedish actor and film director. His parents were director Harald Molander, Sr. (1858–1900) and singer and actress Lydia Molander, née Wessler, and his brother was the director Olof Molander (1892–1966). He was the father of director and producer Harald Molander from his first marriage, from 1910-1918, with actress Karin Molander and father to actor Jan Molander from his second marriage to Elsa Fahlberg (1892–1977).

Gustaf Molander was born in Helsingfors (Helsinki) in the Grand Duchy of Finland (in the Russian Empire), where his father was working at the Swedish Theatre. He studied in the school of the Royal Dramatic Theatre in Stockholm 1907–1909, acted at the Swedish Theatre in Helsingfors 1909–1913, and then at the Royal Dramatic Theatre from 1913 to 1926. The last years there he headed the school; his students included Greta Garbo.

Molander wrote several screenplays for Victor Sjöström and Mauritz Stiller, and was helped by the latter to get employment as a director for Svensk Filmindustri, where he worked 1923–1956. All in all, he directed 62 films. He often worked with Gösta Ekman, and his films include Intermezzo (1936), which became Ingrid Bergman's breakthrough and paved her way to America, where she starred in the 1939 Hollywood remake of the film.

In 1943 he directed Ordet, the first film version of the play of the same name written by the Protestant pastor Kaj Munk, not to be confused with the second and more famous version of the film brought to the big screen by Carl Theodor Dreyer. The Danish master's film was shot twelve years later and won the prestigious Golden Lion at the Venice International Film Festival.

In 1948 Molander made what should have been his last film, Eva, but almost twenty years later, in 1967, he agreed to participate as a director of an episode in the collective film Stimulantia only to return to work with Ingrid Bergman 30 years later.

== Selected filmography ==
=== Director ===
- Thomas Graal's Ward (1922)
- Ingmar's Inheritance (1925)
- To the Orient (1926)
- She Is the Only One (1926)
- His English Wife (1927)
- Sealed Lips (1927)
- Sin (1928)
- Parisiennes (1928)
- The Triumph of the Heart (1929)
- Frida's Songs (1930)
- Charlotte Löwensköld (1930)
- Black Roses (1932)
- Love and Deficit (1932)
- Servant's Entrance (1932)
- Dear Relatives (1933)
- Under False Flag (1935)
- Swedenhielms (1935)
- The Wedding Trip (1936)
- Intermezzo (1936)
- På Solsidan (1936)
- The Family Secret (1936)
- Sara Learns Manners (1937)
- Dollar (1938)
- A Woman's Face (1938)
- Emilie Högquist (1939)
- Variety Is the Spice of Life (1939)
- Only One Night (1939)
- One, But a Lion! (1940)
- Bright Prospects (1941)
- The Fight Continues (1941)
- Tonight or Never (1941)
- Ride Tonight! (1942)
- There's a Fire Burning (1943)
- Ordet (1943)
- The Emperor of Portugallia (1944)
- The Invisible Wall (1944)
- The Gallows Man (1945)
- Affairs of a Model (1946)
- Woman Without a Face (1947)
- Eva (1948)
- Life Starts Now (1948)
- Love Wins Out (1949)
- The Quartet That Split Up (1950)
- Fiancée for Hire (1950)
- Defiance (1952)
- Love (1952)
- The Glass Mountain (1953)
- Sir Arne's Treasure (1954)
- The Unicorn (1955)
- The Song of the Scarlet Flower (1956)
- Stimulantia (1967)
