= Edith Øberg =

Norwegian novelist

Edith Justine Øberg (5 October 1895 – 21 September 1968) was a Norwegian novelist.

== Biography ==
She was born in Lysekil, Sweden, and grew up in Kristiania, Norway. She was married to writer Hans Christian Lyche. She studied languages and music, and made her debut as a singer in 1915.

Øberg made her literary debut in 1916 with the novel Pr. korrespondance. Her first major recognition came with her third novel: Boblen (1921). She published several popular novels under the pseudonym "Lita", including Med skjell på halen from 1929, and Min knapphullsblomst from 1931. Her novels Mann i mørke from 1939, followed by Innvielse (1940) and Den hvite poppelen (1945) are regarded among her more serious works, which earned her artistic recognition.
