= Emma Meissner =

Swedish soprano and actress

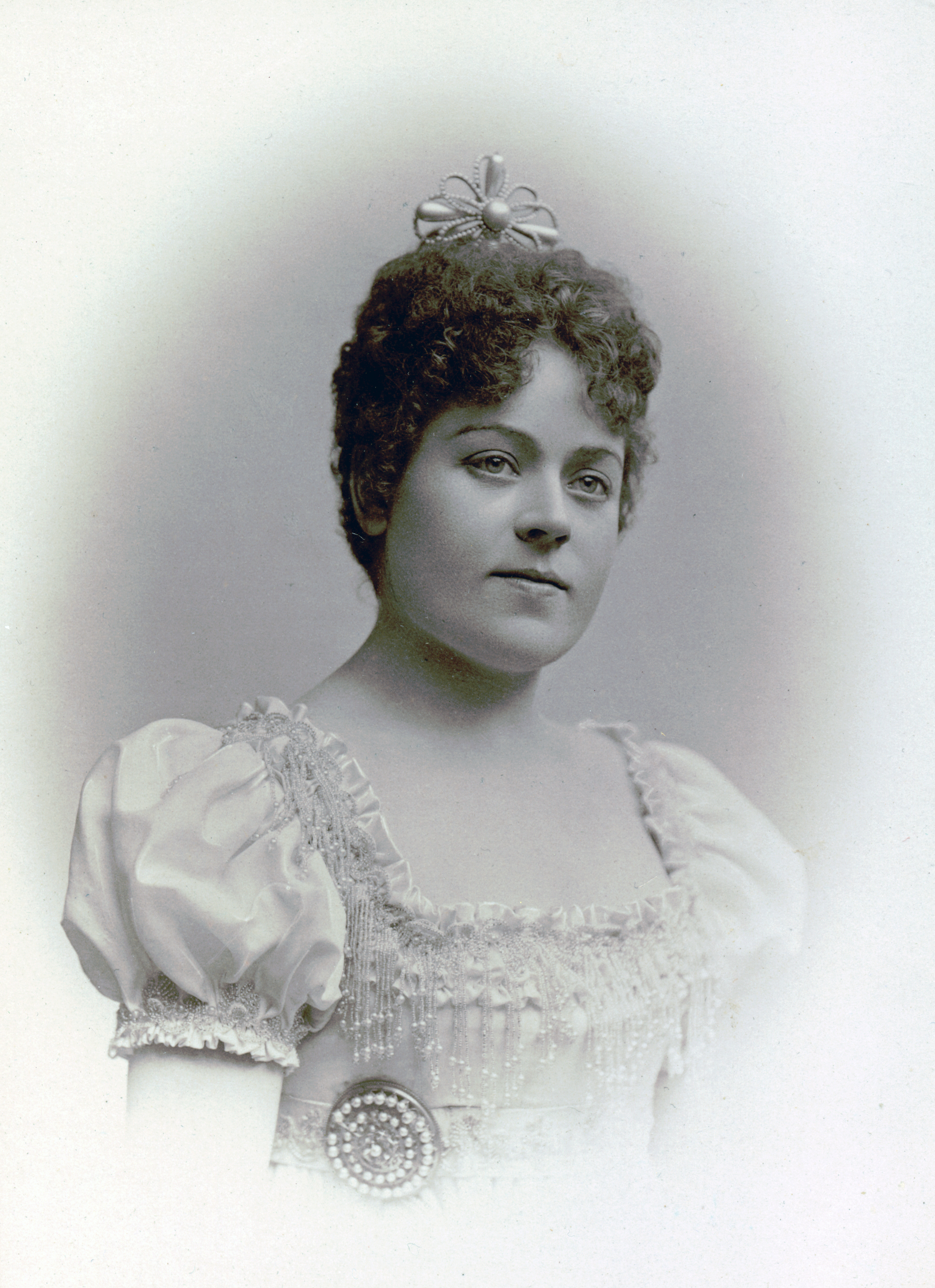
Emma Meissner.

Emma Olivia Meissner (née Ekström; 30 October 1866 – 20 November 1942) was a Swedish soprano and actress.

== Biography ==
Emma Olivia Ekström was born in Karlstad to Johan Fredrik Ekström and Anna Brita Pettersson. She worked in the choir at Mindre teatern in Stockholm 1881–1883. Her first role was as a character in the opera Sjökadetten. She was a student at the conservatory in Stockholm 1884–1885, and then studied for Fritz Arlberg (1830–1896) and Signe Hebbe (1837–1925) from 1885 to 1886. She then worked at Södra Teatern in Stockholm 1888–1889.

She got her big breakthrough at Vasateatern in Stockholm during 1890 as Yum Yum in The Mikado.

== Personal life ==
She was married from 1899 to opera conductor Hjalmar Meissner (1865–1940). He was employed by theatre director Albert Ranft (1858–1938) and was the second conductor at his theaters until 1925, with the exception of a period 1908–1910 at the Royal Swedish Opera and 1914 at the Gothenburg Symphony Orchestra.

Meissner died in Stockholm.
