= Rules of the Eurovision Song Contest =

A detailed set of rules and obligations, which all participating broadcasters and participants in the annual Eurovision Song Contest (French: Concours Eurovision de la chanson) must uphold, is produced annually ahead of each edition of the international song contest. These rules are drafted by the contest organisers, the European Broadcasting Union (EBU), and approved by the contest's reference group. They typically outline which songs may be deemed eligible for entry, the format of the contest, the voting system employed to select a contest winner and how the results of this vote are presented to the televised audience, the overall values of the contest, and distribution and broadcasting rights through television, radio and streaming services.

Since the contest's inaugural edition in 1956, the rules upon which the event has been organised and contested have changed over time.

== General format ==
The Eurovision Song Contest is an international song competition held among broadcasting networks that are members of the European Broadcasting Union (EBU). Each participating broadcaster submits an original song representing their respective country which is performed on live television and radio and transmitted to all of them via the EBU's Eurovision and Euroradio networks, hosted by one of the participating broadcasters in an auditorium in a selected host city. Following all entries each participating country casts votes for their favourite performances from the other countries, and the song which has received the most points at the end of the programme is declared the winner.

Since 2008, each contest consists of three live television shows held over one week in May. Two semi-finals are held on the Tuesday and Thursday of "Eurovision week", followed by a final on the Saturday. All competing broadcasters compete in one of the two semi-finals, with the exception of that year's host broadcaster (or the defending champion if another broadcaster hosts due to unforeseen circumstances) and the "Big Five" —the broadcasters from France, Germany, Italy, Spain, and the United Kingdom— who receive an automatic berth in the final as the contest's biggest financial contributors. All remaining competing broadcasters are split randomly across the two semi-finals, and the 10-highest scoring entries in each semi-final qualify for the final; 26 entries in total therefore compete in the final each year unless the host broadcaster is also part of the "Big Five", in which case 25 entries would compete in the final.

The votes each country provides to determine the overall winner consists of two parts: television viewers and radio listeners in each country can vote for their favourite song through telephone and SMS voting or by voting through the official Eurovision app, with all votes tallied to create a public "top 10" for that country; a selected jury of five music professionals is also appointed by each country's participating broadcaster, who rank all entries in the shows to determine their "top 10" songs. Each country then provides two sets of points representing the views of the public and jury, with each set containing the points 1-8, 10, and 12, with the highest ranked song receiving 12 points. The semi-final qualifiers are solely determined by the public vote.

The contest is a non-profit event, with financing for each year's event typically raised through a mandatory participation fee from each participating broadcaster, which varies for each country depending on its size and viewership, as well as contributions from the host broadcaster and the host city, and commercial revenues from any contest sponsorships, ticket sales for the live shows, televoting revenues and merchandise.

Eligibility to participate in the contest is limited to full members of the EBU, which consist of member broadcasters from states which fall within the European Broadcasting Area, or are member or observer states of the Council of Europe. Associate member broadcasters may also be allowed to compete in the contest, should they receive approval from the contest's reference group.

== Organisation ==
Each edition of the contest is organised by the EBU together with a host broadcaster, and is overseen by the reference group on behalf of all participating broadcasters, who are each represented by a nominated head of delegation. The head of delegation for each participating broadcaster is responsible for leading their country's delegation at the event, and is their contact person with the EBU. A delegation will typically include a head of press, the main performers, the songwriters and composers, the backing performers, and the artist's entourage, and can range from twenty to fifty people depending on the country. The heads of delegation will typically meet in March before the contest is held, to receive detailed information about the shows, the venue, stage design, lighting, and sound to best prepare their entry for the contest, as well as details on the event organisation, such as transportation and accommodation during the event.

=== Scrutineers and executive supervisors ===
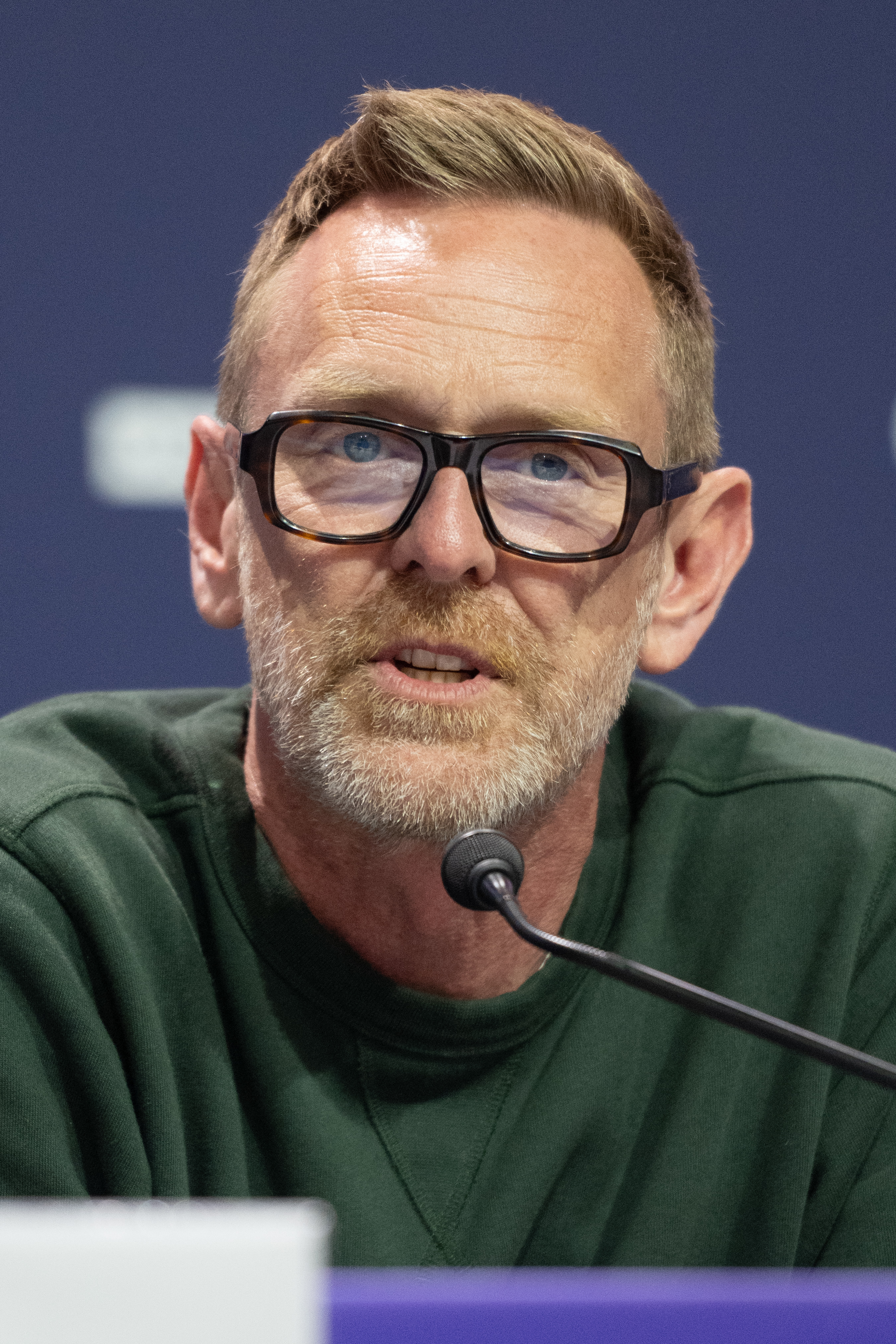
Martin Green, the contest's director since 2025

The contest's voting procedure is presided over by a scrutineer nominated by the EBU, who is responsible for ensuring that all points are allocated correctly and in turn. This role has been a consistent feature of the contest since its first edition, and evolved into the role of the executive supervisor, who is also responsible for overseeing the organisation of the contest on behalf of the EBU, enforcing the rules and monitoring the television production during the live shows. Since 2011, an event and security manager (until 2023 known as event supervisor) also oversees and coordinates other matters related to the event on behalf of the EBU.

A restructure ahead of the 2025 contest saw the addition of two new roles: the ESC director and commercial director, respectively filled by Martin Green and Jurian van der Meer, with the ESC director overseeing the work of the executive supervisor and commercial director. The executive supervisor role was abolished ahead of the 2026 contest and replaced with the executive producer role, with Gert Kark appointed as the first holder of the post.

The table below outlines the holders of the posts of executive supervisor and event supervisor in the contest's history:

Executive supervisors
Name	Contest(s)	Total
Rolf Liebermann	1956–1957	2
Unknown	1958–1962	5
Miroslav Vilček	1963–1965	3
Clifford Brown	1966–1977	12
Frank Naef	1978–1992	15
Christian Clausen	1993–1995	3
Christine Marchal-Ortiz	1996; 1998–2002	6
Marie-Claire Vionnet	1997	1
Sarah Yuen	2003	1
Svante Stockselius	2004–2010	7
Jon Ola Sand	2011–2020	9 (1 cancelled)
Martin Österdahl	2021–2025	5

Event and security managers
Name	Contest(s)	Total
Sietse Bakker	2011–2016	5
Nadja Burkhardt	2016–2022	6 (1 cancelled)
Andreas Schmitz-Mensger	2023–present	3

=== Reference group ===
The reference group is the contest's executive committee and works on behalf of all participating broadcasters in the contest. The group of broadcast executives and producers from various EBU member organisations meets four to five times a year, and its role is to approve the development and format of the contest, secure financing, control the contest's branding, raise public awareness, and to oversee the yearly preparations of the contest with the host broadcaster.

The composition of the group consists of a chairperson, three elected members from among the heads of delegations, the executive producer(s) of the upcoming contest as well as of the two previous contests, up to another two invited members with relevant competence and experience, and the executive producer on behalf of the EBU, which is separate from the executive producer(s) appointed by the host broadcaster. Previously, the chairperson typically comes from a EBU member broadcaster which does not participate in the contest, though this has been abolished; the chairperson is currently elected from among all member broadcasters' high-ranking personnel, with the chosen candidate going on to serve a two-year term.

As of September 2025, the current membership of the reference group is as follows:

- Ana María Bordas (chairperson; RTVE)
- Gert Kark (EBU executive producer)
- Michael Krön (ORF) (Note: Executive producer of the 2026 contest)
- Moritz Stadler (SRG SSR) (Note: Co-executive producer of the 2025 contest)
- Ebba Adielsson (SVT) (Note: Co-executive producer of the 2024 contest)
- Carla Bugalho (RTP) (Note: Elected member)
- Molly Plank (DR)
- Claudia van der Pas (AVROTROS)
- Tomislav Štengl (HRT)
- David Tserunyan (AMPTV)

== Song and artist eligibility ==
The rules of the contest set out which songs may be eligible to compete. As the contest is for new compositions, and to prevent any one competing entry from having an advantage compared to the other entries, the contest organisers typically set a restriction on when a song may be released commercially for it to be considered eligible. Rules in recent years have typically seen this date set as the first day of September of the year before the contest is to be held, however this date has varied, and in the contest's history this has been as late as a few weeks before the contest is held. Previously, songs were not allowed to be released commercially in any other country than that which it represented until after the final, however this criterion is no longer in place, and with the advancement in technology and the growth of Internet streaming, songs are regularly published online and released globally, and are now promoted via the Eurovision official website and social media platforms ahead of the contest.

No restrictions regarding the song duration were originally enacted when the contest was first founded, however following heavy protests over the 1957 Italian entry, which lasted for 5:09 minutes, a new rule was implemented, requiring each competing song to have a maximum duration of three minutes; a rule that still applies.

No rule has ever been implemented to limit the nationality or country of birth of the competing artists; many competing countries with a small population, such as Luxembourg and Monaco, were regularly represented by artists and composers from other countries, and several winning artists in the contest's history have held a different nationality or were born in a different country to that which they represented in the contest.

Each competing performance may feature a maximum of six people on stage, and may not contain live animals. Since 1990, all performers must have had turned 16 in the year the contest was held; this rule was introduced after two artists in the 1989 contest were 11 and 12 years old on the day of the contest, which caused the broadcasters from a few competing countries to complain. Several participating broadcasters organising national finals are changing the minimum age for its performers to 18 starting in 2027, a change that was subsequently confirmed with the release of the updated general rules by the EBU. This rule's introduction means that Sandra Kim, who won the contest for Belgium in 1986 at the age of 13, would remain the contest's youngest winner until the rule is changed. No performer may compete for more than one country at the contest in a given year.

== Live music ==
Live music has been an integral part of the contest since its first edition. The main vocals of the competing songs must be sung live on stage, however other rules on pre-recorded musical accompaniment have changed over time.

The orchestra was a prominent feature of the contest from 1956 to 1998. Pre-recorded backing tracks were first allowed in the contest in 1973, but under this rule the only instruments which could be pre-recorded had to also be seen being "performed" on stage; in 1997, this rule was changed to allow all instrumental music to be pre-recorded, however the host broadcaster was still required to provide an orchestra. In 1999, the rules were changed again, making the orchestra an optional requirement; the host broadcaster of the 1999 contest, Israel's IBA, subsequently decided not to provide an orchestra as a cost saving measure, meaning that all entries would use pre-recorded instrumentation for the first time in the contest's history. Since then, all instrumental music for competing entries has been pre-recorded, with a provision in the rules prohibiting instruments from being plugged in, thus only allowing them to be used as silent props. Two recent exceptions to the rule have occurred: Lucio Corsi, who represented Italy in 2025, played his harmonica into the singing microphone, which technically still complied with existing rules; and Linda Lampenius, who represented Finland in 2026 alongside Pete Parkkonen, was given special dispensation to play her violin live as it was "artistically justified".

Before 2020, all vocals were required to be performed live, with no natural voices of any kind or vocal imitations allowed on backing tracks. The entry for Croatia in 1999 was sanctioned after the contest for including synthesised male vocals in defiance of this rule, with Croatia subsequently penalised through the docking of its score at that year's contest by 33%, for the purposes of calculating the five-year points average in determining which countries would be relegated in future contests. Ahead of the 2021 contest, in an effort to make the contest more flexible to change following the cancellation of the 2020 edition and to facilitate modernisation, recorded backing vocals were permitted as an optional addition. An example of this is "10 Years", the entry for Iceland in 2021, which uses a choir in the bridge of the song. Delegations are still free to provide live backing vocals if they prefer, and all lead vocals performing the melody of the song, including by the lead vocalist(s) and any supporting vocalists, must still be performed live.

== Language ==
As Eurovision is a song contest, all competing entries must include vocals and lyrics of some kind; purely instrumental pieces have never been allowed. Presently competing entries may be performed in any language, be that natural or constructed, however the rules on the language(s) in which an entry may be performed have varied over the course of the contest's history.

From 1956 to 1965, there were no rules in place to dictate which language a country may perform in, however all entries up to 1964 were performed in one of their countries' national languages. In 1965, Sweden broke with this tradition by sending an entry in English; a new language rule was subsequently introduced in the 1966 contest for all competing entries, preventing them from being performed in any language other than one of the relevant country's official national languages.

The language rule was first abolished in 1973, allowing all participating countries to sing in the language of their choice, but was reintroduced ahead of the 1977 contest. However, as the process for choosing the entries for Belgium and Germany had already begun before the rule change was announced, they were permitted to perform in English for that year's edition. The language rule was abolished once again in 1999, resulting in 14 of that year's 23 competing entries featuring English lyrics. The large majority of entries at each year's contest are now performed in English, given its status as a lingua franca; at the 2017 contest, only four songs did not contain any English lyrics. Following Salvador Sobral's victory in that year's contest with a song in Portuguese, the 2018 contest saw an increased number of entries in another language than English, a trend which was repeated in 2019. In 2021, the first, second, and third places were all won by non-English songs for the first time since 1995. 26 of the 37 entries in 2025 wholly or partially contained lyrics in the participating countries' national languages.

The freedom of language has, however, provided opportunities for artists to perform songs which would not have been possible previously, with a number of competing entries in this millennium having been performed in an invented language, and artists have also used this linguistic freedom to perform in languages other than English which are also not official languages of their country.

As the contest is presented in both English and French, at least one of the contest's hosts must be able to speak French as well as English.

== Running order ==
The order in which the competing entries perform had historically been decided through a random draw, however, since 2013, the order has been determined by the contest's production team, and submitted to the EBU executive supervisor and reference group for approval before being publicly announced. This change was introduced to provide a better experience for television viewers, making the show more exciting and allowing all entries to stand out by avoiding cases where songs of similar style or tempo were performed in sequence. Under the current method, during the semi-final allocation draw, each country competing in a semi-final is drawn into either the first half or second half of that semi-final; once all songs have been selected the producers will then determine the running order for the semi-finals. Semi-final qualifiers make a draw at random during the qualifiers' press conference to determine whether they will perform during the first, second half, or a producer-determined position of the final; the automatic finalists will also randomly draw their competing half or producer-determined position in the run-up to the final, except for the host country, whose exact performance position is determined at random in a separate draw. The running order for the final is then decided following the second semi-final by the producers. The running orders are decided with the competing songs' musical quality, stage performance, prop and lighting set-up, and other production considerations taken into account.

The process change in 2013 led to a mixed reaction from fans of the contest, with some expressing concern over potential corruption in allowing the producers to decide at which point each country would perform, while others were more optimistic about the change. The order in which competing entries perform is considered an important factor in the potential of winning the contest, and statistical analysis on this subject has been shown to corroborate that in a random draw songs which perform later in the contest have a better chance of being scored highly. Performing second in the final is particularly considered detrimental to an entry's chances of winning the contest, and no song performing in this position has ever won the contest in its history. However, of the current appearing positions, numbers 16, 25 and 26 in the running order have never won either. Position 17 has won the most, with seven times.

== Voting ==
Various voting systems have been used in the history of the contest to determine the placing of the competing songs. The current system has been in place since 2026, which works on the basis of positional voting. Each country awards two sets of points: one set is based on the votes of each professional jury appointed by each participating broadcaster, consisting of seven music professionals from that country; and a second set is based on the views of the general public in the competing countries conducted through telephone and SMS voting or via voting conducted through the official Eurovision app. Each set of points consists of 1–8, 10, and 12 points to the jury and public's 10 favourite songs, with the most preferred song receiving 12 points. Since 2023, viewers in non-participating countries are also able to vote via an online platform, with the votes aggregated and awarded as one set of points, known as "Rest of the World" and equivalent to one participating country. National juries and the public in each country are not allowed to vote for their own country, a rule first introduced in 1957.

Historically, each country's points were determined by a jury, which has at times consisted of members of the public, music professionals, or both in combination. With advances in telecommunication technology, and in response to criticism regarding some jury picks for the contest winner, televoting was first introduced to the contest in 1997 on a trial basis. At that year's contest, broadcasters in Austria, Germany, Sweden, Switzerland and the United Kingdom allowed their viewing public to determine their votes for the first time, and from 1998 televoting was extended to almost all competing countries. The 2004 contest was the first to make televoting mandatory for all competing countries, however each country was obligated to provide a "backup jury", which would be used in case of voting failure, or if the number of votes registered did not pass a set threshold to be considered valid. A jury was reintroduced for the final of the 2009 contest, with each country's points comprising both the votes of the jury and public in an equal split. This mix of jury and public voting was expanded into the semi-finals from 2010, and was used until 2023, when full public voting was reintroduced to determine the results of the semi-finals. The mix of jury and public voting continues to be used in the final, and returned to the semi-finals in 2026.

The current voting system is a modification of that used in the contest since 1975, when the "1–8, 10, 12 points" system was first introduced. Until 2016, each country provided one set of points, representing the votes of either the country's jury, public or, since the 2009 final, the votes of both combined.

=== Presentation of the votes ===
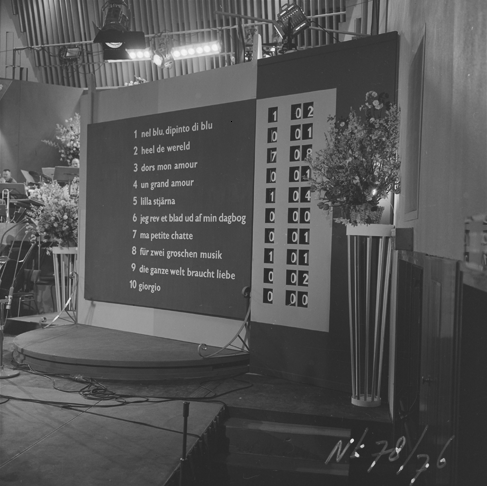
The scoreboard at the 1958 contest

Since 1957, each country's votes have been announced during a special voting segment as part of the contest's broadcast. After each country's votes have been calculated and verified, and following performances during the interval, the presenter(s) of the contest will call upon a spokesperson in each country in turn to invite them to announce the results of their country's vote in English or French. This spokesperson is typically a musician, broadcaster or journalist who is well known in their country, and previous spokespersons have included former Eurovision artists and presenters. Prior to 1994 the announcements were made through telephone lines from the countries of origin, with the audio piped through into the auditorium for the audience to hear and over the television transmission; the 1994 contest saw the introduction of satellite links for the voting, which has allowed the spokespersons to be seen visually by the audience and television spectators.

The votes from each country are tallied via a scoreboard, which typically shows the total number of points each country has so far received, as well as the points being given out by the country currently being called upon by the presenter(s). The scoreboard was first introduced in 1957; voting at the first contest was held behind closed doors, but taking inspiration from the UK's Festival of British Popular Songs which featured voting by regional juries, the EBU decided to incorporate this idea into its own contest. This scoreboard was historically situated physically to the side of the stage and was updated manually as each country gave their votes; a graphical representation of this scoreboard was first introduced at the 1988 contest, which in recent contests is able to sort itself to place the country with the most votes at the top.

Historically, each country's spokesperson would announce sequentially the number of points being given to a specific country, which would then be repeated by the contest's presenter(s) in both English and French. With the increase in the number of competing countries, and therefore the number of countries voting in the final, the voting sequence soon became a lengthy process. From 2006, to save time, only each country's 8, 10 and 12 points were announced by their spokesperson, with points 1–7 displayed on-screen and then automatically added to the scoreboard. Since the introduction of the new voting system in 2016, the spokespersons now announce only their country's 12 points, with their 8 and 10 points now also being shown and added automatically.

From 1957 to 1962, the order in which the participating countries announced their votes was in reverse order of the presentation of their songs; from 1963 to 2003, countries were called upon in the same order in which they presented their songs, with the exception of the 1974 contest, where a drawing of lots was used to decide the order in which countries were called upon. With the introduction of semi-finals in 2004, a new system to determine the order of voting was required to account for the countries which failed to qualify for the final: in 2004, the countries were called upon in alphabetical order according to their two-letter ISO country codes; and in 2005, the votes of the non-qualifying semi-finalists were announced first, in the order in which they performed in the semi-final, followed by the finalist countries in the order in which they performed in the final. From 2006 to 2010, similar to 1974, a separate draw was held to determine the voting order; this draw was scrapped in 2011, and a new logarithmic system was implemented which used the jury votes submitted following the "jury final" dress rehearsal in an attempt to ensure the winner did not become apparent early on in the voting sequence, and subsequently to create a more suspenseful and exciting experience for the viewers.

Since 2016, the voting presentation begins with each country's spokespersons being called upon in turn to announce the points of their country's professional jury. Once the jury points from all countries have been announced, the contest's presenter(s) will then announce the total public points received for each finalist, with the votes for each country being consolidated and announced as a single value. From 2016 to 2018, the public points were announced in order from last to first, with the country with the lowest total score announced first; since 2019, these points have been announced in order according to their placing by the juries, with the country that received the fewest points from the juries receiving their public points first. The full televoting results, and the votes of each country's jury and individual jury members, are published on the official Eurovision website after the show; each country's individual televoting points are also typically displayed on-screen towards the end of the show by that country's broadcaster.

=== Ties for first place ===
Since 1970, the rules of the contest have outlined how to determine the winning act in cases where two or more countries have the same number of points at the end of the voting. The method of breaking a tie has changed over time, and the current tie-break rule has been in place since 2016. In this event, a combined national televoting and jury result is calculated for each country, and the winner is the song which has obtained points from the highest number of countries.

The first tie-break rule was introduced following the 1969 contest, when four of the sixteen countries taking part—France, Spain, the Netherlands, and the United Kingdom—all finished the voting with an equal number of votes. As there was no rule in place to break the tie, all four were declared joint winners. This result led to complaints from a number of other competing broadcasters, and several refused to take part in 1970 in protest.

To date, on only one occasion since 1969 has there been a tie for first place: in 1991, the entries from Sweden and France had received 146 points each at the end of the voting. The tie-breaking rule in place at the time specified that the country which had received the most sets of 12 points would be declared the winner; if there was still a tie, then the 10 points received, followed by 8 points, etc. would be used to break the tie. Both France and Sweden had received four sets of 12 points, however as Sweden had received more individual 10 points than France, Sweden's Carola was declared the winner.

Overview of tie-breaking rules
Year	Use	Description
1956–1969	—N/a	No tie-breaking rules were in place.
1970–1988	Only to determine the winner.	The jury decided the winner through a simple vote for their favourite.
1989–2000	Only to determine the winner.	The winner of a tie is the country that received more 12 points, then 10 points. If the tie cannot be broken in this way, all tied countries are winners.
2001–2002	To determine the winner To determine the qualifiers for the following year.	The winner of a tie is the country that received more 12 points, then 10 points, all the way down to 1. If the tie cannot be broken in this way, all tied countries are winners.
2003	Only to determine the winner.	The winner of a tie is the country that received points from more countries, then the country that received more 12 points, then 10 points, all the way down to 1. If the tie cannot be broken in this way, all tied countries are winners.
2004–2006	To determine the winner To determine the 10th qualifier from the semi-final.	The winner of a tie is the country that received points from more countries, then the country that received more 12 points, then 10 points, all the way down to 1. If the tie cannot be broken in this way, all tied countries are winners.
2007	To determine the winner To determine the 10th qualifier from the semi-final.	The winner of a tie is the country that received points from more countries, then the country that received more 12 points, then 10 points, all the way down to 1. If the tie cannot be broken in this way, the country that performed earlier wins the tie.
2008–2015	Used for all ties.	The winner of a tie is the country that received points from more countries, then the country that received more 12 points, then 10 points, all the way down to 1. If the tie cannot be broken in this way, the country that performed earlier wins the tie.
2016–present	Used for all ties.	The winner of a tie is the country that received more points from the televoting, then the country that received points from more countries in the televoting, then the country that received more 12 points in the televoting, then 10 points, all the way down to 1. If the tie cannot be broken in this way, the country that performed earlier wins the tie.

=== Validation and observation ===
A number of steps have been established to ensure that a valid voting result is obtained and that transparency in the vote and results is observed.

Each country's professional jury, as well as individual jury members, must meet a set criteria to be eligible, regarding professional background, and diversity in gender and age. A set criteria against which the competing entries should be evaluated is published by the EBU, and all jury members pledge in writing that they will use these criteria when ranking the entries, as well as stating that they are not connected to any of the contestants in any way that could influence their decision. Additionally, jury members may only sit on a jury once every three years. Each jury member votes independently of the other members of the jury, and no discussion or deliberation about the vote between members is permitted.

Since 2004, the televoting in each country has been overseen by the contest's official voting partner, the Germany-based Once (formerly Digame). This company gathers all televotes and, since 2009, jury votes in all countries, which are then processed by the company's pan-European response platform, based out of its voting control centre in Cologne. This system ensures that all votes are counted in accordance with the rules, and that any attempts to unfairly influence the vote are detected and mitigated. The entire voting process is overseen by independent observers from an external auditing company, with professional services firm Ernst & Young assuming this role since 2019.

== Broadcasting ==
Participating broadcasters are required to air live in their countries the semi-final in which they compete, or in the case of the automatic finalists the semi-final in which they are required to vote, and the final, in its entirety, including all competing songs, the voting recap which contains short clips of the performances, the voting procedure or semi-final qualification reveal, and in the final the reprise of the winning song. Since 1999, broadcasters who wished to do so were given the opportunity to provide advertising during short, non-essential hiatuses in the show's schedule.

On a number of occasions, participating broadcasters have been forced to delay or postpone broadcast of one or more live shows due to mitigating circumstances: in 2000, the broadcast of the contest was interrupted in the Netherlands to provide emergency news coverage of the Enschede fireworks disaster, which meant a televote could not be held and the country's backup jury was used to provide the country's points; and in 2012, RTSH broadcast the first semi-final in Albania, in which it was competing, deferred to provide coverage of the Qafa e Vishës bus accident. In both of these cases no sanctions were levied against the broadcasters due to the emergency nature of the incidents, however in 2009, when RTVE deferred broadcast of the second semi-final in Spain to provide continuing coverage of the Madrid Open tennis tournament, the EBU announced that sanctions would be levied against the broadcaster.

The contest was first produced in colour in 1968, and has been broadcast in widescreen since 2005, and in high-definition since 2007. Ultra-high-definition broadcasts were tested for the first time in 2022.

=== Archive status ===
An archiving project was initiated by the EBU in 2011, aiming to collate footage from all editions of the contest and related materials from its history ahead of the contest's 60th edition in 2015. In collaborating with member broadcasters, the EBU now holds all editions of the contest except for the 1956 and 1964 editions, of which only the winner's reprise exist on video.

The video footage which may have been recorded of the first contest in 1956 has since been lost over time, though a full audio recording of the show has been preserved, and a short Kinescope newsreel of Lys Assia's reprise of her winning song "Refrain" has survived. Conflicting reports of the fate of any video footage of the 1964 contest in Copenhagen have been recanted over the years: one claim is that footage of the contest was destroyed in a fire at the studios of Danish broadcaster DR in the 1970s, with no footage from other broadcasters known to exist; other claims include that footage of the contest was lost when the tape was wiped by DR management for use in recording new programming, or that DR did not record the show at all due to a lack of available video tape recorders. As with the 1956 contest, audio recordings of the 1964 contest, and some footage of the opening sequence and Gigliola Cinquetti's reprise of her winning song "Non ho l'età" have survived. The EBU issued an open call for the public to recover more footage from both missing editions in April 2026.

The copyright of each individual contest from 1956 to 2003 is held by the respective organising host broadcaster for that year's contest; copyright for contests held from 2004 onwards is held centrally by the EBU.

== Rule changes by year ==
- 1956: First contest – each of the seven participating broadcasters were recommended to hold a national selection to choose their entries. They could send a maximum of two songs each. Participating songs should not exceed 3 to 3.5 minutes. Two jurors from each of the participating countries is to watch the transmission on a television screen, and rate each song from 1 to 10, with higher scores being more appreciated. The 14 scores are added and the winner(s) are the songs with the highest total score.
- 1957: Each country would only send one song from this year on. The voting was made public for the first time. Each of the ten jurors awards a single point to their favourite song – so in theory a country could be awarded all 10 points, although the highest tally allocated under this system was 9 by the Danish jury for France in 1958 and the Belgian jury for Ireland in 1970. Juries are no longer allowed to vote for their own country, after being allowed to in 1956.
- 1958: After Italy's song in 1957 lasted 5 minutes and 9 seconds, the maximum song length was limited to 3 minutes – which still applies. The convention of the winning broadcaster being invited to host the following year's contest is introduced. However, several of them declined the opportunity in subsequent years.
- 1959: Professional publishers or composers were no longer allowed in the national juries.
- 1962: The voting system changes. Each country had 10 jury members who awarded their three favourite songs 3, 2, and 1 points in order. Previously each of the ten jury members awarded 1 point to their favourite song.
- 1963: The jury size is doubled to 20 and the points awarded were 5, 4, 3, 2 and 1.
- 1964: The jury size reverts to 10, and points are now 5, 3 and 1. It becomes possible for a unanimous jury to award all 9 points to one song – but this never occurred. It was also possible to give 6 and 3 points to two songs; this happened only in 1965, when the Belgian jury gave 6 points to the United Kingdom and 3 points to Italy.
- 1966: Songs must now be sung in one of the national languages of the country they represent after Sweden's entry was sung in English.
- 1967: The scoring system reverts to the one used between 1957 and 1961.
- 1970: Following a four-way tie in the 1969 contest, a tie-break rule was introduced with provision for a sing-off and a show of hands from the juries to elect a winner.
- 1971: Another voting system change is introduced. Each country had two jury members, one under 25 and one over 25, with at least ten years' difference between their ages. They each awarded 1 to 5 points for each song. This created an issue where some juries gave fewer points out than others. The rule permitting groups of up to six performers on stage was introduced. Previously, entrants could only perform solo or as a duet.
- 1973: The rule forcing countries to sing in one of their national languages is relaxed – however this is only in place for four years. For the first time, music played on backing tracks was allowed, although any instrument heard on one had to be seen on stage as well.
- 1974: The scoring system used between 1957 and 1961 and between 1967 and 1970 is restored for a third time.
- 1975: A scoring system reminiscent of the current system is introduced. Each jury would now give 12 points to the best song, 10 to the second best, then 8 to the third, 7 to the fourth, 6 to the fifth and so forth until the tenth best song received a single point. Unlike today, the points were not announced in order (from 1 up to 12), but in the order the songs were performed.
- 1976: As the cost of staging the contest increases, a new rule was introduced that, in future, each participating broadcaster would have to pay a fee to finance the cost of staging the contest.
- 1977: Countries must again revert to singing in their own national languages. Belgium and Germany had already chosen English-language songs before the announcement of this rule change, so were granted permission to keep their songs in English.
- 1980: The jury spokesperson now reads the points out in numerical order (1, 2, 3, 4, 5, 6, 7, 8, 10, and 12) rather than in song order.
- 1987: As the number of countries reached a record of 22, the EBU imposed a limit on the number of countries competing. Although set at 22, this limit has varied slightly over the years.
- 1989: Following the closeness of the result at the 1988 contest, the tiebreak rule was amended. If a tie was to occur the winner would be declared by whichever received the most 12 points; if that still failed to separate them, the one with the most 10 points would be declared the winner. If there is still a tie, the same process is used with the 8 points, and so on until there is no longer a tie.
- 1990: Following Sandra Kim's win for Belgium in 1986 at the age of 13 and controversy over two performers in 1989 being just 11 and 12 years old, a restriction on the competitors' ages was introduced. The minimum age is now 16 at the time of the event.
- 1993: With the admission into the EBU of the broadcasters of the countries that emerged from the breakup of Yugoslavia, and the merger of the EBU with its Eastern European counterpart, the International Radio and Television Organisation (OIRT), a pre-qualifying round was introduced.
- 1994: Relegation had to be introduced to accommodate the increasing number of broadcasters wishing to compete. Initially the bottom seven countries from 1993 would be relegated from 1994 contest. The relegation rules would change slightly over subsequent years.
- 1996: The number of countries that can compete is increased to 23.
- 1997: After controversy over a 1996 pre-selection procedure (similar to 1993) which resulted in Germany being omitted from the contest, the selection procedure changed to allow only the countries with the best average scores over the previous four years. Following the appearance of a Macintosh computer on stage during the United Kingdom's performance the previous year, the rule on backing tracks was relaxed, so that countries were free to use any combination of live and recorded music of their choice without the requirement for any instruments to be seen on stage. Televoting was trialled in five countries and would become the preferred method of voting from 1998.
- 1999: Restrictions are lifted again allowing countries to sing in any language. The use of a live orchestra was dropped as a way to conserve money for the show; since then, all songs have used pre-recorded backing tracks.
- 2000: The "Big Four" rule is introduced, giving France, Germany, Spain, and the United Kingdom automatic entry in the contest regardless of previous performance. In 2011, Italy returned to the competition, expanding the group to a "Big Five".
- 2002: The number of countries that can compete is increased to 24.
- 2003: The number of countries that can compete is increased to 26.
- 2004: Relegation rules, which had varied slightly since 1994, were dropped and a semi-final was introduced. 24 countries compete in the final. Countries eliminated in the semi-final were still allowed to vote on the final, so the convention of reading the scores in both French and English was dropped. The spokesperson would now read the score in one language with presenters repeating in the other language.
- 2006: Spokespersons no longer read out all the points from 1 up to 12. Instead the scores up to 7 points are displayed briefly before the spokesperson reads out their 8, 10, and 12 point allocations.
- 2008: With a record 43 entries, a second semi-final was introduced. Juries were used to allocate a wild-card place in the final from each of the semi-finals. 25 countries now compete in the final.
- 2009: Due to criticism of the voting system following the 2007 contest, changes in the voting procedure were made with the re-introduction of a national jury alongside televoting (split 50/50). This format would be extended to the semi-finals in 2010.
- 2010: Televoting in all three shows is open from the first song until the end of the voting.
- 2012: The 15-minute televoting window is restored due to criticism of the voting method after the 2011 contest. 26 countries now compete in the final, due to Italy's return in 2011. A new upper limit of only 20 votes per phone number is imposed.
- 2013: The format of the jury/televoting result is changed slightly in that all songs are now ranked instead of being given a score in each method. This is then merged and the ten highest ranked songs receive points in the usual manner. Also, for the first time, the running order in all three shows is determined by producers of the show instead of a random draw, which is supposed to give each song competing a fair chance of success.
- 2015: The EBU considers the possibility of inviting associate members from countries outside of the European Broadcasting Area or the Council of Europe to participate in future editions of the contest. The first of such "guest nations" was Australia in 2015. This also increases the number of countries competing in the final for the year to 27.
- 2016: A new voting system is introduced. Entries now receive one set of points from the jury and one set of points from televoting. First, the jury votes are announced in the usual way, giving 1 up to 12 points but with only the 12 points being read by the spokesperson. Then, the televotes are read by the presenters, starting with the country receiving the fewest televote points and ending with the country that received the most televote points, so the winner is not known until the end of the show. In addition, the number of countries competing in the final is reduced back to 26 as Australia now competes in the semi-final.
- 2018: The rankings of individual jurors in each country are combined using an exponentially weighted formula.
- 2019: The order of the televoting presentation is changed. Instead of presenting the televoting results in the order of fewest to most points, the points are given in the order of the final jury voting ranking, meaning the country with the fewest jury points receives its televote points first, and the winner of the jury votes hears its final score last.
- 2021: Pre-recorded backing vocals are permitted in an effort to introduce flexibility following the cancellation of the 2020 edition and to facilitate modernisation.
- 2023: Re-introduction of full televoting for the semi-finals. Online voting is introduced for viewers in non-participating countries for all shows, with their votes aggregated and awarded as one set of televoting points.
- 2024: Televoting in the final is open from the first song until the end of the voting. Two online voting windows are open for viewers in non-participating countries for all shows, with one lasting 24 hours before the shows, and one occurring during the shows.
- 2026: Re-introduction of juries for the semi-finals, the jury size is increased from five to seven, and two jurors must be between 18 and 25 years old.

=== Chronology ===
Rules overview
Rule	1956	1957	1958 to 1965	1966 to 1969	1970	1971 to 1972	1973 to 1976	1977 to 1986	1987 to 1988	1989	1990 to 1992	1993	1994 to 1995	1996	1997	1998	1999 to 2000	2001	2002	2003	2004 to 2006	2007	2008	2009	2010 to 2015	2016 to 2018	2019	2021 to 2022	2023 to 2025	2026	2027
Songs per country	2	1																													
Max. # of lead vocalists	1 (Note: Up to 5 backing vocalists allowed.)	2 (Note: Up to 5 backing vocalists allowed for soloists, up to 4 backing vocalists allowed for duets.)				6 (Note: Up to 6 performers allowed on stage in total.)																									
Song length	None (Note: 3:30 is the recommended max length of a song.)		3:00 or less																												
Language	None (Note: Up until 1964, every country sang in its native language, and an unofficial rule was that every country would do that. In 1965, Sweden sent a song in English, so the rule was formally introduced.)			Native			Any (Note: No rules restricting language usage.)	Native									Any														
Live vocals	All vocals must be live																											Lead (Note: Only lead vocals have to be live. Backing vocals can be live or pre-recorded.)			
Voting for own country	Allowed	Banned																													
Orchestra	Orchestra only						Orchestra only, backing track allowed, but instruments on it had to be seen on stage								Free (Note: Each country would decide if they wanted to use the orchestra or the backing track.)		Backing track only, no orchestra														
Age limit	Any										Min. 16 years old																				Min. 18 years old
Participants limit	None								22					23					24	26	40	45	46				44				
Qualifications	A single final											KzM	Relegation (Note: Worst-scoring countries in the previous contest would have to skip the next contest.)	PQR	Relegation (Note: Worst-scoring countries over a period of 5 years would have to skip a contest.)				Relegation		SF (Note: A single semi-final is held where 10 countries qualify. 24 countries compete in the final.)	2 SFs (Note: 2 semi-finals are held, with 10 countries qualifying from each.)									
Jury or televoting	Jury														Televoting test (Note: 5 countries tested televoting, while the other 20 used juries.)	Televoting (Note: A few countries used a jury.)		Choice between full jury, full televoting or tele/jury 50/50		Televoting				Televoting in SFs, tele/jury 50/50 in final	Tele/jury 50/50	Jury and televoting			Televoting in SFs, both in final	Jury and televoting	Unknown
Tiebreakers	None				Winner tiebreak (Note: A tie is still possible.)					Winner tiebreak											1st in final and 10th in semi-finals		Full tiebreaker								

== See also ==
- Voting at the Eurovision Song Contest

== Sources ==
- O'Connor, John Kennedy (2010). The Eurovision Song Contest: The Official History (2nd ed.). London: Carlton Books. ISBN 978-1-84732-521-1.
- Roxburgh, Gordon (2012). Songs for Europe: The United Kingdom at the Eurovision Song Contest. Vol. One: The 1950s and 1960s. Prestatyn: Telos Publishing. ISBN 978-1-84583-065-6.
