= Diesen (surname) =

Diesen is a surname. Notable people with the surname include:

- Deborah Diesen, American children's book author
- Einar Diesen (1897–1994), Norwegian journalist and newspaper editor
- Emil Diesen (1880–1942), Norwegian civil servant and editor
- Erik Diesen (1922–1999), Norwegian revue writer and radio and television personality
- Erling Diesen (born 1932), Norwegian engineer and civil servant
- Ernst Diesen (1913–1970), Norwegian actor and theatre director
- Henry Diesen (1883–1953), Norwegian naval officer
- Kari Diesen (1914–1987), Norwegian singer and revue actress
- Mark Diesen (1957–2008), American chess player
- Sverre Diesen (born 1949), Norwegian military officer
- Thorstein Diesen (1862–1925), Norwegian barrister, newspaper editor and politician
- Trygve Allister Diesen (born 1967), Norwegian director, producer, and screenwriter
