= Harald Heide =

Norwegian violinist, conductor, and composer

Harald Heide (March 8, 1876 – January 27, 1956) was a Norwegian violinist, conductor, and composer.

Heide was born in Fredrikstad, the son of the violin-maker Johan Albert Heide (1847–1925). He studied music theory and violin at the Oslo Conservatory of Music from 1891 to 1896, and after that studied violin in Berlin under Florián Zajíc. He taught at the Bergen Music School from 1898 to 1899 and was the concertmaster at the National Theater orchestra in Oslo from 1899 to 1903. He then studied under César Thomson in Brussels, followed by a tour as a concert violinist in England and the United States. In 1907 he became the conductor at the National Theater in Bergen, working there from 1907 to 1919 and again from 1925 to 1926.

Heide's main occupation in Bergen was as director of the Bergen Philharmonic Orchestra—at that time still named the Harmony Music Society (Musikselskabet Harmonien)—from 1907 to 1948. Under Heide's management, the orchestra's program was expanded, from six to eight concerts per year to over 80, and it was also better staffed with musicians for all of the positions in a symphony orchestra. Heide was a guest conductor in Helsinki in 1924, in Göteborg in 1928, and in Stockholm in 1931. Under his direction, the Harmony Music Society performed over 6,000 works by 455 different composers.

Heide's compositions for orchestra, including his Symphonie romantique, were stylistically influenced by Johan Halvorsen.

In 1929, Heide married the singer Henriette Strindberg, née Nielsen (1894–1964). After her debut in 1918, she performed in operas and operettas in Oslo and Bergen, and also as a concert singer in these cities and in London. She later worked as a voice instructor at the Bergen Conservatory.

Harald Heide was the brother of the actress Signe Heide Steen (1881–1959), who was the mother of the singer Randi Heide Steen, the actor Harald Heide Steen, and the actress Kari Diesen.

He died in Bergen.

== Honors and awards ==
Heide received the Order of St. Olav, knight first class, in 1945.
