= The Sausage-Maker Who Disappeared =

1941 film by Toralf Sandø

- Directed by: Toralf Sandø
- Written by: Toralf Sandø
- Starring: Leif Juster; Ernst Diesen
- Release date: 26 December 1941
- Running time: 85 minutes
- Country: Norway
- Language: Norwegian

The Sausage-Maker Who Disappeared (Norwegian: Den forsvundne pølsemakere) is a 1941 Norwegian comedy film written and directed by Toralf Sandø, starring Leif Juster and Ernst Diesen. Private investigators Gløgg (Diesen) and Rask (Juster) have been hired to trace a butcher (or sausage-maker) who has disappeared. This leads the two into a number of adventures. The movie is today best known for Juster's performance of the song "Pølsemaker, pølsemaker".

== Cast ==
- Leif Juster as private detective Stein Rask
- Ernst Diesen as Simon Gløgg, Rask's assistant
- Joachim Holst-Jensen as sausage-maker H. Brand
- Eva Steen as Mrs. H. Brand
- Eva Lunde as Solveig Brand
- Jens Gundersen as actor Ivar Johansen
- Kristian Hefte as butcher's friend Rudolf Jensen
- Wenche Klouman as Malla Hansen
- Leif Enger as engineer Barratt
- Lisi Carén as dancer Flora
- Kari Diesen as maid
- Marie Therese Øgaard as Marie Therese
- Jon Sund as lecturer
- Jack Fjeldstad as waiter
- Herman Hansen as man on tram
- Harald Aimarsen as Brodersen
- Inger Jacobsen as radio singer
- Tryggve Larssen as Barrat'sassistant Bukki Matti
