= Emil Diesen =

Norwegian civil servant and editor

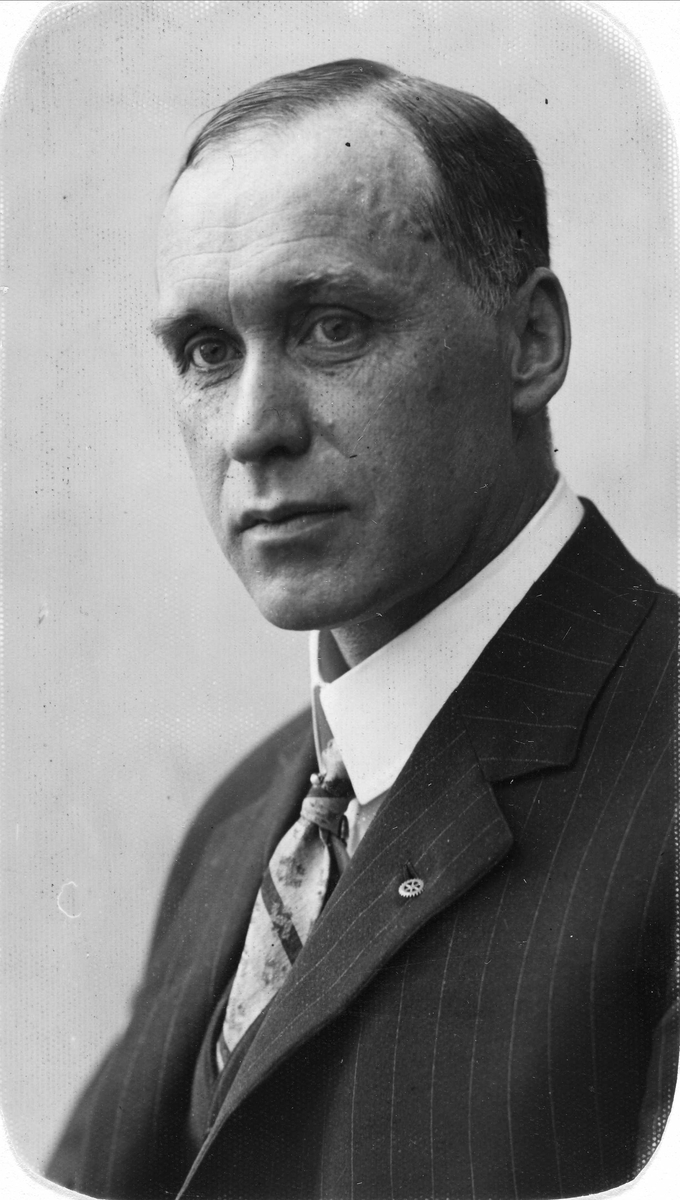
Emil Diesen in the 1930s

Emil Diesen (14 April 1880 – 24 June 1942) was a Norwegian civil servant and editor.

== Personal life ==
He was born in Norderhov a son of captain Ernst Georg Diesen (1841–1908) and Anna Kathrine Fredrikke Elisabeth Seip (1851–1930). He was a brother of Andreas Melchior Seip Diesen, first cousin of Henry Diesen, uncle of Ernst Diesen and granduncle of Andreas Diesen.

In 1913 he married German citizen Emmy Anna Adelheid Benecke. Their daughter Dagmar was married to Christian August Anker for some time.

== Career ==
He finished his secondary education in 1898, graduated from the Royal Frederick University with the cand.jur. degree in 1907 and the cand.oecon. degree in 1908. He was hired as a secretary in National Insurance Administration in 1908, and after some years as secretary of the Norwegian Insurance Council since 1913 and teacher at the Norwegian Institute of Technology since 1915, he returned as head of department in the Insurance Administration in 1917. Already after one year, in 1918 he became editor-in-chief of the magazine Økonomisk Revy. While at the Norwegian Institute of Technology he chaired the Student Society in Trondhjem from 1915 to 1916.

He was a prolific economical writer. His largest work was Norsk industri- og næringshaandbok, a registry of several branches of Norwegian industry and business. It was released in several volumes between 1917 and 1921. A volume was dedicated to mechanical workshops, others to the finishing industry, paper industry, mining and metallurgic industry, timber industry, textile industry, sports equipment manufacturing, construction and food and beverage industry. There were also handbooks for the banking and insurance industries, and one volume covered the press and journalists in Norway at the time. He later issued several yearbooks of "exchange rates of the world", and his last books were about the banks of specific counties.

From 1931 to 1933 he chaired the Norwegian Specialized Press Association. He was also vice chairman of the Norwegian Polytechnic Society group on state economics.

He died in June 1942 and was buried at Vestre gravlund.
