= Henry Diesen =

Norwegian naval officer (1883–1953)

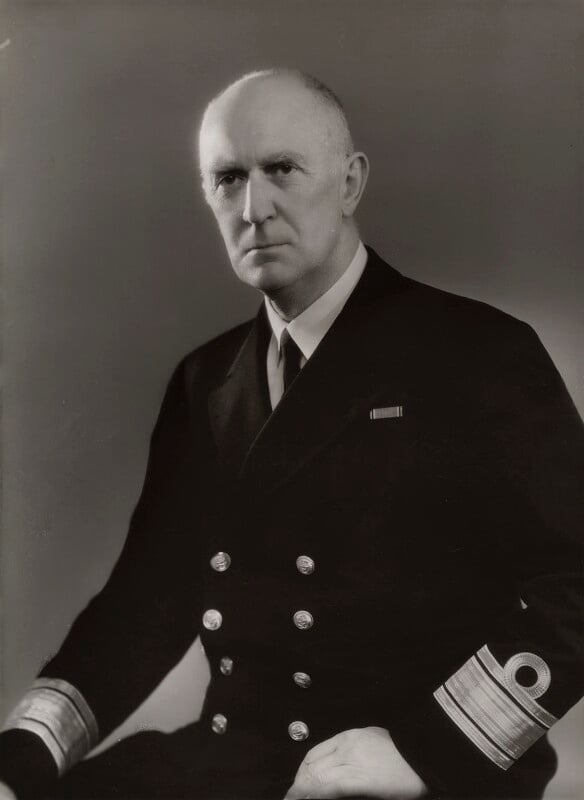
Diesen in 1940

Henry Edward Diesen (3 April 1883 – 7 January 1953) was a Norwegian naval officer.

He was born in Trondhjem as the son of telegrapher Edward Diesen (1852–1909) and Johanne Christophine Stenersen (1855–1936). He was a first cousin of Emil Diesen and Andreas Melchior Seip Diesen, and a first cousin once removed of Andreas’s son Ernst Diesen.

He became a naval officer from 1903, graduated from the Norwegian Naval Academy in 1905, and was promoted to Premier Lieutenant in 1906. He worked in the merchant fleet from 1906 to 1908 and 1909 to 1911. From 1912 to 1913, he studied at the Technische Hochschule in Charlottenburg (now Technische Universität Berlin). He served in the neutral Royal Norwegian Navy during World War I and was promoted to Captain in 1917. His last service on a ship was as second-in-command of HNoMS Tordenskjold in 1929.

He lived in Borre, near Karljohansvern. Here he edited the newspaper Hortens Avis from 1919 to 1920 and was a member of the executive committee of Borre municipal council from 1920 to 1923. He married Caroline Elisabeth Fretheim (1886–1968) in November 1907.

From 1930 to 1936, Diesen was the second-in-command at the Navy Mining School. He was promoted to Commander in 1936. In 1937 he was appointed as chief of the Third Naval Defence District (Northern Norway), and in 1938 he became Commanding Admiral in Norway. He was also promoted to rear admiral. In 1940, Norway was invaded by Nazi Germany. Two months later, Diesen embarked the ship HNoMS Fridtjof Nansen with which he fled the country. The vessel left Norway on 10 June, arrived at Tórshavn, in the Faroe Islands, on 13 June and later sailed to the United Kingdom where she was made war ready. From then on the Royal Norwegian Navy was used in Allied warfare. He left his position as Commanding Admiral in August 1941, due to disagreements with the government, and served in the United States until 1944. From 1945 to 1947 he was the chief of Marinekommando Vestlandet.

He was decorated as a Commander with the Star of the Royal Norwegian Order of St. Olav in 1939. He died in January 1953 in Borre.

Military offices
Preceded by Edgar Otto	Commanding Admiral in Norway; 1938–1941	Succeeded by
