= Eurovision Young Dancers 2003 =

Dance competition

Dates and venue
- Semi-final: 2 July 2003
- Final: 4 July 2003
- Venue: Stadsschouwburg; Amsterdam, Netherlands

Organisation
- Organiser: European Broadcasting Union (EBU)
- Executive supervisor: Sarah Yuen

Production
- Host broadcaster: Nederlandse Programma Stichting (NPS)
- Director: Ross MacGibbon
- Executive producer: Henk van der Meulen
- Presenter: Aldith Hunkar

Participants
- Number of entries: 17
- Number of finalists: 10
- Debuting countries: Armenia (Note: Armenia took part for the first time in the semi-final since they did not reach the final. Their debut in a Final of the Young Dancers contest took place in 2013); Romania
- Non-returning countries: Austria; Germany; Ireland
- Participation map: frameless}} Participating countries Did not qualify from the semi-final Countries that participated in the past but not in 2003

Vote
- Voting system: A professional jury chose the finalists and gave points to each performance
- Winning dancers: Sweden Kristina Oom and Sebastian Michanek (contemporary dance); Ukraine Jerlin Ndudi (classical dance); Czech Republic Monika Hejduková and Viktor Konvalinka (Youth Jury Choice)

Eurovision Young Dancers 2003 was the 10th edition of Eurovision Young Dancers. It consisted of a semi-final on 2 July and a final on 4 July 2003, held at the Stadsschouwburg Theatre in Amsterdam, Netherlands, and presented by Aldith Hunkar. It was organised by the European Broadcasting Union (EBU) and host broadcaster Nederlandse Programma Stichting (NPS).

Dancers representing seventeen countries took part in the competition, with ten of them participating in the televised final. Armenia and Romania made their début while Austria, Germany and Ireland decided not to participate. This was the first EBU event to feature a representative from Armenia, who would subsequently debut at both the Eurovision Song Contest and Junior Eurovision Song Contest, three and four years later respectively.

Each participating broadcaster could send one or two dancers, male or female, not older than 20. All countries except the host (Netherlands) had to take part in the semi-final.

Duo Kristina Oom and Sebastian Michanek representing Sweden won the contemporary dance prize, with Jerlin Ndudi representing Ukraine winning the classical dance prize. Duo Monika Hejduková and Viktor Konvalinka representing Czech Republic won the 'Youth Jury Choice' award.

== Location ==
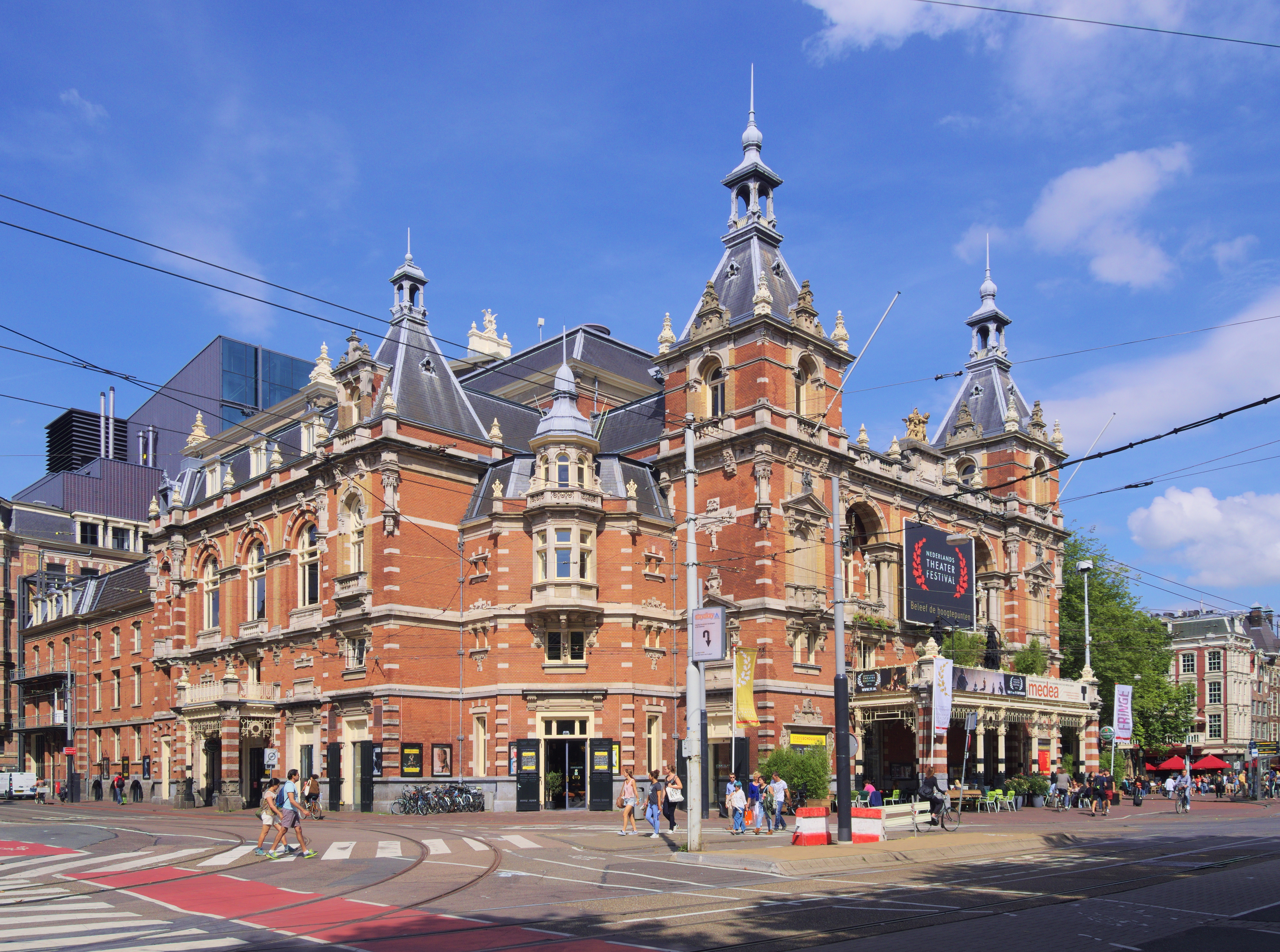
Stadsschouwburg Theatre

Stadsschouwburg Theatre in Amsterdam, Netherlands was the host venue for the 2003 edition of Eurovision Young Dancers. The building is in the neo-Renaissance style dating back to 1894, and is the former home of the National Ballet and Opera.

== Format ==
The format consists of dancers who are non-professional and between the ages of 16–21, competing in a performance of dance routines of their choice, which they have prepared in advance of the competition. All of the acts then take part in a choreographed group dance during 'Young Dancers Week'.

Jury members of a professional aspect and representing the elements of ballet, contemporary, and modern dancing styles, score each of the competing individual and group dance routines. The overall winner upon completion of the final dances is chosen by the professional jury members. All participants received a medal, designed by Dutch artist Dinie Besems.

There was no interval act this year, with footage of previous contest winners and an offstage interview with Agnès Letestu, winner of the contemporary dance prize in 1989, broadcast instead.

== Participants and results ==
=== Preliminary round ===
Broadcasters from seventeen countries took part in the preliminary round of the 2003 contest, of which ten qualified to the televised grand final. The following participants failed to qualify.

Country	Broadcaster	Dancer(s)	Dance	Choreographer
United Kingdom	BBC	Kate Lyons	The Girl	M. Baldwin
Belgium	RTBF	Sébastien Tassin	Coppélia	A. Saint-Léon
Cyprus	CyBC	Natalia Krekou	After	A. Hatjieftychiou
Slovenia	RTVSLO	Anže Škrube	Club Hoppin	D. Popovski
Armenia	ARMTV	Avetik Karapetyan	Rhythm of Spirit	H. Divanyan
Norway	NRK	Caroline Roca	Afraid of Beauty	P. Touzeau
Poland	TVP	Jakub Greda	Solo Hip-Hop	A. Grazul and R. Ziolkowski

=== Final ===
There were two prizes given this year: one for contemporary dance (awarded to Sweden) and one for classical ballet dance (awarded to Ukraine). A special "young jury" award was given as well by a group of young viewers that were in the audience, this went to contemporary runner-up Czech Republic.

==== Classical category ====
Country	Broadcaster	Dancer(s)	Dance	Choreographer	Points	Place
Ukraine	NTU	Jerlin Ndudi	Le Corsaire	M. Petipa	938	1
Estonia	ETV	Maria Seletskaja	Swan Lake	M. Petipa	800	3
Finland	Yle	Tiina Myllymäki	Paquita	Makarova and M. Petipa	745	5
Greece	ERT	Elenina Nicolaou	Paquita	M. Petipa	716	6
Romania	TVR	Ovidiu Matei Iancu	Swan Lake	M. Petipa	831	2
Switzerland	SRG SSR	Sarah-Jane Brodbeck	Don Quixote	M. Petipa	793	4

==== Contemporary category ====
Country	Broadcaster	Dancer(s)	Dance	Choreographer	Points	Place
Sweden	SVT	Kristina Oom and Sebastian Michanek	Light Beings	M. Ek	907	1
Czech Republic	ČT	Monika Hejduková and Viktor Konvalinka	The Twilight Of Innocence	Kodel and Vágnerová	856	2
Netherlands	NOS	Joeri Dubbe	Perfect Skin	E. Wubbe	781	3
Latvia	LTV	Linda Siliņa	La Primavera	I. Lapsiņa	777	4

== Jury members ==
The jury members consisted of the following:

- Russia – Vladimir Vasiliev
- Germany – Susanne Linke
- Italy – Paola Cantalupo
- Netherlands – Derrick Brown
- United States – Liz Imperio

== Broadcasting ==
26 national broadcasters in 23 countries transmitted the 2003 event. Albania, Croatia, Germany, Iceland, Puerto Rico, and Serbia and Montenegro all broadcast the contest in addition to the competing countries. Known details on the broadcasts in each country, including the specific broadcasting stations and commentators are shown in the tables below.

Broadcasters in participating countries
Country	Broadcaster(s)	Channel(s)	Commentator(s)	Ref(s)
Armenia	Armenia TV			
Belgium	RTBF	La Deux		
Cyprus	CyBC			
Czech Republic	ČT	ČT2 (Note: Delayed broadcast on 25 October)		
Estonia	ETV (Note: Deferred broadcast on 11 July at 22:30 EET)			
Finland	Yle	TV1		
Greece	ERT			
Latvia	LTV			
Netherlands	NOS	Nederland 3		
Norway	NRK	NRK1 (Note: Deferred broadcast on 13 August at 19:30 CEST)		
Poland	TVP	TVP2		
Romania	TVR	TVR 2		
Slovenia	RTVSLO			
Sweden	SVT	SVT1, SVT2, SVT Europa	Agneta Bolme Börjefors	
Switzerland	DRS	SF 1 (Note: Deferred broadcast on 6 July at 23:05 CEST)		
Switzerland	TSR			
Switzerland	TSI			
Ukraine	NTU	Pershyi	Yuri Stanishevsky	
United Kingdom	BBC	BBC Four (Note: Deferred broadcast on 12 July at 19:00 UTC)	Deborah Bull	

Broadcasters in non-participating countries
Country	Broadcaster(s)	Ref(s)
Albania	RTVSH	
Croatia	HRT	
Germany	3sat (Note: Deferred broadcast on 2 August at 11:15 CET)	
Iceland	RÚV	
Kosovo	RTK	
Puerto Rico		
Serbia and Montenegro	UJRT	

== See also ==
- Eurovision Song Contest 2003
- Junior Eurovision Song Contest 2003
