= Unni Bernhoft =

Norwegian actress and tobacco retailer

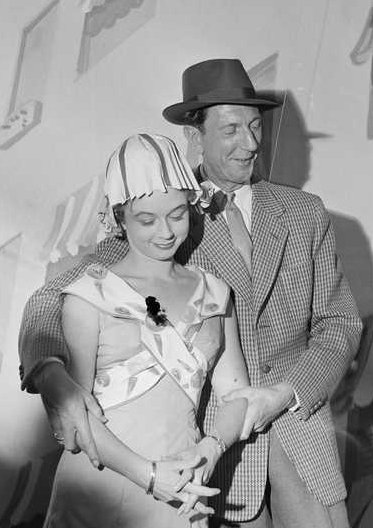
- Bernhoft and Leif Juster at the Edderkoppen Theatre in 1959
- Born: 4 March 1933 (age 93); Oslo, Norway
- Occupations: Actress; Merchant
- Spouse: Bjørn Sand
- Children: Jon Ola Sand
- Parent: Bias Bernhoft
- Relatives: Tobias Bernhoft (grandfather)

Unni Elisabeth Bernhoft (born 4 March 1933) is a Norwegian actress and tobacco retailer. Among her best known appearances is the role as bellhop in the comedy film Fjols til fjells. She is also known for her song recording "Lille Frøken Stang".

== Personal life ==
Bernhoft was born in Oslo on 4 March 1933. She is a daughter of singer and revue writer Bias Bernhoft and Margit Haug, and is a granddaughter of Tobias Bernhoft. She is married to actor Bjørn Sand, and is the mother of television producer and executive Jon Ola Sand.

== Career ==
Bernhoft made her stage debut at Chat Noir in 1953, in the revue Katten er løs. Her film appearances include Bedre enn sitt rykte (1955), Smuglere i smoking (1957), Fjols til fjells (1957), Støv på hjernen (1959), and Millionær for en aften (1960). In the comedy Fjols til fjells she played the character "Ruth Granberg" (bellhop), opposite Leif Juster as "Poppe". Until 2002 Fjols til fjells was the fourth-most-viewed Norwegian film of all time. Her best known song recording is probably "Lille Frøken Stang" from 1955. She gave voice to the character "Vips" (Red Fraggle) in the Norwegian dub of Fraggle Rock.
