= Christian August Anker (1896–1982) =

Businessperson

Christian August Anker (29 January 1896 – 1982) was a Norwegian businessperson in the paper industry.

He was born in Berg, Østfold as a son of Johan Anker (1871–1940) and Julie Jacobsen. He was a brother of Erik Anker, and a stepson of Nini Roll Anker. He was married several times, amongst others to Dagmar Juliana Diesen (1917–92), a daughter of Emil Diesen and a German mother.

He finished his secondary education in 1915. He studied at the technical college in Zurich from 1915 to 1918, and later he attended a commercial school in Lyon (1920). From 1920 to 1923 he managed a coffee plantation in British Kenya. A year later he was hired for a forestry job by Hunsfos Fabrikker (1924), then BY Boen Tresliperi in 1926. From 1928 to 1933 he was an engineer in the Paper Industry Research Institute, before becoming manager and chief executive officer of Risør Træmassefabrikker from 1934.

He was a board member of the Paper Industry Research Institute from 1934, and board member of the Federation of Norwegian Industries from 1937 to 1942.
