= Bias Bernhoft =

Norwegian singer and revue writer

- Born: Tobias Brodtkorb Bernhoft; 13 October 1902; Voss Municipality, Norway
- Died: 24 November 1986 (aged 84)
- Occupations: Singer; Revue writer Shop owner
- Children: Unni Bernhoft
- Parent: Tobias Bernhoft
- Relatives: Bjørn Sand (son-in-law); Jon Ola Sand (grandson)
- Awards: Leonard Statuette (1973)

Tobias Brodtkorb "Bias" Bernhoft (13 October 1902 – 24 November 1986) was a Norwegian singer and revue writer.

== Early and personal life ==
He was born at Voss Municipality, Norway, in 1902 to the Holmenkolbanen director Tobias Bernhoft (1869–1937) and his wife Marie Holmboe (1877–1974). He married Margit Haug (1908–98), a daughter of the hotel director Petter Haug (1875–1939) and Dorthea Olava Olsen (1878–1962). Bernhoft had two children with her, Unni Elisabeth Bernhoft (born on 4 March 1933) and Inger Marie Bernhoft (born on 29 January 1938). Unni Elisabeth Bernhoft married Bjørn Sand, and made her debut at Chat Noir in 1953.

== Career ==
Bernhoft made his debut in the revue "Hvisk det Høyt" (English: Whisper it Loud) at the theatre Casino in 1926 in Oslo. Two years later, he opened a tobacco shop at Majorstuen. In 1930, he made his debut as a gramophone singer, singing the song "En bølgesang i solnedgang/Don Juan" (English: A Wave Song in the Sunset/Don Juan). Until 1938, Bernhoft recorded more than 40 records for the Columbia Records.

From the 1930s, he was a central writer for the revue stages Chat Noir and Edderkoppen Theatre, where he wrote revue texts for actors such as Lalla Carlsen, Leif Juster and Kari Diesen. Among his songs are "Omatt og omatt" (English: Again and Again, performed by Elisabeth Granneman), and "Karl Johan og jeg", issued on the album Jeg har mitt hjerte i Oslo (English: I have my heart in Oslo), which became a radio hit in Norway in 1979.

Together with Bjørn Sand, Bernhoft wrote a famous monologue titled "Uteliggerne" (English: The Bums), which was performed by Kari Diesen. He was awarded the Leonard Statuette in 1973. He retired later in the 1970s, and died in November 1986.
