= Skotterud derailment =

2010 railway incident in Norway

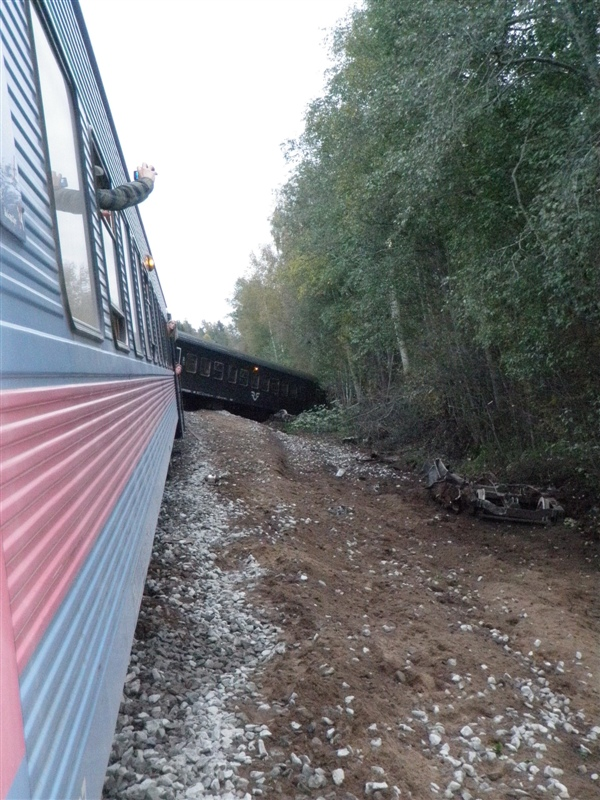
- The derailment site after the accident

Details
- Date: 1 October 2010
- Location: Skotterud
- Coordinates: 59°59′N 12°07′E
- Country: Norway
- Line: Kongsvinger Line
- Operator: SJ
- Incident type: Derailment
- Cause: Crack in a wheel of the first carriage

Statistics
- Trains: 1
- Passengers: 300
- Deaths: 0
- Injured: 40

The Skotterud derailment occurred on 1 October 2010, on the Kongsvinger Line at Skotterud, Eidskog Municipality, Norway. An InterCity train from Oslo, Norway traveling to Stockholm, Sweden derailed due to a cracked wheel. Forty people were injured, including former Eurovision Song Contest executive supervisor Jon Ola Sand. No one was killed in the derailment.

== Accident ==
Shortly after leaving Kongsvinger Station the train derailed near Skotterud at 17:40, with one carriage flipping over on its side and another running off the track and stopping in a ditch.

Passengers reported loud noises, sudden braking and a crash that some thought resulted from a collision with a vehicle. Most managed to get out of the wrecked carriages themselves and an emergency reception center was set up at the nearby town hall in Skotterud.
