= Finn Sejersted =

Norwegian businessman

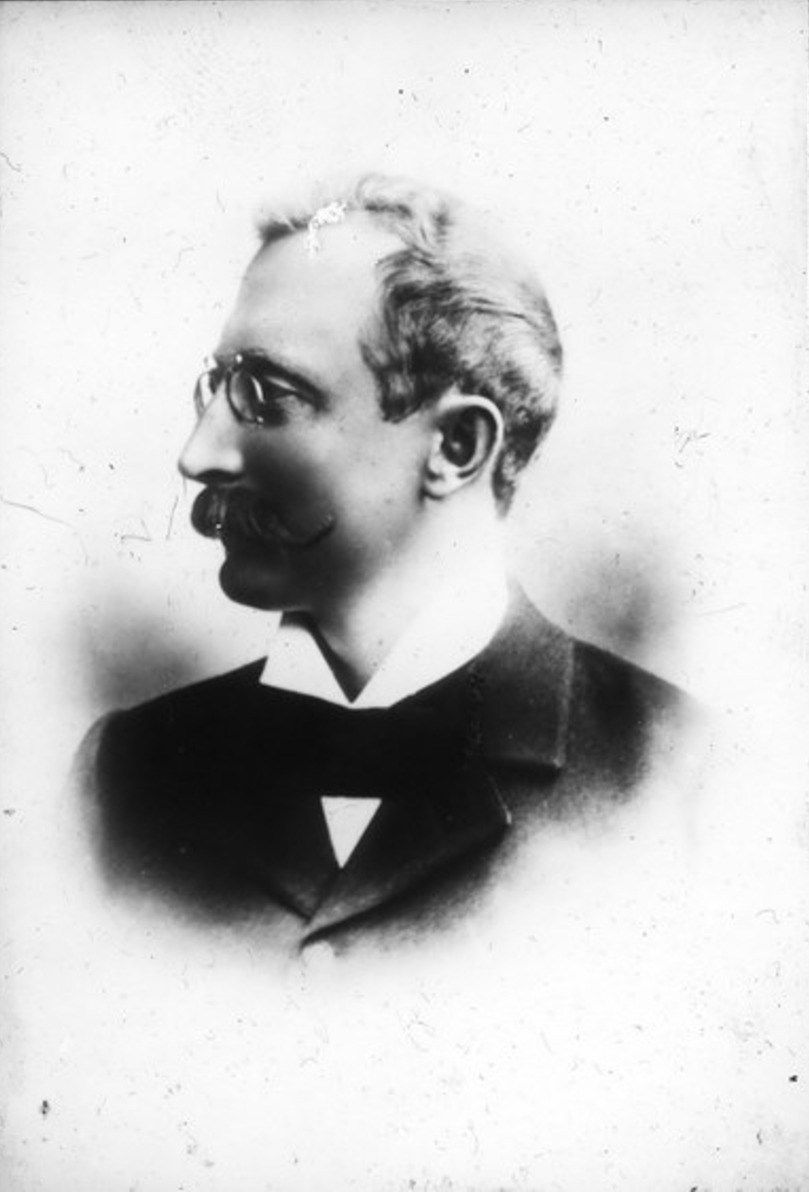
- Born: 3 August 1868

Finn Sejersted (3 August 1868 – 22 January 1914) was a Norwegian director and railway engineer.

He was born in Trondheim, Nord-Trøndelag, in 1868, and studied at Trondhjems tekniske Skole ("Trondheim School of Technology") between 1887 and 1890. After he finished studying, he was hired by the Norwegian State Railways, where he worked as an installation director of the Solør, Sætesdal and Gjøvik Lines.

In 1897, Sejersted became managing director of Holmenkolbanen, at an age of 29 years. He succeeded Albert Fenger-Krog, and was the acting director when Holmenkolbanen opened the Holmenkoll Line in 1898.

Following the 1912 Valkyrie plass tunnel collapse, Sejersted became depressed of the criticism he received, and died aged 46, on 22 January 1914. He was succeeded by Tobias Bernhoft.

Business positions
Preceded by Albert-Fenger Krog	Managing director of Holmenkolbanen; 1897–1914	Succeeded by Tobias Bernhoft
