= Hortens Avis =

Historic newspaper in Norway

Hortens Avis is a former Norwegian newspaper, based in Horten Municipality. It was established in 1874 as Jarlsbergeren, and assumed the name Hortens Avis in 1875. From 1880 Hortens Avis was an organ for the Liberal Party. The newspaper has also called itself Jarlsberg Tidende and Hortens Blad. Among its editors were later Commanding Admiral of Norway Henry Diesen. The newspaper ceased publication in 1926.
