= Rolf Sand =

Norwegian actor (1920–2018)

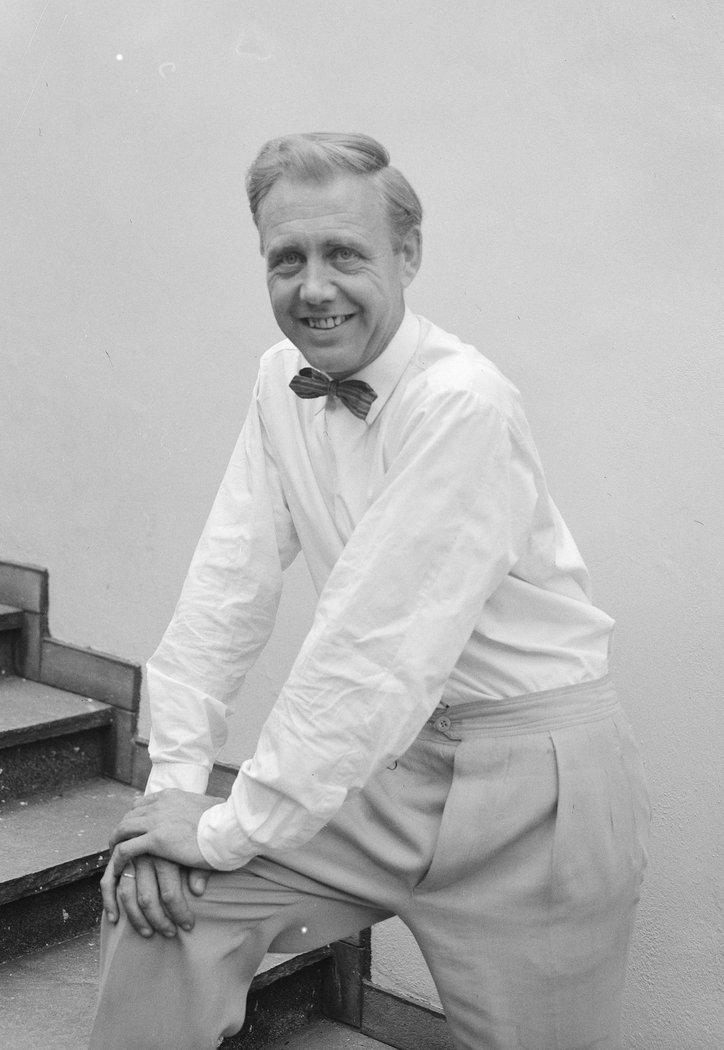

Rolf Sand (21 February 1920 – 20 May 2018) was a Norwegian actor. He was born in Kristiania, a half-brother of Bjørn Sand. He made his stage debut in 1949, in the title role in Holberg's comedy Den pantsatte bondedreng. From 1952 to 1954 he performed at the Trøndelag Theater, and then at the National Traveling Theater from 1954 to 1958. He worked at the Norwegian Theater from 1962 until his retirement in 1987. He played a large number of minor characters in Norwegian film productions. Sand died in May 2018 at the age of 98.
