= Andreas Diesen =

Norwegian television presenter

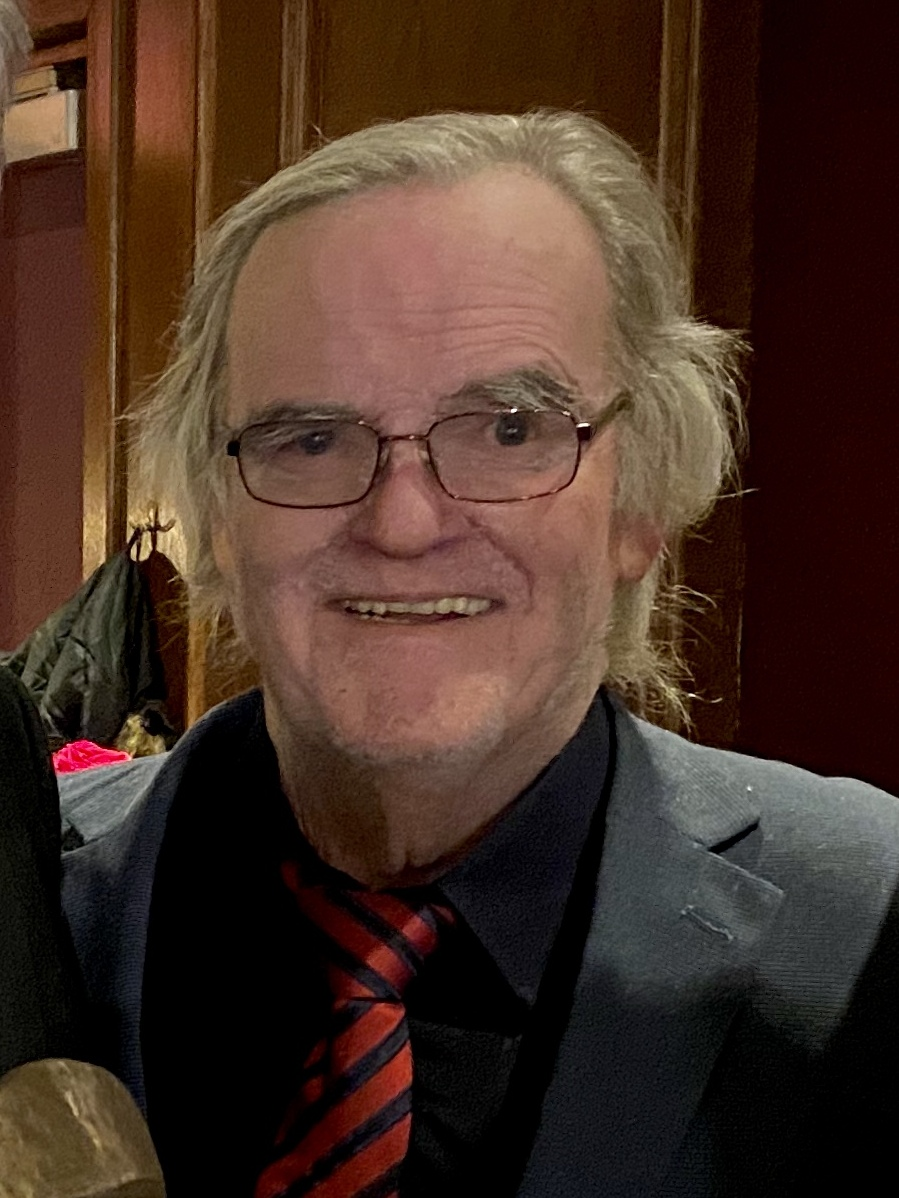
- Andreas Diesen, 2019
- Born: 20 November 1945 (age 80)
- Occupation: Journalist
- Parents: Ernst Diesen (father); Kari Diesen (mother)
- Relatives: Andreas Melchior Seip Diesen (grandfather); Harald Steen (grandfather); Signe Heide Steen (grandmother)
- Awards: Leonard Statuette (2005); King's Medal of Merit (2012)

Andreas Diesen (born 20 November 1945) is a Norwegian television presenter and revue historian.

In 2005 he was awarded the Leonard Statuette from the Norwegian Comedy Writers' Association. Having been assigned with NRK since 1965, he was awarded the King's Medal of Merit in 2012, for his contributions to entertainment in Norway.

Diesen was born in Oslo, a son of actors Ernst Diesen and Kari Diesen, and is a grandson of Andreas Melchior Seip Diesen, Harald Steen and Signe Heide Steen.

== Selected works ==
- Kari for åpen scene. Oslo: Gyldendal. 1982. ISBN 9788205140363. OCLC 22007062. Biography.
- Ikke lett å være tung : en lettlest bok i vektens tegn. Oslo: Gyldendal. 1983. ISBN 9788205147676. OCLC 17121565.
