= Det æ'kke te å tru =

- Directed by: Toralf Sandø
- Written by: Solvejg Eriksen, Toralf Sandø
- Starring: Leif Juster; Ernst Diesen
- Edited by: Olav Engebretsen
- Release date: 26 December 1942
- Running time: 86 minutes
- Country: Norway
- Language: Norwegian

Det æ'kke te å tru (English: It's Unbelievable) is a 1942 Norwegian drama film directed by Toralf Sandø, starring Leif Juster and Ernst Diesen. Two executives at a retail company both try to come up with the best idea for the autumn fair, and win the big prize.

== Cast ==
- Leif Juster as Bernt
- Ernst Diesen as Nils
- Erling Drangsholt as Aalberg
- Thorleif Reiss as Harald Hagen
- Eva Lunde as Unni Borg
- Tryggve Larssen as Hansen - inventor
- Guri Stormoen as Mrs Hansen
- Anne-Lise Wang as Vera
- Einar Vaage as Storm, director
- Ulf Selmer as Abel, grocer
- Erling Hanson as Wang, lawyer
- Jens Bolling as Olaf Borg
- Alfred Solaas as the Conference Speaker
- Finn Bernhoft as Pedersen
- Folkman Schaanning as the Barber Master
- Rolf Christensen as Olsen, auditor
- Sissel Thygesen as Ms Bull
- Margit Brataas as Gina, a dancer
