= Olav Braarud =

Norwegian businessman (1885–1969)

Olav Braarud (2 February 1885 – 4 April 1969) was a Norwegian director and engineer.

Born in Verdal Municipality, Nordre Trondhjems Amt, he travelled to Darmstadt, Germany, where he graduated as an engineer in 1910. In 1912, he became operational engineer of the company Holmenkolbanen, which owned and operated the Holmenkollen Line in Oslo, Norway. In 1934, Braarud was promoted to incorporated engineer of Holmenkolbanen. He was made responsible for the finishing of the Sognsvann and Røa Lines, which opened in 1934 and 1935, respectively. Following the death of Tobias Bernhoft in 1937, Braarud became the managing director of Holmenkolbanen. Even though the board of Holmenkolbanen was occupied by Nasjonal Samling and nazi military during World War II, Braarud remained managing director of the company during the war.

Edvard Heiberg succeeded him as managing director on 1 July 1953. For his work at Holmenkolbanen, Braarud was decorated as a Knight, First Class of the Royal Norwegian Order of St. Olav in 1952. From 1950 to 1958, he was a member of an expert committee which planned new metro lines connecting the Oslo city centre with the East End. He died in April 1969 and was buried in Ris, Oslo.

Business positions
Preceded by Tobias Bernhoft	Managing director of Holmenkolbanen; 1937–1953	Succeeded by Edvard Heiberg
