= Jon Ola Sand =

Norwegian television executive (born 1961)

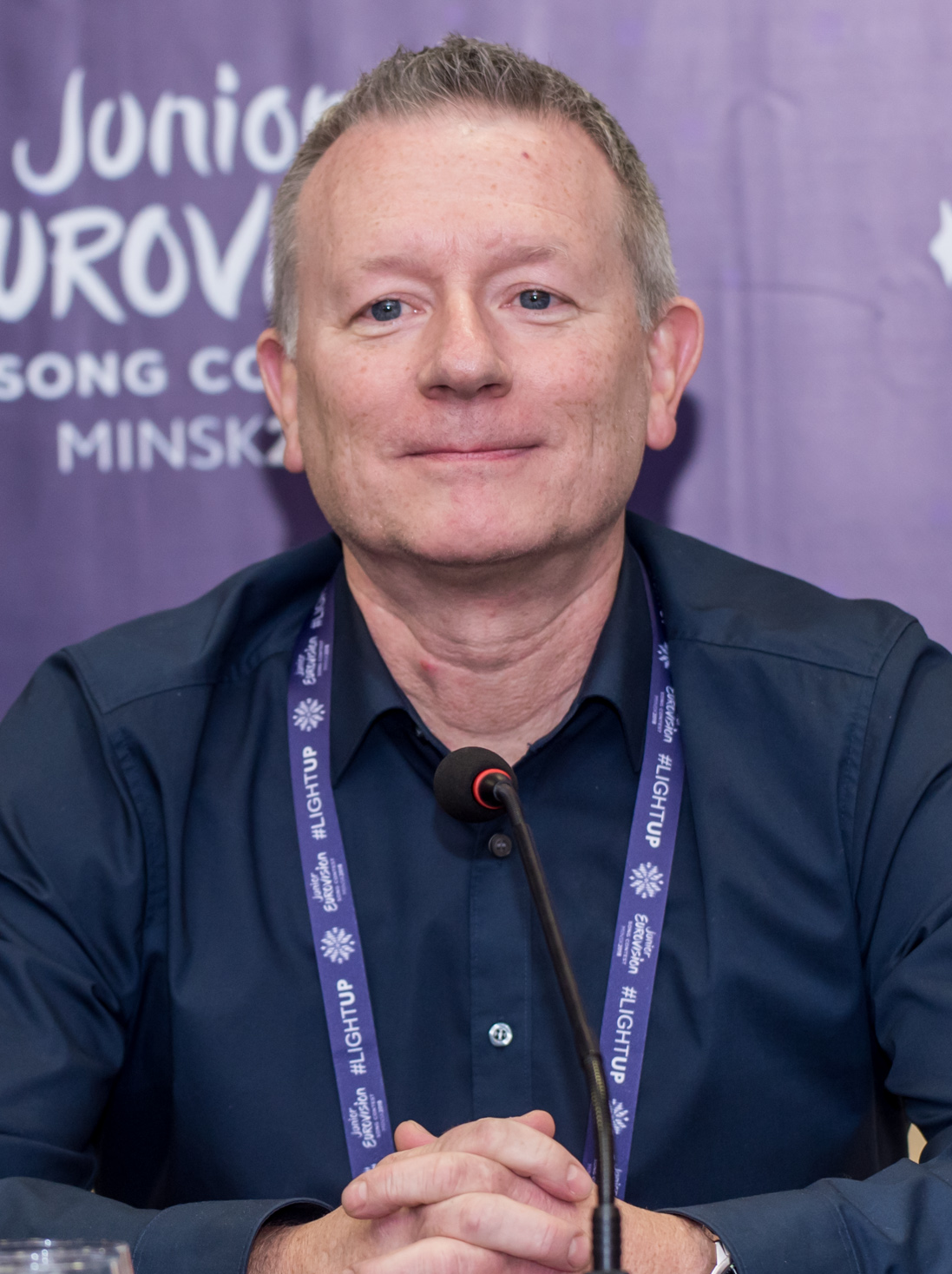
- Sand in Minsk, during a press conference for the Junior Eurovision Song Contest 2018
- Born: 21 December 1961 (age 64); Oslo, Norway
- Occupation: Television executive
- Years active: 1980–present
- Parents: Bjørn Sand (father); Unni Bernhoft (mother)
- Relatives: Bias Bernhoft (grandfather); Simen Sand (brother)

Executive supervisor of the Eurovision Song Contest
- In office 1 January 2011 – 16 May 2020
- Preceded by: Svante Stockselius
- Succeeded by: Martin Österdahl

Executive supervisor of the Junior Eurovision Song Contest
- In office 2 December 2015 – 16 May 2020
- Preceded by: Vladislav Yakovlev
- Succeeded by: Martin Österdahl

Head of live events at the European Broadcasting Union
- In office 2 December 2015 – 16 May 2020
- Preceded by: Office re-established
- Succeeded by: Office abolished

Jon Ola Sand (Norwegian: [ˈjuːn ˈûːlɑ ˈsɑnː]; born 21 December 1961) is a Norwegian television executive, best known for his role as the European Broadcasting Union's executive supervisor of the Eurovision Song Contest from 2011 to 2020.

== Early life ==
He is the son of revue writer and actor Bjørn Sand and actress Unni Bernhoft. He grew up at Vinderen in Oslo, and has a brother and a sister. His brother, Simen, is an actor and author.

Sand completed upper secondary school in 1980, graduating from the music track at Foss videregående skole in Oslo. As a teenager he played drums in local hard-rock band, Bronx, who released a single album titled Midnight Queen.

== Career ==
Sand appeared in a minor role in the 1980 film At dere tør!. In 1981 he started at NRK as a junior researcher/assistant on a music television programme, later progressing into production roles. He had a stint in the competing channel TV 2 from 1992 to 1996. Sand is a member of the International Academy of Television Arts and Sciences.

Television shows produced or directed by Sand include the Nobel Peace Prize Concert, the Amanda Award show and Melodi Grand Prix.

=== Eurovision Song Contest ===
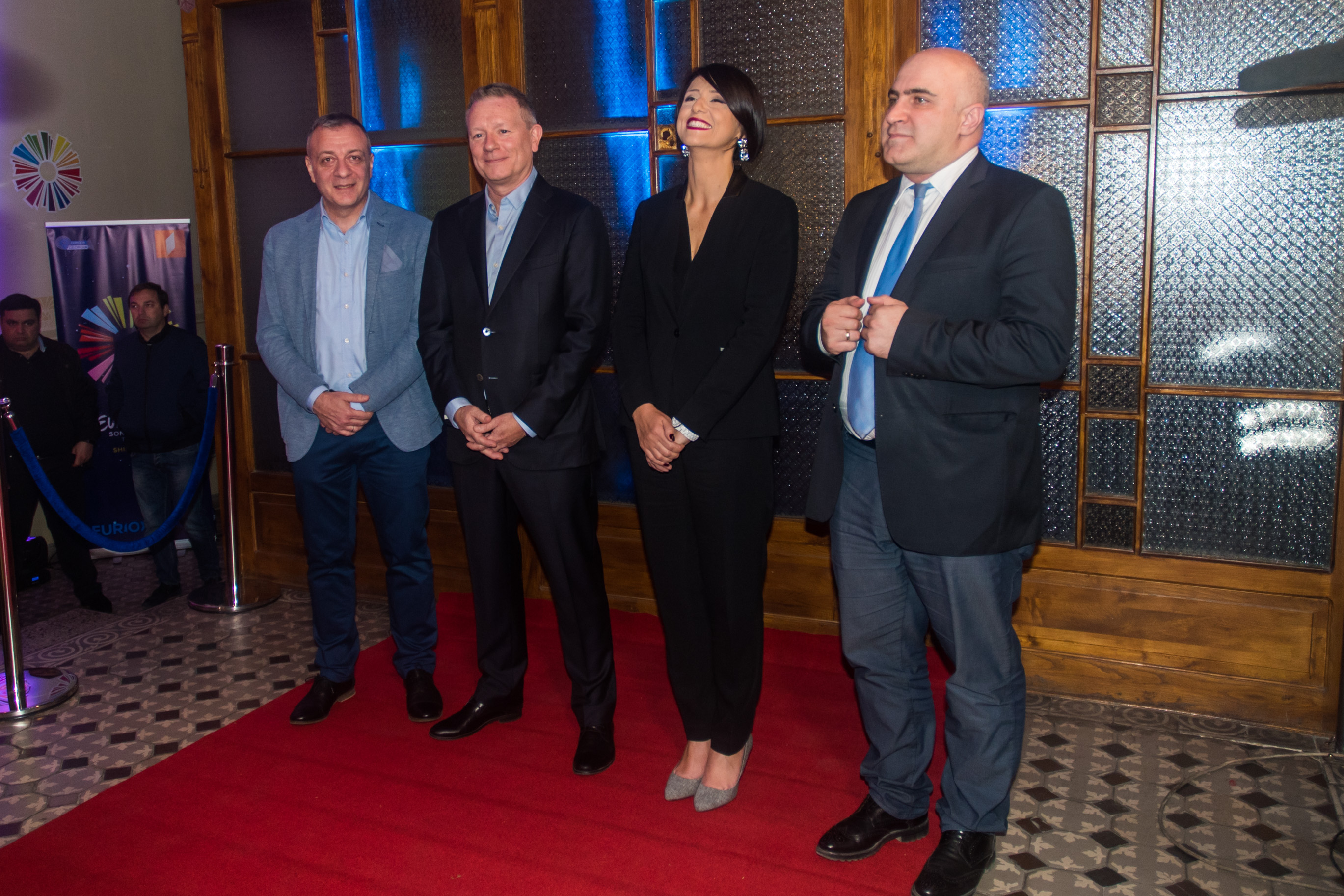
Sand (2nd left) on the red carpet at the opening ceremony for the Junior Eurovision Song Contest 2017.

From 1998 to 2005, he headed the Norwegian delegation at the Eurovision Song Contest. In 2010, Sand was appointed as the Executive Producer of the Eurovision Song Contest 2010, held in Oslo, Norway.

On 26 November 2010, Sand was appointed as the European Broadcasting Union's Executive Supervisor of the Eurovision Song Contest, after Svante Stockselius stepped down from the role; the new position began on 1 January 2011. Sand reportedly edged out 39 other applicants. As Executive Supervisor, Sand has the last call with regards to the production of the Eurovision Song Contest, with the ability to overrule the producers, and instruct. He is also responsible for the organization of the voting system of the contest. He made his debut as Executive Supervisor at the 2011 contest in Düsseldorf. He had been on leave from NRK since being appointed Executive Supervisor.

During live shows Sand regularly appeared from an EBU desk to authorise the voting sequence, using the on-screen cue “Take it away.” The EBU later referred to the line as his “iconic” catchphrase; official Eurovision media also described him as “the person to ask the presenters to start the voting and ‘take it away’.”

Ahead of the 2013 season, Sand and the EBU replaced the Song Contest's traditional draw with a producer-determined running order (retaining a draw only to determine “first half/second half”), a move presented by Sand as serving a “better television flow” and fairer pacing of the contest; the change applied to both Semi-Finals and the Grand Final. In response to recurrent concerns about vote-swapping and jury integrity, the EBU under Sand investigated manipulation claims after the 2013 contest and subsequently tightened jury rules for 2014 (mandatory independent observers at jury deliberations, increased transparency of individual rankings and rapid sanctions for breaches).

Sand also oversaw decisions that broadened the Contest’s reach. In November 2015 the EBU, with Sand as Executive Supervisor, invited Australia to return in 2016; he argued that the Contest could “evolve organically into a truly global event”. Under his tenure the Contest invested in digital growth, including the official app and a rapidly growing YouTube channel (awarded YouTube’s Gold Play Button in 2016).

In December 2015 the EBU announced that Junior Eurovision’s Executive Supervisor Vladislav Yakovlev had left following a departmental restructure. The EBU stated it had offered him a new role within its Live Events unit, but no agreement was reached; reporting at the time characterised the move as a dismissal. As part of the reorganisation Sand was given expanded responsibilities as the EBU re-established the office of Head of Live Events, last held by Sarah Yuen until 2005, which oversaw the Eurovision Song Contest and its sister competitions; he also took on direct Executive Supervisor duties for Junior Eurovision from the 2016 edition.

In 2016, Sand introduced the biggest on-air voting change since 1975: juries and televoters now each award a full set of 1–8, 10 and 12 points, with jury points announced first by spokespersons and all televote points revealed in a final suspense segment. This was framed as increasing both clarity and drama. The same year, the he and the EBU removed Romania (TVR) from the 2016 Contest and other EBU services due to CHF 16 million in unpaid debt; Sand called the decision “disappointing” but necessary and confirmed the show would proceed unaffected.

In 2017, Sand managed the Russia–Ukraine crisis when, host country, Ukraine, imposed a three-year entry ban on Russia’s artist Julia Samoylova from entering the country. Sand publicly expressed disappointment, proposed solutions (including a remote performance) and continued dialogue with authorities; Russia ultimately withdrew, and Ukraine was later fined for organizational issues around the event. In 2018, after Chinese broadcaster Mango TV censored LGBTQ content during Semi-Final 1, the EBU terminated its partnership for that year; Sand’s team cited core EBU values of universality and inclusivity in ending the deal immediately.

Sand also fronted host-city and governance matters. In 2018, he led inspections in Israel and publicly outlined hosting requirements before Tel Aviv 2019 was confirmed. In early 2019, following contractual disputes after Ukraine’s national selection, the EBU announced Ukraine’s withdrawal from the Contest. After Belarus’s jury was dismissed for rule breaches during Tel Aviv’s show week, an incorrect aggregated jury result was used live by mistake; Sand issued a corrigendum on 22 May 2019 confirming corrected points and placements (the winner and Top 4 were unchanged).

On 30 September 2019, Sand announced his intention to step down as Executive Supervisor of the Eurovision Song Contest after the 2020 edition, which would have been held in Rotterdam, the Netherlands (which was later cancelled due to the COVID-19 pandemic). He would also leave the Head of Live Events post which oversees the Junior Eurovision Song Contest, Eurovision Young Musicians and Eurovision Choir competitions. On 20 January 2020, it was announced that Swedish TV producer Martin Österdahl would succeed Sand as Executive Supervisor. On 17 May 2020, Sand was officially succeeded by Österdahl as Executive Supervisor of the Eurovision Song Contest after the one-off replacement show Eurovision: Europe Shine a Light was aired. He then returned to NRK, serving as project leader of its head office's relocation.

== Personal life ==
As of May 2010, Sand was in a cohabiting relationship with the Swedish choreographer Mattias Carlsson. While working for the Eurovision Song Contest, Sand lived in Geneva, Switzerland.

In October 2010, Sand was a passenger on the train that derailed at Skotterud in Hedmark, Norway. The incident resulted in some 40 people being injured.
