= Martin Green (producer) =

British events and television producer (born 1971)

Martin Green CBE
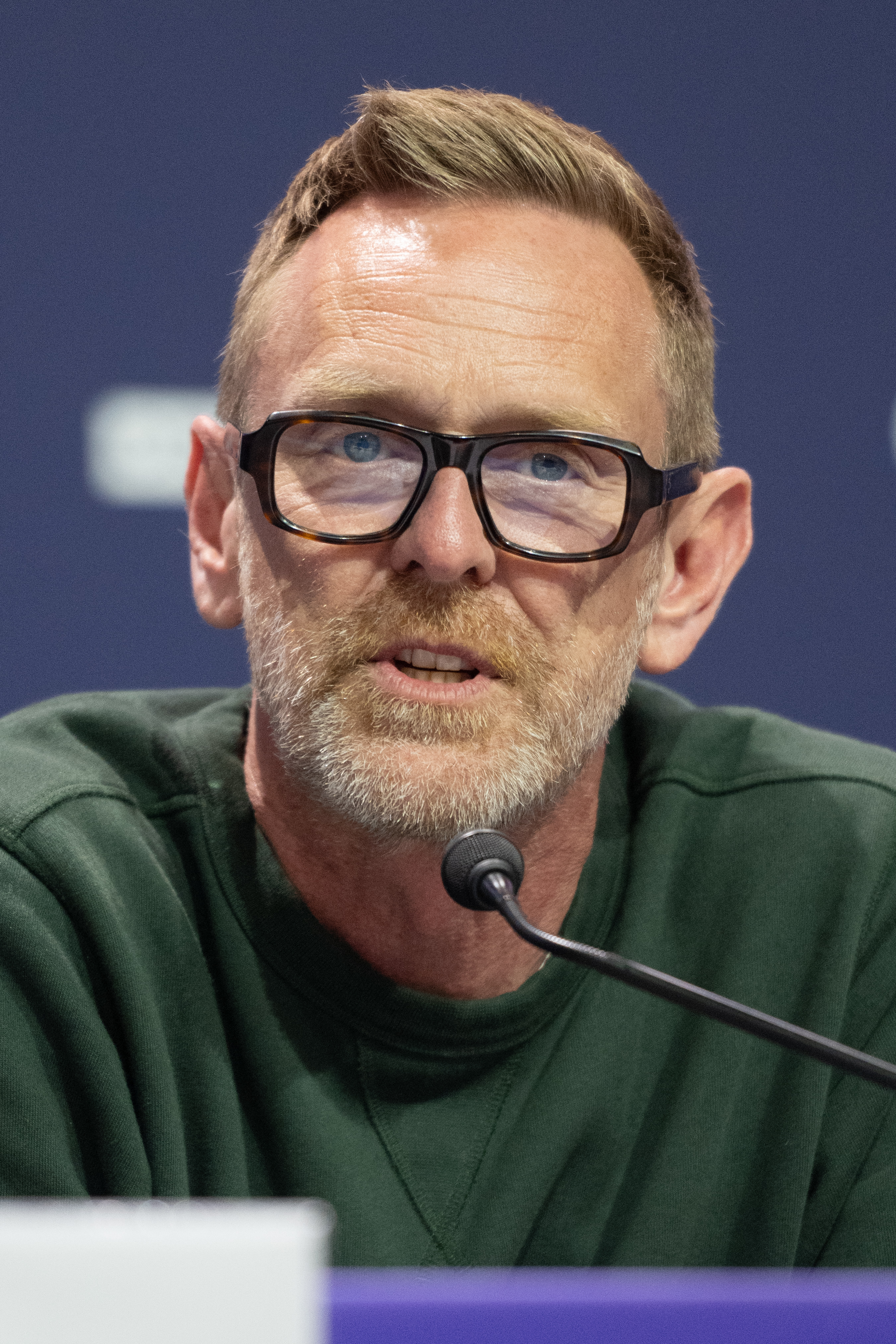
- Green in 2026
- Born: Martin Keith Green; 1971 (age 54–55); Essex, England
- Occupation: Television producer
- Employer: European Broadcasting Union

Director of the Eurovision Song Contest
- Incumbent
- Assumed office 1 November 2024
- Preceded by: Office established

Executive supervisor of the Eurovision Song Contest (interim)
- In office 1 July 2025 – 29 October 2025
- Preceded by: Martin Österdahl
- Succeeded by: Gert Kark (as EBU executive producer)

Executive supervisor of the Junior Eurovision Song Contest (interim)
- In office 1 July 2025 – 29 October 2025
- Preceded by: Martin Österdahl
- Succeeded by: Gert Kark (as EBU executive producer)

Martin Keith Green CBE (born September 1971) is a British live events producer and executive who has served as director of the Eurovision Song Contest since 2024. He has led the delivery of major UK cultural and sporting ceremonies, including as Head of Ceremonies for the 2012 Summer Olympics and Paralympics in London, Chief Executive and Director of Hull UK City of Culture 2017, Chief Creative Officer of the 2022 Commonwealth Games in Birmingham, and Managing Director of the Eurovision Song Contest 2023 for the BBC.

== Career ==
Green was Head of Ceremonies for the London 2012 Olympic and Paralympic Games, overseeing the torch relays and the opening and closing ceremonies, and recruiting Danny Boyle and other artistic directors.

On 31 July 2014, Green was appointed Chief Executive of Hull 2017, the company delivering the UK City of Culture programme, and led the year-long cultural celebration in 2017.

Green served as Chief Creative Officer of Unboxed: Creativity in the UK, a £120m UK-wide programme staged in 2022.

He was Chief Creative Officer of the Birmingham 2022 Commonwealth Games, leading the ceremonies and cultural programme.

Green was Chair of the Board of Trustees of Middle Child Theatre Company (Hull), stepping down in 2023, and in June 2025 was appointed Chair of the Board of Trustees at Ikon Gallery (Birmingham). He is a Cultural Fellow at King’s College London and was appointed Visiting Professor of Global Events, Culture and Entertainment at Manchester Metropolitan University effective 1 July 2025.

=== Eurovision Song Contest ===
In 2023, Green acted as the BBC's managing director for that year's Eurovision Song Contest in Liverpool, overseeing delivery of the event and branding. The production team subsequently won the 2024 BAFTA Television Award for Best Live Event Coverage.

In February 2024, Green joined TAIT as their Vice President of Global Live Events, though he left the position nine months later to return to the Eurovision Song Contest as its first director, a new role assuming some of the responsibilities of the executive supervisor, alongside new duties overseeing the event as a whole.

Following some controversies of the Eurovision Song Contest 2025, on 23 May 2025, he published an open letter to the Eurovision community addressing these concerns. On 27 June 2025, the EBU confirmed that, following Martin Österdahl's departure as the contest's executive supervisor, Green would assume his duties on an interim basis while continuing as director.

On 18 August 2025, Green oversaw the release of a revamped version of the generic Eurovision Song Contest logo for the 2026 contest and beyond.

In May 2026, Green sparked controversy by stating in interviews that Russia theoretically could return to the competition, even while its war with Ukraine continued. Green clarified that Russia's exclusion in 2022 was due to the lack of independence of its state broadcasters, VGTRK and Channel One from the Russian government, rather than the invasion itself, and that any return would depend on compliance with EBU rules. The remarks drew criticism from European broadcasters, politicians, and the public. Spain's RTVE condemned Green's statements as an “insult to European values” and warned they would “destroy the image of the contest” and hinder Spain's potential return. British MPs, including Liberal Democrat Tom Gordon, described the comments as “moral cowardice” and an “appalling betrayal of Ukraine,” demanding assurances that Russia would not be readmitted while the war continued. Green’s comments also reignited accusations of double standards, as Russia had been excluded from the contest due to its invasion of Ukraine while Israel has been allowed to compete despite its military actions in the Gaza war; critics argued that this undermined Eurovision's claim to political neutrality and its stated values of peace and unity. Green later clarified that there were no active plans or discussions for Russia to return the contest. On 4 June 2026, it was raised in the UK's Parliament in the form of an Urgent Question from Tom Gordon MP to the Secretary of State.

== Honours ==
Green was appointed Commander of the Order of the British Empire (CBE) in the 2018 New Year Honours for services to the arts in Hull during City of Culture 2017. He also received an honorary doctorate from the University of Hull in 2018.
