= Signe Heide Steen =

Norwegian actress

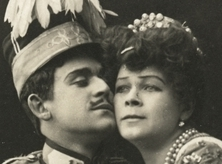
- Signe Heide Steen and her husband at the Central Theater in 1907, performing in The Merry Widow
- Born: May 17, 1881; Holmestrand, Norway
- Died: October 18, 1959 (aged 78); Oslo, Norway
- Resting place: Vestre Gravlund
- Occupation: Actress
- Spouse: Harald Steen
- Children: Randi Heide Steen, Harald Heide Steen, Kari Diesen
- Relatives: Harald Heide, Sigrid Ovidia Heide

Signe Heide Steen (May 17, 1881 – October 18, 1959) was a Norwegian actress.

== Family ==
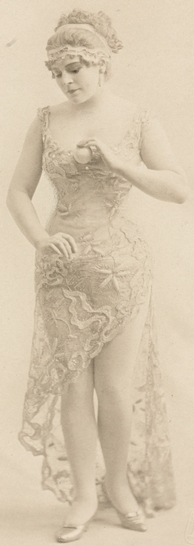
Signe Heide Steen circa 1910

Signe Heide Steen was born in Holmestrand, Norway, one of twelve children of the violin maker Johan Albert Heide (1848–1925) and Julie Hovelsen (1855–1906). Her older brother Harald Heide was a violinist and composer, and at the age of twelve Signe played the violin at local events.

After growing up in Holmestrand and Fredrikstad, she appeared as an extra for a production of Leo Tolstoy's The Power of Darkness at the Akersgaden Theater, and for a while she studied under Thora Hansson. On August 2, 1903, she made her debut at the Central Theater in the play Thummelumsen by the Danish writer Gustav Wied. After two years, she was engaged for one year at the National Theater in Bergen before she started at the National Theater in Oslo, where, while playing Valencienne, she met her husband Harald Steen (1886–1941), who was playing Count Camille de Rosillon in the first performance of The Merry Widow. Apart from 1908 to 1911, when they were again at the Central Theater, they were engaged with the National Theater in Oslo, from which Heide Steen terminated her engagement in 1918.

Afterward, she performed on the capital's revue stages at venues such as Chat Noir, where she celebrated her 40th birthday as an artist, and she also appeared in revues by Ernst Rolf at the Casino theater. Heide Steen also recorded gramophone records.

Signe Heide Steen and Harald Steen were the parents of Randi Heide Steen, Harald Heide Steen, and Kari Diesen.

== Filmography ==
- 1920: Kaksen på Øverland as Ingerid, Aasmund's wife
- 1924: Til sæters as Gunhild
- 1928: Cafe X as Mrs. Hansen
- 1936: Norge for folket
- 1949: Death Is a Caress as Martha, Sonja's maid
