= Svante Stockselius =

Swedish journalist (born 1955)

- Born: Stig Svante Stockselius; 31 December 1955 (age 70); Hudiksvall, Sweden
- Occupations: Television executive, journalist
- Spouse: Kajsa Glansén
- Children: 2

Executive supervisor of the Eurovision Song Contest
- In office 4 June 2003 – 31 December 2010
- Preceded by: Christine Marchal-Ortiz; Sarah Yuen (acting)
- Succeeded by: Jon Ola Sand

Executive supervisor of the Junior Eurovision Song Contest
- In office 4 June 2003 – 31 December 2010
- Succeeded by: Sietse Bakker

Stig Svante Stockselius (Swedish: [ˈsvânːtɛ stɔkˈsěːlɪɵs]; born 31 December 1955) is a Swedish journalist and television executive. He was the executive supervisor of the Eurovision Song Contest from 2004 to 2010 and the Junior Eurovision Song Contest from 2003 to 2010.

== Early life and career ==
Svante Stockselius grew up in Ockelbo, a small town in central Sweden. He started his career as a journalist. For 16 years, he worked for the Stockholm-based evening newspaper Expressen.

As head of the entertainment division of the Swedish public service television company Sveriges Television from the late 1990s, he worked for the Eurovision Song Contest 2000, held in Stockholm. He was also the architect of a major revamp of the Swedish ESC qualification competition, Melodifestivalen, in 2002, introducing four semi-finals and a Second Chance round preceding the finals. That same year, he went on to work for the commercial Swedish television channel TV4.

After Estonia's ESC victory in 2001, Stockselius was asked by the Estonian television channel ETV to take part in the preparations for the 2002 event. In 2003 he was offered the job as executive supervisor for the Eurovision Song Contest, a position he would hold until 30 August 2010, when it was announced that he would be resigning after the Junior Eurovision Song Contest 2010 to "give others the opportunity to take the event to the next level". In November 2010, Norwegian television executive Jon Ola Sand was appointed his successor in the role.
