= Tobias Bernhoft =

Norwegian businessman and engineer (1869–1936)

Tobias Brodtkorp Bernhoft (5 December 1869 – 20 August 1936) was a Norwegian engineer and director.

He was born on 5 December 1869 to Tobias Bernhoft senior (1841-1872) and his wife Thora (1848-1910) at Strinda Municipality. He married Marie Holmboe on 30 September 1896, with whom he had four children. Among them was the famous singer Bias Bernhoft.

Bernhoft studied at Kristiania tekniske skole ("Kristiania School of Technics") from 1889 to 1891. In the same year as he left the school, Bernhoft was hired by the Norwegian State Railways. He became the engineer of the constructions of the Gjøvik, Bergen, Roa-Hønefoss, Rauma and Solør Lines. In 1911, Bernhoft was appointed chief engineer of the Dovre Line. Bernhoft became the managing director of Holmenkolbanen in 1914, succeeding Finn Sejersted.

Tobias Bernhoft was admitted into the exclusive skiing-based social club SK Ull in 1889. He died on 20 August 1936, aged 68. After Bernhoft's death, Olav Braarud became managing director.

Business positions
Preceded by Finn Sejersted	Managing director of Holmenkolbanen; 1914–1934	Succeeded by Olav Braarud
