= Paper and Fibre Research Institute =

Norwegian research institute

The Paper and Fibre Research Institute (PFI) (Norwegian: Papir- og fiberinstituttet AS (PFI)) is a centre of expertise for wood fibres, pulp and paper, new biobased materials and sustainable biorefining.

PFI was established in Kristiania in 1923 as the Norwegian Pulp and Paper Research Institute. PFI moved to Trondheim in 1997/98, and established a close cooperation with the Department of Chemical Engineering at the Norwegian University of Science and Technology. In 2004 PFI changed name to the Paper and Fibre Research Institute and became a subsidiary of Innventia in Stockholm, Sweden.
