= Martin Österdahl =

Swedish author and television producer (born 1973)

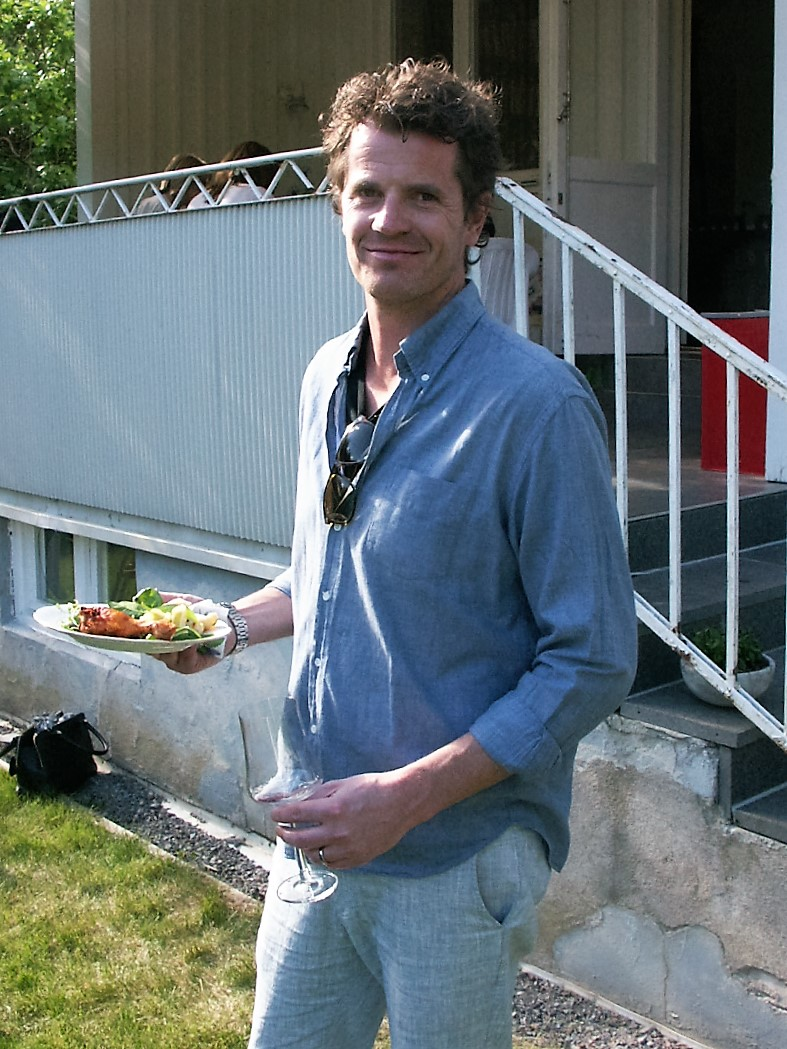
- Born: Erik Martin Österdahl; 12 October 1973 (age 52); Stockholm, Sweden
- Education: Uppsala University
- Occupations: Television producer, author
- Father: Marcus Österdahl

Executive supervisor of the Eurovision Song Contest
- In office 17 May 2020 – 30 June 2025
- Preceded by: Jon Ola Sand
- Succeeded by: Office abolished (de facto Martin Green)

Executive supervisor of the Junior Eurovision Song Contest
- In office 17 May 2020 – 30 June 2025
- Preceded by: Jon Ola Sand
- Succeeded by: Office abolished (de facto Martin Green)

Erik Martin Österdahl (pronounced [ˈêːrɪk ˈmǎʈːɪn ˈœ̂sːtɛˌɖɑːl]; born 12 October 1973) is a Swedish television producer and author. From 2008 to 2014, he worked on broadcasts of Mästarnas mästare, Allt för Sverige and Skavlan for SVT. His first book, Be inte om nåd (Ask no mercy), was published in 2016. He was the European Broadcasting Union's executive supervisor of the Eurovision Song Contest and Junior Eurovision Song Contest from May 2020 to June 2025.

== Early life ==
Österdahl grew up between Stockholm and London in a music-industry household; his father, the musician and producer Marcus Österdahl, ran recording studios in Sweden and the UK, while his mother worked in music publishing. He attended Adolf Fredrik's Music School in Stockholm and toured with the school’s choir, experiences that sparked an early interest in Eastern Europe.

He studied economics, Russian and East European studies at Uppsala University (1992–1996), spending a term in Saint Petersburg in 1996, where he wrote a thesis on the emerging Russian telecom sector.

== Career ==
After university, Österdahl entered the media industry via Modern Times Group's "Luma" trainee programme and later worked in a variety of MTG roles including the music trade magazine Topp 40, youth channel ZTV and TV3. He was also involved in launching the free daily newspaper Metro in the Netherlands and worked on MTG/TV-shop projects in Russia during the 1990s. Beyond broadcasting, he also worked with internet and venture projects around the turn of the millennium and was, for a period, programme head at the Stockholm amusement park Gröna Lund before moving to public service television.

Österdahl joined Sveriges Television (SVT) in 2005. He became commissioning editor for entertainment, sports and events, and in 2012 was named programme director (Allmän-TV), taking office in September 2013.

As commissioner and later programme director, he helped bring several high-profile formats to SVT's schedules including Mästarnas mästare, Allt för Sverige, Skavlan and Vinterstudion. In addition to entertainment formats, he oversaw major live broadcasts including the Nobel Prize Ceremony and the 2010 royal wedding of Crown Princess Victoria and Daniel Westling. Österdahl left his role as programme director at the end of 2014.

=== Eurovision Song Contest ===
Österdahl served as project leader and executive producer for, Sweden's Eurovision Song Contest national selection programme, Melodifestivalen in 2007 and 2008. Following this, he was appointed executive producer for the Eurovision Song Contest 2013 in Malmö and, later, the 2016 contest in Stockholm (the latter alongside Johan Bernhagen). In November 2013, the Swedish Project Academy named Österdahl Project Manager of the Year for his leadership of Eurovision 2013, citing tight deadlines, budget discipline and long-term impact on later host countries.

From 2012 to 2018, Österdahl sat on the Eurovision Song Contest Reference Group, the contest's governing board.

In January 2020, it was announced by the European Broadcasting Union (EBU) that Österdahl would succeed Jon Ola Sand as the executive supervisor of the Eurovision Song Contest after the final of the 2020 contest, which would have taken place in Rotterdam in May 2020. However, the 2020 contest was cancelled due to the COVID-19 pandemic; Österdahl later succeeded Sand as executive supervisor after the one-off replacement show, Eurovision: Europe Shine a Light was aired.

As executive supervisor, Österdahl had the last call with regard to the production of the Eurovision Song Contest, with the ability to over-rule the producers, and instruct. He was also responsible for the organisation of the voting system of the contest. He made his debut the role at the Junior Eurovision Song Contest 2020 in Warsaw, and later at the Eurovision Song Contest 2021 in Rotterdam. During his first years in the role, adaptations of the Eurovision format were announced for other continents, with the first such adaptation, American Song Contest, debuting in 2022.

Österdahl led the Eurovision Song Contest through several high-profile compliance decisions. In March 2021, Belarus was disqualified from the contest after submitting two non-compliant entries, and in May–July 2021 the EBU moved to suspend the Belarusian member broadcaster BTRC (later confirmed as an indefinite suspension). In the days leading up to Russia’s exclusion in February 2022, Österdahl and the EBU faced criticism for initially stating that Russia would be allowed to compete despite the invasion of Ukraine. Broadcasters from Ukraine and several Nordic countries publicly urged the EBU to suspend Russia, and Österdahl was questioned in media about defending the country’s continued participation. Commentators noted that the EBU’s reversal, announced on 25 February, came only after growing pressure from member broadcasters and public opinion.

After the 2022 contest, the EBU also annulled and replaced the jury votes of six countries due to irregular voting patterns. As a result, from 2023 the contest’s voting was altered: semi-final qualifiers were decided by televote only and a global Rest of the World online vote was introduced. In November 2023, Österdahl announced that the long-running annual slogans would be replaced with a permanent tagline, "United by Music".

==== Events leading to resignation ====
As executive supervisor, Österdahl was the "public face" of the contest. Following on from Sand using the catchphrase "Take it away" during the results segment when confirming that the voting data had been verified and the hosts could proceed, he introduced his own phrase, "You're good to go". The line was further recognised by 2024, when Sarah Dawn Finer, in her recurring role as the character Lynda Woodruff, performed a comedic musical tribute titled "You're Good to Go" during the final; the number was later released as a single. However, when Österdahl came to deliver the line in Malmö, he was subject to significant booing from the audience due to the controversies that had embroiled that year's contest, including both the participation of Israel and the disqualification of the Dutch entrant Joost Klein earlier that day. When he delivered the Dutch jury votes himself, (Note: Following the disqualification of the Dutch entry from the final, the Dutch spokesperson Nikkie de Jager withdrew from her role, and Dutch television chose not to replace her with a different spokesperson. Therefore, Österdahl announced the Dutch points instead.) he received further booing from the audience.

Following the 2024 contest, the EBU commissioned an independent review and announced governance and safeguarding changes for future editions; which saw the appointment of Martin Green as director of the contest, a new role which took much of Österdahl's responsibilities. At the 2025 contest, Österdahl's on-air role was reduced, with his catchphrase delivered by the show's presenters instead.

On 27 June 2025, the EBU announced that Österdahl would step down as executive supervisor, ahead of the Junior Eurovision Song Contest 2025 and the Eurovision Song Contest 2026. Due to the sudden nature of the resignation, Green assumed Österdahl's duties on an interim basis. The executive supervisor role was later abolished and replaced by the "EBU executive producer" role, with Gert Kark appointed to the post in October.

=== Author ===
Österdahl made his literary debut in 2016 with the thriller Be inte om nåd (Ask No Mercy), the first instalment in the Max Anger series. The books follow Swedish intelligence officer Max Anger, a former special forces soldier, and are largely set in Russia and the Baltic states, drawing on Österdahl's background in Russian and Eastern European studies. The first novel takes place in Saint Petersburg in the mid-1990s, while the sequel Tio svenskar måste dö (2017) spans Sweden, the Baltic region and Russia. Critics noted the series' Cold War echoes and depictions of post-Soviet criminal and political networks.

The novels were translated into several languages and optioned for television by Nice Drama and Pinewood Studios. A TV adaptation, Max Anger – With One Eye Open, premiered on Viaplay in 2021.

In addition to the Max Anger novels, Österdahl has published stand-alone novels including the Israeli-set thriller Järnänglar (Iron Angels, 2019) as well as Parmiddagen (The Couple Dinner, 2022). He also penned the non-fiction book All business is show business: Spelregler för den kreativa eran (2018).

== Bibliography ==
- 2016 – Be inte om nåd ("Ask no mercy"; ISBN 9789175036663)
- 2017 – Tio svenskar måste dö ("Ten Swedes must die"; ISBN 9789137147956)
- 2018 – All business is show business: Spelregler för den kreativa eran (ISBN 9789188743176)
- 2019 – Järnänglar ("Iron angels"; ISBN 9789137147987)
- 2022 – Parmiddagen ("Couple dinner"; ISBN 9789189393226)
