= Kari Diesen =

Norwegian singer and revue actress

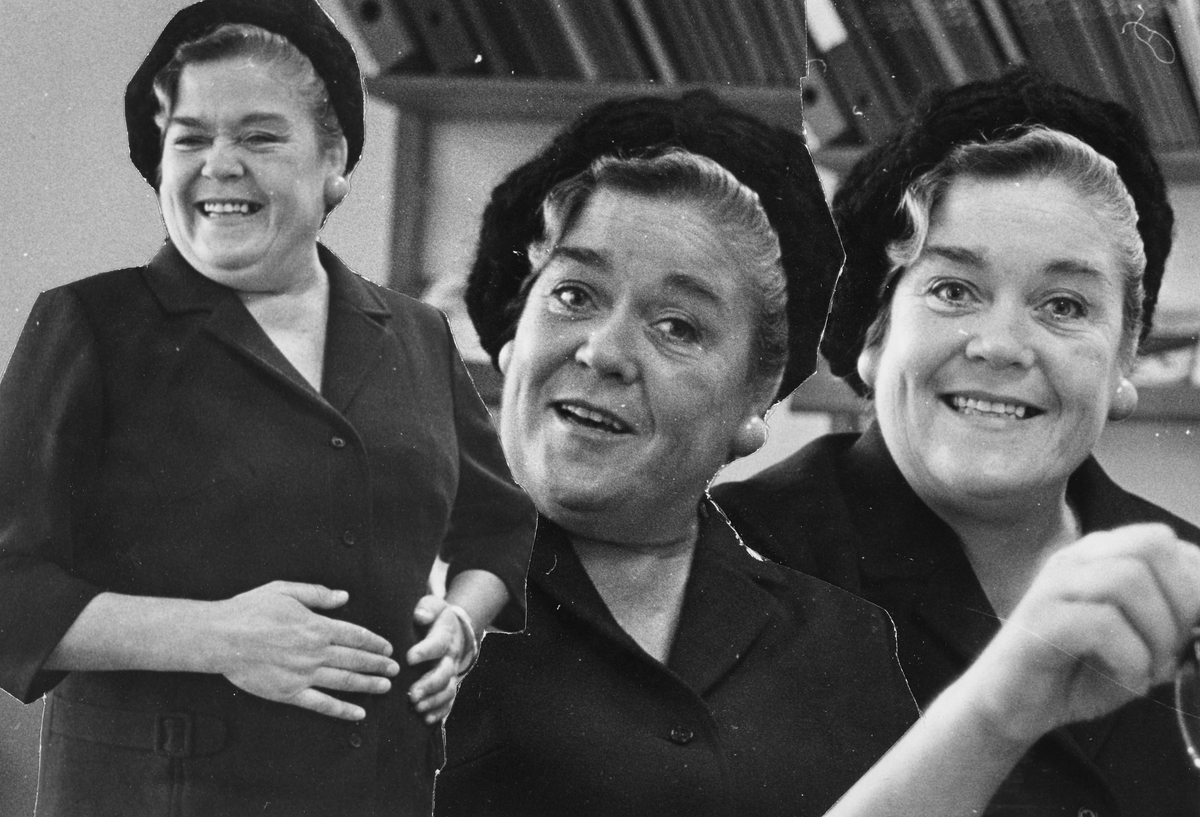
- Diesen in 1960
- Born: Kari Heide-Steen; 24 June 1914; Kristiania, Norway
- Died: 18 March 1987 (aged 72)
- Occupations: singer and revue actress
- Spouse: Ernst Diesen
- Children: Andreas Diesen
- Relatives: Harald Heide Steen (brother); Randi Heide Steen (sister); Harald Heide-Steen Jr. (nephew); Anne Marit Jacobsen (niece); Andreas Melchior Seip Diesen (father-in-law)
- Awards: Leonard Statuette (1971); Spellemannprisen Honorary Award (1980)

Kari Diesen (née Heide-Steen; 24 June 1914 – 18 March 1987) was a Norwegian singer and revue actress. She worked for the revue theatre Chat Noir from 1937 to 1953, and for the Edderkoppen Theatre from 1954 to 1959. She participated in 24 films between 1941 and 1985. Among her best known song recordings is her version of "Hovedøen".

== Personal life ==
Kari Heide-Steen was born in Kristiania (now Oslo), Norway as the daughter of Harald Steen (1886–1941) and Signe Heide Steen (1881–1959). She was sister of actor Harald Heide Steen, and aunt of actor Harald Heide-Steen Jr. She was sister of opera singer Randi Heide Steen and thus aunt of Randi's daughter actress Anne Marit Jacobsen.

She was married to actor and theatre director Ernst Diesen (1914–70), and was the mother of NRK writer and director Andreas Diesen. Her father-in-law was Andreas Melchior Seip Diesen, city physician of Kristiania.

== Career ==
After a career as a young ballerina for Ernst Rolf, she was engaged by Victor Bernau to his revue in the spring of 1930, where she performed the song "Det er forbudt for barn under 16 år". Her breakthrough came in the 1935 revue Hela'n går at Scala Theatre. From 1937 to 1953 she worked at Chat Noir, and from 1954 to 1959 at the Edderkoppen Theatre. She was later freelance artist, with frequent assignments for radio and television. Among her song performances are "Tykk og dum og deilig" and "Halvveis", and among her monologues are "Mannfolk" and "Uteliggerne" written by Bias Bernhoft and Bjørn Sand.

Her record debut came in 1938 when she sang two duets with Jens Book-Jenssen, "Oh – Mama – 6/8" and "En bitteliten pike i et stort hotell". Her performance of the song "Hovedøen" from 1957 became very popular and sold more than 50,000 records.

Her first film role was in Kaksen på Øverland when she was six years old. She participated in 24 films between 1941 and 1985, mostly playing minor characters. Her breakthrough in a leading film role was in the comedy Støv på hjernen from 1959, and she also played in the sequels Sønner av Norge from 1961 and Sønner av Norge kjøper bil from 1962. She played minor roles in Himmel og helvete from 1969 and in Ice Age from 1975. Several of her minor film characters were "as herself", as she was a distinct celebrity in her own right.

She was awarded the Leonard Statuette in 1971. After her husband's death in 1970 she retired from public life. Her comeback in a television show in 1980, celebrating Leif Juster, led to renewed popularity and the subsequent recording of the album Det hender så mangt–, and she received the Spellemannprisen Honorary Award.
