= Christine Marchal-Ortiz =

French television executive (born 1963)

- Born: 1 September 1963 (age 63); France
- Education: Boston University
- Occupation: Television executive

Executive supervisor of the Eurovision Song Contest
- In office 4 September 1995 – 27 November 2002
- Preceded by: Christian Clausen
- Succeeded by: Sarah Yuen (acting); Svante Stockselius

Christine Marchal-Ortiz (born 1 September 1963) is a French television executive who served as the European Broadcasting Union's Executive Supervisor of the Eurovision Song Contest for six contests between 1996 and 2002.

During her tenure, she oversaw significant changes to the contest's rules and presentation, including the introduction of televoting, the discontinuation of the live orchestra, relaxation of language rules, and early steps in official marketing such as the launch of the official CD.

== Early life ==
Marchal-Ortiz studied for a Master of Business Administration at the NEOMA Business School in Rouen from 1983, before specialising in a Master of Broadcast Management at Boston University until 1989.

== Career ==
Originally from France, Marchal-Ortiz worked for TF1, joining in 1989, initially as a researcher before rising to their mission manager. In September 1995, she was appointed the EBU's Executive Supervisor of the Eurovision Sonng Contest (also referred to on-air as the contest "scrutineer"). Marchal-Ortiz duties included the day-to-day supervision of the live event and liaising with host broadcasters as well as the long-term development of the contest's rules and format.

Marchal-Ortiz first oversaw the contest in 1996 in Oslo, and subsequently in 1998 (Birmingham), 1999 (Jerusalem), 2000 (Stockholm), 2001 (Copenhagen) and 2002 (Tallinn). While she did also oversee the 1997 contest in Dublin, she did not appear on-air that night, with the live broadcast crediting Marie-Claire Vionnet as scrutineer, deputising for Marchal-Ortiz.

Key developments implemented or advanced during her period included the piloting and rolling out televoting; ending the use of the live orchestra at the contest; relaxation of the language rule; early steps in contest marketing, including the launch of the official compilation CD.

At her first contest, in 1996, Marchal-Ortiz was confronted with a record number of would-be participants which led her to trial an unprecedented audio-only pre-qualifying round before the contest in Oslo. Of 30 submitted entries, seven were eliminated, including Germany's "Planet of Blue", before the televised final, with only 23 advancing. The elimination provoked notable backlash in Germany, leading to the only time the nation did not appear in a Grand Final, and as a result, viewing figures in the country reduced ten-fold.

In the years after, Marchal-Ortiz signalled a rethink, agreeing to change the qualification approach for the following year so that major TV markets would not be excluded again. From 1997 the contest reverted to a relegation-based cap on participants (rather than a universal pre-qualifier). As pressure on capacity persisted, an exemption from relegation was next created for the four largest contributing EBU members, France, Germany, Spain and the United Kingdom, granting them automatic participation. This “Big Four” status took effect for the 2000 contest (the exemption was introduced the previous year), and later became the “Big Five” on Italy's return in 2011.

In 2002, she decided to step down from her role to spend more time with her family. However, one of her most significant contributions to contest came shortly after she left the role, when on 29 January 2003, her successor, Sarah Yuen announced that from 2004, the contest would adopt a two-night format with a newly created Semi-Final feeding into the Grand Final, ending relegation and allowing all active members to enter annually.
