= Andreas Melchior Seip Diesen =

Norwegian physician

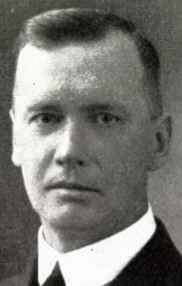
- Born: 23 September 1881; Norderhov, Norway
- Died: 12 November 1958 (aged 77)
- Occupation: Physician
- Children: Ernst Diesen
- Relatives: Emil Diesen (brother); Kari Diesen (daughter-in-law); Andreas Diesen (grandson)

Andreas Melchior Seip Diesen (23 September 1881 – 12 November 1958) was a Norwegian physician. He was the city physician (Norwegian: stadsfysikus) in Oslo, and member of the Administrative Council in 1940.

== Personal life ==
Diesen was born in Norderhov (later merged into Ringerike), a son of Army officer Ernst Georg Diesen and Anna Seip, and a brother of editor Emil Diesen.

He married Sofie Elisabeth Aars Brodtkorb in 1912. They were the parents of actor and theatre director Ernst Diesen, and thus parents-in-law of actress Kari Diesen, and grandparents of journalist Andreas Diesen.

== Career ==
Diesen graduated as cand.med. in 1908. He served as city physician (stadsfysikus) in Oslo from 1930 to 1951. During the early part of the German occupation of Norway, from April to September 1940, he was member of the Administrative Council, where he served as Minister of Social Affairs.

Diesen died on 12 November 1958.
