= Bjørn Sand =

Norwegian revue writer and actor (1928–2024)

- Born: 19 September 1928; Oslo, Norway
- Died: 18 December 2024 (aged 96)
- Occupations: Revue writer Actor
- Notable work: Stutum Speaking (1973, with Totto Osvold)
- Spouse: Unni Bernhoft
- Children: Jon Ola Sand
- Relatives: Rolf Sand (half brother); Bias Bernhoft (father-in-law)
- Awards: Spellemannprisen (1973); Leonard Statuette (1994)

Bjørn Hjalmar Sand (19 September 1928 – 18 December 2024) was a Norwegian revue writer and actor.

== Life and career ==
Sand was born in Oslo on 19 September 1928, and was half brother of Rolf Sand. He married Unni Bernhoft in 1955, was son-in-law of Bias Bernhoft and was the father of Jon Ola Sand. He is particularly known for his character "Stutum" on Norwegian radio in collaboration with Totto Osvold, a role which earned him and Osvold the award Spellemannprisen 1973. He was awarded the Leonard Statuette in 1994.

Sand died on 18 December 2024, at the age of 96.
