= Randi Heide Steen =

Norwegian operatic soprano

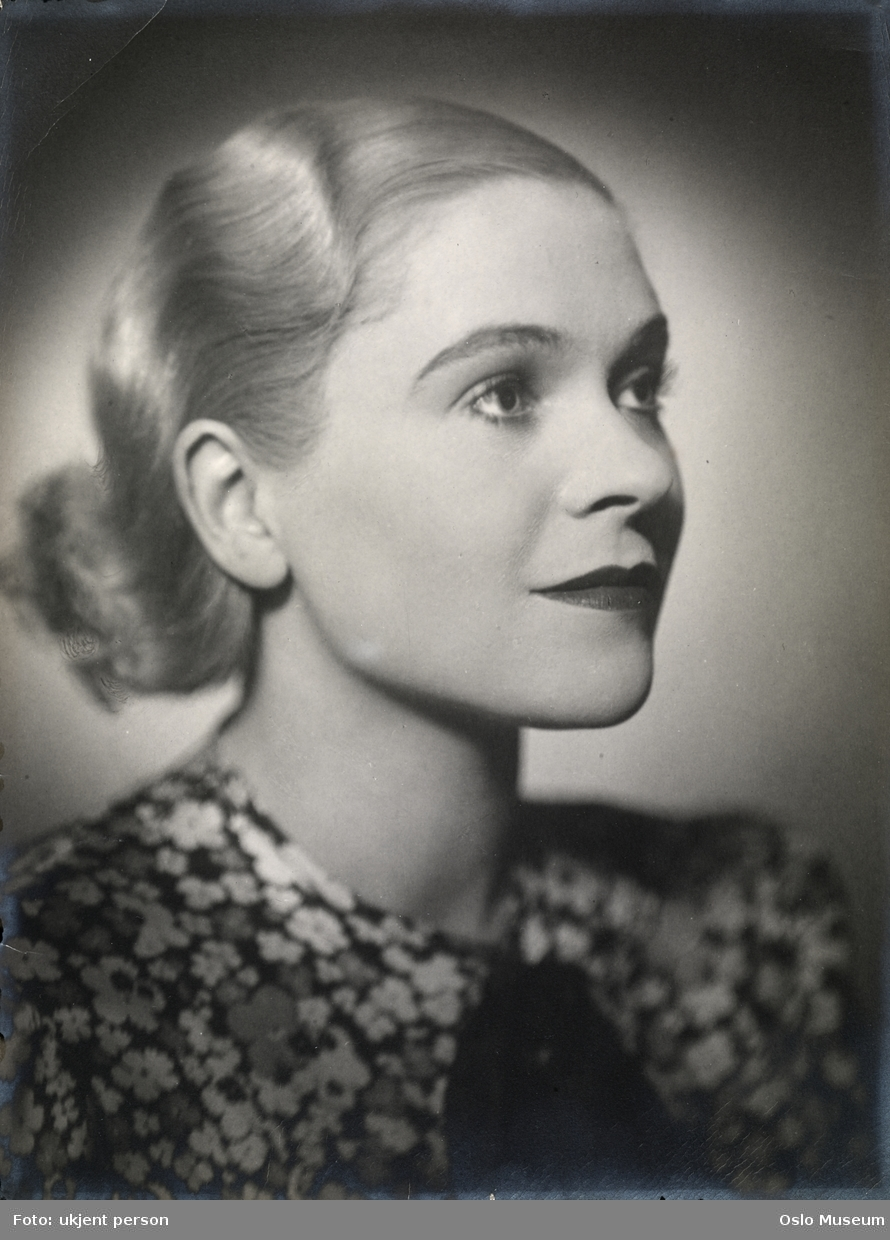
Randi Heide Steen (circa 1935)

Randi Heide Steen (15 December 1909 – 12 November 1990) was a Norwegian soprano singer.

== Biography ==
Steen was born in Kristiania (now Oslo), Norway. Her parents, Harald Steen (1886–1941) and Signe Heide Steen (1881–1959), were both actors and singers who performed on stage and in opera. Her sister Kari Diesen (1914–1987) was a singer and revue actress. Her brother Harald Heide Steen (1911–1980) was a film actor. His son, Harald Heide-Steen Jr. (1939–2008), was a radio performer, actor, and comedian.

Steen was a student of opera singer Borghild Langaard (1883–1939). She was also trained by vocalist Haldis Isene (1891–1978), wife of opera singer Ola Isene (1898–1973).

She made her operetta debut at the Casino Theatre in Oslo during 1927 and her concert debut in 1931. She performed at both the National Theatre and at Chat Noir in Oslo. She was a member of the Norwegian Association of Artists (kunstnerforeningen). She also chaired the Norwegian Opera Society (Norsk Operasangerforbund) from 1958 to 1963 and later became an honorary member of the society.

In 1959, she received the King's Medal of Merit (Kongens fortjenstmedalje) in gold. She was married to Thorbjørn Sigurd Jacobsen (1912–1967). Their daughter is the stage and film actress Anne Marit Jacobsen.
