= Gert Kark =

Estonian television producer

- Born: Tallinn, Estonia
- Occupation: Television producer
- Employer: European Broadcasting Union

Executive producer of the Eurovision Song Contest
- Incumbent
- Assumed office 30 October 2025
- Preceded by: Martin Österdahl (as executive supervisor)

Gert Kark is an Estonian television producer who works for the European Broadcasting Union (EBU). He has been the executive producer of the Eurovision Song Contest on behalf of the EBU since 2025.

== Career ==
Kark worked in theatre before moving into television, including at Ugala in Viljandi and at Vanemuine in Tartu.

In 2011, Kark joined Eesti Televisioon (ETV), where he worked as an administrator for Terevisioon. He later worked on Ringvaade and other broadcasts. In 2012, he worked with the ETV sports department while staff members were covering the 2012 Summer Olympics.

Kark joined the EBU in 2016 as project manager for the Junior Eurovision Song Contest. The following year, his responsibilities were expanded to include the Eurovision Song Contest.

In October 2025, Kark joined the Eurovision Song Contest Reference Group as the EBU representative, taking the seat held by Martin Österdahl, who had stepped down as executive supervisor of the contest. ESCXTRA reported that EBU and Eurovision listings described Kark as "Eurovision Song Contest Executive Producer", a role that followed changes to the contest team after Österdahl's departure. The Eurovision Song Contest 2026 was the first contest with Kark as head producer and executive director.
