= Leif Juster =

Norwegian comedian (1910–1995)

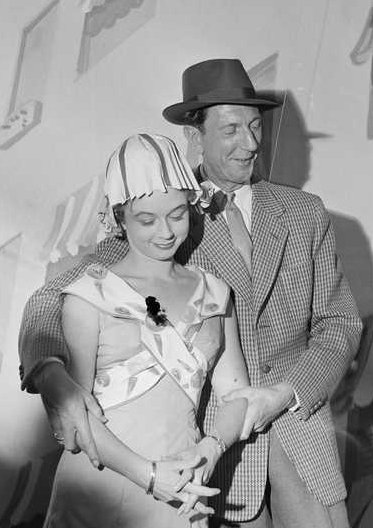
- Juster with actress Unni Bernhoft in 1959
- Born: Leif Normann Nilsen; 14 February 1910; Christiania, Oslo
- Died: 25 November 1995 (aged 85); Bærum, Akershus
- Resting place: Oslo Western Civil Cemetery
- Known for: Film actor

Leif Juster (born Leif Normann Nilsen) (14 February 1910 – 25 November 1995) was a Norwegian comedian, singer and actor, arguably the most popular of his generation in Norway. Juster started out as a variety show performer, and for a period he ran the theater Edderkoppen. Characterised by his unusually tall, lanky figure and squeaky voice, his signature act was the monologue "Mot normalt". He also acted in several successful comedies on the big screen, notably Den forsvundne pølsemaker (1941), Det æ'kke te å tru (1942), En herre med bart (1942) and Fjols til fjells (1957).

He was the uncle of another of Norway's most beloved comedians, the late Rolf Just Nilsen.
