= Ernst Diesen =

Norwegian revue and film actor and theatre director

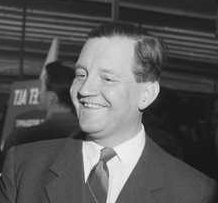
- Born: 6 April 1913; Kristiania, Norway
- Died: 14 November 1970 (aged 57)
- Occupations: Revue and film actor and theatre director
- Spouse: Kari Diesen (m. 1937)
- Children: Andreas Diesen
- Father: Andreas Melchior Seip Diesen

Ernst Diesen (6 April 1913 – 14 November 1970) was a Norwegian revue and film actor and theatre director.

== Personal life ==
Diesen was born on 6 April 1913 in Kristiania (now Oslo), Norway. He was the son of Andreas Melchior Seip Diesen (1881–1958) and Sofie Elisabeth Aars Brodtkorb (1885–1968). In 1937, he married the singer and revue actress Kari Diesen (1914–1987). They were the parents of Andreas Diesen.

== Career ==
Diesen studied at the theater school operated by Max Reinhardt in Berlin from 1932 to 1933. He was a student at Det Nye Teater from 1933 to 1934. He worked for the revue theatre Chat Noir from 1934 to 1942 and as theater director from 1950 to 1953. He was at the Edderkoppen Theatre from 1943 to 1950 and again from 1954 to 1959.

He also acted in several films, including the comedy films Bør Børson Jr. from 1938, Den forsvundne pølsemaker from 1941, Det æ'kke te å tru from 1942, Smuglere i smoking, and Pappa tar gull from 1964.

Diesen died in Oslo on 14 November 1970.
