= Sarah Yuen =

British television executive and journalist

- Born: Sarah Yuen Gilliat; 1965 (age 60–61); England
- Occupations: Television executive, journalist

Executive supervisor of the Eurovision Song Contest
- In office 28 November 2002 – 3 June 2003
- Preceded by: Christine Marchal-Ortiz
- Succeeded by: Svante Stockselius

Head of live events at the European Broadcasting Union
- In office 6 November 2000 – 25 March 2005
- Succeeded by: Office abolished

Sarah Yuen Gilliat (born 1965) is a British television executive and journalist who was the acting executive supervisor of the Eurovision Song Contest for the 2003 contest and as the European Broadcasting Union’s head of live events from 2000 to 2005.

== Career ==
Yuen began working in television in the United Kingdom as a teenager, progressing through research, production and newsroom roles before moving into international reporting and documentary production, including several years based in Hong Kong covering major breaking news and making documentaries across Asia.

=== European Broadcasting Union ===
By 1999, Yuen had joined the EBU in Geneva as a news editor, later moving into the organisation’s Live Events unit, and becoming Head of Live Events.

Following the departure of long-serving Eurovision Song Contest executive supervisor Christine Marchal-Ortiz, the EBU appointed Yuen to take responsibility for the 2003 contest, as acting Executive Supervisor for that edition. Although in the role for a single year, in an acting capacity, she was credited with it on the broadcast of the 2003 edition, and is generally listed among the contest’s executive supervisors in official and historical overviews.

As acting supervisor she oversaw preparations with Latvian host broadcaster LTV amid time-pressure on the production schedule, and handled media controversies around the Russian act t.A.T.u., who drew headlines over rehearsal no-shows and on-air conduct. Yuen publicly downplayed the furore, calling the duo “the bad girls of pop”, while the EBU prepared contingencies to ensure a family-friendly broadcast.

Yuen was instrumental in the song contest's format development during the early 2000s that led to the introduction of a semi-final from 2004; contemporary reporting identified her as the official who communicated this decision to the press.

After appointing Svante Stockselius as executive supervisor from 2004, she continued in EBU Live Events roles in the early–mid 2000s, with responsibilities spanning the Eurovision family of contests (including Eurovision Young Dancers and Junior Eurovision Song Contest).

=== Later journalism and media work ===
After leaving the EBU, Yuen worked at Sky News reporting from Southeast Asia in the 2010s—covering, among other stories, Thailand's “Bangkok shutdown” protests and the Koh Tao murder case.

In the 2010s and 2020s she also worked in strategic communications and training, and later retrained as a clinical hypnotherapist focusing on PTSD and founding the practitioner network CATCH PTSD.
