= List of Norwegian films of the 1950s =

Films Produced in Norway from 1950 - 1959

Films produced in Norway in the 1950s:

== 1950s ==
Title	Director	Cast	Genre	Notes
1950
Marianne på sykehus	Titus Vibe-Müller		Drama	
Kon-Tiki	Thor Heyerdahl	Thor Heyerdahl	Documentary	
To mistenkelige personer	Tancred Ibsen		Crime	Forbidden to be shown in public by the Supreme Court of Norway in 1952, allowed and published in 2007
1951
Vi gifter oss	Nils R. Müller	Henki Kolstad	Comedy	
Kranes konditori	Astrid Henning-Jensen	Wenche Foss, Aud Schønemann, Harald Heide Steen	Drama	
Alt dette - og Island også	Johan Jacobsen, Erik Faustman		Drama	
1952
Nødlanding	Arne Skouen		War film, Drama, Thriller	Entered into the 1952 Cannes Film Festival
Andrine og Kjell	Kåre Bergstrøm		Drama, Romance	
1953
Skøytekongen	Nils R. Müller		Drama	
Ung frue forsvunnet	Edith Carlmar		Drama	
Selkvinnen	Lauritz Falk	Lauritz Falk	Drama	
Brudebuketten	Bjørn Breigutu		Comedy	
1954
Aldri annet enn bråk	Edith Calmar		Comedy, Drama	
Cirkus Fandango	Arne Skouen		Drama	Entered into the 1954 Cannes Film Festival
Heksenetter	Leif Sinding		Drama	
Kasserer Jensen	Nils R. Müller		Comedy	
Karius og Baktus	Ivo Caprino	Thorbjørn Egner (voice)	Stop-motion animation short	
1955
Bedre enn sitt rykte	Edith Calmar		Romance, Drama, Comedy	
Det brenner i natt!	Arne Skouen		Thriller	Entered into the 1955 Cannes Film Festival
Blodveien	Kåre Bergstrøm, Rados Novakovic		War	
Galapagos	Thor Heyerdahl		Documentary	
Hjem går vi ikke	Walter Fyrst		Drama	
Arthurs forbrytelse	Sverre Bergli		Drama	
1956
Ektemann alene	Nils R. Müller		Comedy	
Kvinnens plass	Nils R. Müller		Drama, Comedy	
Gylne ungdom	Leif Sinding		Drama, Crime	
Roser til Monica	Bjarne Andersen		Drama	
Toya	Eric Heed		Children's Film	
1957
Nine Lives	Arne Skouen		War film, Drama, Biopic, Adventure	Nominated for Academy Award for Best Foreign Language Film and entered into the 1958 Cannes Film Festival
Fjols til fjells	Edith Calmar	Leif Juster, Frank Robert	Comedy	
Stevnemøte med glemte år	Jon Lennart Mjøen		Drama	Entered into the 7th Berlin International Film Festival
Peter van Heeren	Sigval Maartmann-Moe		Crime	
Lapland Calendar	Per Høst			Entered into the 1957 Cannes Film Festival
1958
De dødes tjern	Kåre Bergstrøm		Horror	
Høysommer	Arild Brinchmann		Drama	
I slik en natt	Sigval Maartmann-Moe		Thriller, war	
Ut av mørket	Arild Brinchmann		Drama	Entered into the 8th Berlin International Film Festival
1959
Herren og Hans tjenere	Arne Skouen	Claes Gill, Wenche Foss	Drama	Entered into the 9th Berlin International Film Festival
Ugler i mosen	Ivo Caprino	Grethe Kausland	Live action with stop-motion animation	
Støv på hjernen	Øyvind Vennerød		Comedy	
Ung flukt	Edith Calmar		Drama	
Jakten	Erik Løchen		Drama, Thriller, Experimental Film	Entered into the 1959 Cannes Film Festival
