= 1957 in film =

The year 1957 in film involved some significant events. The Bridge on the River Kwai topped the year's box office in North America, France, and Germany, and won seven Academy Awards, including Best Picture.

== Top-grossing films (U.S.) ==
The top ten 1957 released films by box office gross in North America are as follows:

Highest-grossing films of 1957
Rank	Title	Distributor	Domestic rentals
1	The Bridge on the River Kwai	Columbia	$15,000,000
2	Peyton Place	20th Century Fox	$11,000,000
3	Sayonara	Warner Bros.	$10,500,000
4	Search for Paradise	Cinerama Releasing	$6,500,000
5	Old Yeller	Buena Vista	$5,900,000
6	Raintree County	MGM	$5,830,000
7	Island in the Sun; A Farewell to Arms	20th Century Fox	$5,000,000
8	Pal Joey	Columbia	$4,700,000
9	Gunfight at the O.K. Corral	Paramount	$4,300,000
10	Don't Go Near the Water	MGM	$4,265,000

== Top-grossing films by country ==
The highest-grossing 1957 films in various countries.

Country	Title	Director	Studio	Revenue	Admissions
France	The Bridge on the River Kwai	David Lean	Columbia Pictures	—N/a	13,481,750
West Germany	The Bridge on the River Kwai	David Lean	Columbia Pictures	—N/a	14,500,000
India	Mother India	Mehboob Khan	Mehboob Productions	₹80,000,000 ($17,000,000)	100,000,000
Italy	The Ten Commandments	Cecil B. DeMille	Paramount Pictures	—N/a	16,800,000
Japan	Emperor Meiji and the Great Russo-Japanese War	Kunio Watanabe	Shintoho	¥800,000,000 ($2,220,000)	20,000,000
Soviet Union	The Sisters	Grigori Roshal	Mosfilm	10,625,000 Rbls ($2,656,000) (Note: 42.5 million Soviet tickets sold, average ticket price of 25 kopecks, 4 Rbls per US$ in 1957)	42,500,000
United Kingdom	The Bridge on the River Kwai	David Lean	Columbia Pictures	—N/a	12,600,000
United States and Canada	The Bridge on the River Kwai	David Lean	Columbia Pictures	$27,200,000	54,400,000

== Events ==
- January 14 – Legendary actor Humphrey Bogart dies at the age of 57 in Los Angeles from esophageal cancer. Best known for his appearances in classic films such as The Petrified Forest, Dead End, The Maltese Falcon, Casablanca, The Treasure of the Sierra Madre, Sabrina; as well as for To Have and Have Not and The Big Sleep co-starring with his wife Lauren Bacall; Bogart was one of the biggest stars of Hollywood's Golden Age and won an Academy Award for Best Actor for his performance in The African Queen. He was named as one of the greatest actors of all-time by the American Film Institute.
- February 1 – US studio RKO ceases domestic distribution of feature films, which is taken over by Universal Pictures.
- May – Ingmar Bergman's The Seventh Seal wins the Special Jury Prize at the 1957 Cannes Film Festival.
- June 6 – Jerry Lewis appears in his first film without Dean Martin in The Delicate Delinquent.
- June – United Artists rejoins the Motion Picture Association of America, following an expansion of the MPAA code appeals board members. The board had previously denied The Man With the Golden Arm a Production Code seal in 1955, leading UA to quit the MPAA.
- October 2 – Raintree County is the first film shot in MGM Camera 65.
- October 16 – First London Film Festival held at the newly opened National Film Theatre.
- December 6 – Ingmar Bergman's Wild Strawberries is released in Sweden. It goes on to win the Golden Bear at the 8th Berlin International Film Festival and the Golden Globe Award for Best Foreign Language Film in 1959.

== Awards ==
Category/Organization	15th Golden Globe Awards February 22, 1958		30th Academy Awards March 26, 1958
Category/Organization	Drama	Comedy or Musical	30th Academy Awards March 26, 1958
Best Film	The Bridge on the River Kwai	Les Girls	The Bridge on the River Kwai
Best Director	David Lean; The Bridge on the River Kwai		
Best Actor	Alec Guinness; The Bridge on the River Kwai	Frank Sinatra; Pal Joey	Alec Guinness; The Bridge on the River Kwai
Best Actress	Joanne Woodward; The Three Faces of Eve	Kay Kendall; Les Girls; Taina Elg; Les Girls	Joanne Woodward; The Three Faces of Eve
Best Supporting Actor	Red Buttons; Sayonara		
Best Supporting Actress	Elsa Lanchester; Witness for the Prosecution		Miyoshi Umeki; Sayonara
Best Foreign Language Film	Confessions of Felix Krull; Tizoc; Woman in a Dressing Gown; Yellow Crow		Nights of Cabiria

== 1957 film releases ==
- February 14 - Cinderella (re-release)
- July 3 - Bambi (re-release)

== Notable films released in 1957 ==
United States unless stated

=== # ===
- 3:10 to Yuma, directed by Delmer Daves, starring Glenn Ford and Van Heflin
- 8 × 8: A Chess Sonata in 8 Movements, directed by Jean Cocteau
- 10th of May (Der 10. Mai) – (Switzerland)
- 12 Angry Men, directed by Sidney Lumet, starring Henry Fonda, Lee J. Cobb, Jack Warden, Jack Klugman, Martin Balsam, E.G. Marshall
- 1918 – (Finland)
- 20 Million Miles to Earth, starring William Hopper, with special effects by Ray Harryhausen

=== A ===
- Aasha, starring Kishore Kumar, Vyjayanthimala and Asha Parekh – (India)
- The Abominable Snowman, starring Peter Cushing and Forrest Tucker – (GB)
- Across the Bridge, starring Rod Steiger – (GB)
- The Admirable Crichton, starring Kenneth More and Diane Cilento – (GB)
- An Affair to Remember, starring Cary Grant and Deborah Kerr
- All Mine to Give, starring Glynis Johns and Cameron Mitchell
- And Quiet Flows the Don (Tikhiy Don) – (U.S.S.R.)
- April Love, starring Shirley Jones and Pat Boone
- The Auntie from Chicago (I theia ap' to Chicago) – (Greece)

=== B ===
- Baby Face Nelson, starring Mickey Rooney
- Back Again, directed by Ezz El-Dine Zulficar, written by Yusuf Sibai, starring Shoukry Sarhan, Mariam Fakhr Eddine and Salah Zulfikar – (Egypt)
- The Bachelor Party, directed by Delbert Mann, written by Paddy Chayefsky, starring Don Murray
- Band of Angels, starring Clark Gable and Yvonne De Carlo
- Barnacle Bill, starring Alec Guinness – (GB)
- The Barretts of Wimpole Street, starring John Gielgud and Jennifer Jones – (GB)
- Beau James, a biopic starring Bob Hope, Vera Miles, Alexis Smith
- La Bestia humana (The Human Beast) – (Argentina)
- The Big Land, starring Alan Ladd and Virginia Mayo
- Bitter Victory, directed by Nicholas Ray, starring Richard Burton – (France/US)
- The Black Scorpion, starring Mara Corday, with special effects by Willis O'Brien
- Blue Murder at St Trinian's, starring Terry-Thomas and Joyce Grenfell – (GB)
- El Bolero de Raquel, starring Cantinflas, Manola Saavedra and Flor Silvestre – (Mexico)
- Bombers B-52, starring Natalie Wood, Karl Malden, Marsha Hunt
- Boy on a Dolphin, starring Alan Ladd, Clifton Webb, Sophia Loren
- The Bridge on the River Kwai, directed by David Lean, starring William Holden, Alec Guinness, Jack Hawkins, Sessue Hayakawa – winner of 7 Oscars, 3 BAFTAS and 3 Golden Globes – (GB)
- Brothers in Law, starring Richard Attenborough and Ian Carmichael – (GB)
- The Brothers Rico, starring Richard Conte
- The Burglar, starring Dan Duryea and Jayne Mansfield (filmed in 1955 but released in 1957 due to sudden popularity of Mansfield)

=== C ===
- The Careless Years, starring Dean Stockwell, Natalie Trundy, Barbara Billingsley
- City of Gold – (Canada)
- Confessions of Felix Krull (Bekenntnisse des Hochstaplers Felix Krull) – (West Germany)
- Country Hotel (Rong Raem Narok) – (Thailand)
- The Cranes Are Flying (Letyat zhuravli), directed by Mikhail Kalatozov – winner of the Palme d'Or – (U.S.S.R.)
- Crime of Passion, starring Barbara Stanwyck, Sterling Hayden, Raymond Burr
- The Crucible (Les Sorcières de Salem), starring Simone Signoret and Yves Montand – (France/East Germany)
- The Curse of Frankenstein, starring Peter Cushing and Christopher Lee – (GB)

=== D ===
- The D.I., directed by and starring Jack Webb
- The Deadly Mantis, starring Craig Stevens and William Hopper
- Decision at Sundown, starring Randolph Scott
- The Delicate Delinquent, starring Jerry Lewis (his first film without Dean Martin) and Darren McGavin
- The Delinquents, directed by Robert Altman
- Designing Woman, starring Gregory Peck and Lauren Bacall
- Desk Set, starring Spencer Tracy, Katharine Hepburn, Gig Young
- The Devil's Hairpin, starring Cornel Wilde
- Do Aankhen Barah Haath (Two Eyes, Twelve Hands) – (India)
- Don Quixote (Don Kikhot) – (U.S.S.R.)
- Don't Go Near the Water, starring Glenn Ford, Gia Scala, Anne Francis
- Drango, starring Jeff Chandler
- Duped Till Doomsday (Betrogen bis zum jüngsten Tag) – (East Germany)

=== E ===
- Early Morning Chill (五更寒), directed by Yan Jizhou – (China)
- Edge of the City, directed by Martin Ritt, starring John Cassavetes, Sidney Poitier, Ruby Dee
- The Enemy Below, produced and directed by Dick Powell, and starring Robert Mitchum, Curd Jürgens, Theodore Bikel, David Hedison

=== F ===
- A Face in the Crowd, directed by Elia Kazan, written by Budd Schulberg, starring Andy Griffith, Patricia Neal, Walter Matthau
- Les Fanatiques (The Fanatics), starring Pierre Fresnay and Michel Auclair – (France)
- A Farewell to Arms, starring Rock Hudson and Jennifer Jones
- A Farewell to the Woman Called My Sister (Wakare no chatsumi-uta shimai-hen) – (Japan)
- Fathers and Sons (Padri e figli), directed by Mario Monicelli, starring Vittorio De Sica – (Italy)
- Fear Strikes Out, starring Anthony Perkins and Karl Malden
- Fire Down Below, starring Rita Hayworth and Robert Mitchum
- The Flute and the Arrow (En Djungelsaga), directed by Arne Sucksdorff – (Sweden)
- Forty Guns, directed by Samuel Fuller, starring Barbara Stanwyck, Barry Sullivan, Gene Barry
- Funny Face, directed by Stanley Donen, starring Audrey Hepburn, Fred Astaire, Kay Thompson

=== G ===
- The Garment Jungle, starring Lee J. Cobb and Gia Scala
- The Gates of Paris (Porte des Lilas), directed by René Clair – (France/Italy)
- Gateway of India, starring Madhubala – (India)
- The Giant Claw, starring Jeff Morrow and Mara Corday
- The Girl in Black Stockings, starring Lex Barker, Anne Bancroft, Mamie Van Doren
- The Girl in the Kremlin, starring Lex Barker and Zsa Zsa Gabor
- The Girl Most Likely, starring Jane Powell and Cliff Robertson
- Les Girls, aka Cole Porter's Les Girls, starring Gene Kelly, Kay Kendall, Taina Elg, Mitzi Gaynor
- La grande strada azzurra (The Wide Blue Road) – (Italy)
- Gun for a Coward, starring Fred MacMurray
- Gunfight at the O.K. Corral, directed by John Sturges, starring Burt Lancaster, Kirk Douglas, Rhonda Fleming

=== H ===
- The Halliday Brand, starring Joseph Cotten and Viveca Lindfors
- A Hatful of Rain, directed by Fred Zinnemann, starring Eva Marie Saint, Don Murray, Anthony Franciosa
- He Who Must Die (Celui qui doit mourir), directed by Jules Dassin – (France)
- Heaven Knows, Mr. Allison, directed by John Huston, starring Deborah Kerr and Robert Mitchum
- The Helen Morgan Story, starring Paul Newman and Ann Blyth
- Hell Drivers, directed by Cy Endfield, starring Stanley Baker, Peggy Cummins, Patrick McGoohan – (GB)
- Hour of Decision, starring Jeff Morrow and Hazel Court – (GB)
- The House of the Angel (La Casa del ángel) – (Argentina)

=== I ===
- I Am Waiting (Ore wa matteru ze) – (Japan)
- The Incredible Shrinking Man, directed by Jack Arnold, starring Grant Williams
- Interlude, directed by Douglas Sirk, starring June Allyson
- Island in the Sun, starring Dorothy Dandridge, James Mason, Joan Fontaine, Joan Collins, Harry Belafonte
- Istanbul, starring Errol Flynn

=== J ===
- Jailhouse Rock, starring Elvis Presley
- Jamboree, featuring Dick Clark, Frankie Avalon, Fats Domino
- Jeanne Eagels, starring Kim Novak
- Jet Pilot, starring John Wayne and Janet Leigh
- Joe Butterfly, starring Audie Murphy and Burgess Meredith
- Johnny Tremain, starring Hal Stalmaster and Sebastian Cabot
- The Joker Is Wild, starring Frank Sinatra, Jeanne Crain, Eddie Albert, Mitzi Gaynor

=== K ===
- Kabuliwala (aka The Man) – (India)
- Kanał, directed by Andrzej Wajda – (Poland)
- Kathputli (Puppet), directed by Amiya Chakravarty and Nitin Bose, starring Vyjayanthimala and Balraj Sahni – (India)
- A King in New York, directed by and starring Charles Chaplin – (GB)
- Kiss Them for Me, directed by Stanley Donen, starring Cary Grant, Jayne Mansfield, Suzy Parker

=== L ===
- The Land Unknown, starring Jock Mahoney
- Legend of the Lost, directed by Henry Hathaway, starring John Wayne, Sophia Loren, Rossano Brazzi, Kurt Kasznar
- Let's Be Happy, starring Vera-Ellen and Tony Martin – (GB)
- The Little Hut, starring Ava Gardner – (GB/US)
- Lizzie, starring Eleanor Parker and Joan Blondell
- Love in the Afternoon, directed by Billy Wilder, co-written by Wilder with I. A. L. Diamond, starring Gary Cooper, Audrey Hepburn, Maurice Chevalier
- Loving You, starring Elvis Presley, Lizabeth Scott, Wendell Corey
- The Lower Depths (Donzoko), directed by Akira Kurosawa, starring Toshiro Mifune – (Japan)

=== M ===
- Man of a Thousand Faces, biopic of Lon Chaney, starring James Cagney, Dorothy Malone, Jane Greer, Roger Smith, Robert Evans (as Irving Thalberg)
- Mayabazar (Fantasy Bazaar), starring N. T. Rama Rao – (India)
- Mayerling, a TV film starring Audrey Hepburn
- Men in War, directed by Anthony Mann, starring Robert Ryan and Aldo Ray
- Miracles of Thursday (Los jueves, milagro), directed by Luis García Berlanga, starring Richard Basehart – (Spain)
- Mister Cory, directed by Blake Edwards, starring Tony Curtis, Martha Hyer, Kathryn Grant
- The Monolith Monsters, starring Grant Williams and Lola Albright
- The Monster That Challenged the World, starring Tim Holt
- Mother India, starring Nargis – (India)
- My Gun Is Quick, starring Robert Bray (as Mike Hammer)
- The Mysterians (Chikyū Bōeigun), directed by Ishirō Honda – (Japan)

=== N ===
- N.Y., N.Y., a documentary film by Francis Thompson
- The Naked Truth, starring Terry-Thomas and Peter Sellers – (GB)
- Naya Daur (New Era), directed by B. R. Chopra, starring Dilip Kumar and Vyjayanthimala – (India)
- Night of the Demon, (Curse of the Demon), directed by Jacques Tourneur, starring Dana Andrews – (GB)
- Night Passage, starring James Stewart
- Nights of Cabiria (Le Notti di Cabiria), directed by Federico Fellini – (Italy)
- Nine Lives (Ni Liv) – (Norway)
- No Down Payment, directed by Martin Ritt; starring Joanne Woodward, Cameron Mitchell, Sheree North, Pat Hingle, Patricia Owens, Tony Randall, Barbara Rush, and Jeffrey Hunter

=== O ===
- Oh, Men! Oh, Women!, starring Ginger Rogers and David Niven
- The Oklahoman, starring Joel McCrea and Barbara Hale
- Old Yeller, Walt Disney film, starring Dorothy McGuire, Fess Parker, Tommy Kirk, Kevin Corcoran
- Omar Khayyam, starring Cornel Wilde, John Derek, Debra Paget, Yma Sumac
- The One That Got Away, starring Hardy Krüger – (GB)
- Operation Mad Ball, starring Jack Lemmon and Ernie Kovacs
- An Osaka Story (Osaka Monogatari) – (Japan)
- The Outcry (Il Grido), directed by Michelangelo Antonioni, starring Steve Cochran and Alida Valli – (Italy)

=== P ===
- The Pajama Game, starring Doris Day
- Pal Joey, directed by George Sidney, starring Frank Sinatra, Rita Hayworth, Kim Novak
- Paths of Glory, directed by Stanley Kubrick, starring Kirk Douglas, Ralph Meeker, Adolphe Menjou
- Paying Guest, starring Dev Anand – (India)
- Perri, a Disney animated film
- Peyton Place, based on novel by Grace Metalious, starring Lana Turner, Hope Lange, Diane Varsi
- The Pied Piper of Hamelin, starring Van Johnson and Claude Rains
- The Pride and the Passion, starring Cary Grant, Frank Sinatra, Sophia Loren
- The Prince and the Showgirl, starring Marilyn Monroe and Laurence Olivier (who also directed)
- Public Pigeon No. 1, starring Red Skelton
- Pyaasa (Thirsty), directed by and starring Guru Dutt – (India)

=== Q ===
- Quatermass 2, starring Brian Donlevy – (GB)

=== R ===
- Raintree County, directed by Edward Dmytryk, starring Montgomery Clift, Elizabeth Taylor, Eva Marie Saint
- The Real End of the Great War (Prawdziwy koniec wielkiej wojny) – (Poland)
- Rock All Night, directed by Roger Corman, starring Abby Dalton
- Rose Bernd, starring Maria Schell and Raf Vallone – (West Germany)
- Run of the Arrow, starring Rod Steiger

=== S ===
- The Sad Sack, starring Jerry Lewis and Peter Lorre
- Saint Joan, directed by Otto Preminger, starring Jean Seberg – (GB/U.S.)
- Sayonara, directed by Joshua Logan, starring Marlon Brando, James Garner, Red Buttons, Miyoshi Umeki
- The Seventh Seal (Det sjunde inseglet), directed by Ingmar Bergman, starring Max von Sydow – (Sweden)
- The Shiralee, starring Peter Finch – (GB)
- Shoot-Out at Medicine Bend, starring Randolph Scott and Angie Dickinson
- Silk Stockings, starring Fred Astaire and Cyd Charisse
- The Singing Ringing Tree (Das singende, klingende Bäumchen) – (East Germany)
- Slaughter on Tenth Avenue, starring Richard Egan and Walter Matthau (see also ballet Slaughter on Tenth Avenue)
- Sleepless (la anam), starring Faten Hamama, Yehia Chehine and Omar Sharif – (Egypt)
- The Smallest Show on Earth, directed by Basil Dearden, starring Bill Travers, Virginia McKenna, Peter Sellers – (GB)
- The Snow Queen (Snezhnaya koroleva) an animated film – (USSR)
- Something of Value, starring Rock Hudson and Sidney Poitier
- The Spirit of St. Louis, starring James Stewart in a biopic of Charles Lindbergh
- Spring Reunion, starring Betty Hutton and Dana Andrews
- Stopover Tokyo, starring Robert Wagner and Joan Collins
- The Story of Esther Costello, starring Joan Crawford, Rossano Brazzi, Heather Sears – (GB)
- The Strange One, starring Ben Gazzara and George Peppard
- The Strange World of Planet X (The Cosmic Monsters), starring Forrest Tucker – (Britain)
- Sweet Smell of Success, directed by Alexander Mackendrick, written by Ernest Lehman, starring Burt Lancaster and Tony Curtis

=== T ===
- The Tall T, directed by Budd Boetticher, starring Randolph Scott and Richard Boone
- Tammy and the Bachelor, starring Debbie Reynolds and Leslie Nielsen
- The Tarnished Angels, directed by Douglas Sirk; starring Rock Hudson, Dorothy Malone, Robert Stack
- The Tattered Dress, starring Jeanne Crain, Jeff Chandler, Jack Carson
- Ten Thousand Bedrooms, starring Dean Martin
- The Three Faces of Eve, starring Joanne Woodward and Lee J. Cobb
- Three Violent People, starring Charlton Heston, Anne Baxter, Forrest Tucker
- Throne of Blood (Kumonosu-jō), directed by Akira Kurosawa, starring Toshiro Mifune – (Japan)
- Time Limit, directed by Karl Malden, starring Richard Widmark, Richard Basehart, June Lockhart
- The Tin Star, starring Anthony Perkins, Henry Fonda, Betsy Palmer
- Tip on a Dead Jockey, starring Robert Taylor, Dorothy Malone, Jack Lord
- Tizoc, starring Pedro Infante and María Félix – (Mexico)
- Top Secret Affair, starring Kirk Douglas and Susan Hayward
- The Tough (Al-Fetewa) – (Egypt)
- Tumsa Nahin Dekha, starring Shammi Kapoor – (India)

=== U ===
- The Undead
- The Unholy Wife, starring Diana Dors and Rod Steiger
- Untamed Youth, starring Mamie Van Doren
- Until They Sail, starring Paul Newman, Piper Laurie, Jean Simmons

=== V ===
- Valerie, directed by Gerd Oswald, starring Sterling Hayden, Anita Ekberg, Anthony Steel
- El vampiro (The Vampire) – (Mexico)
- Voodoo Island, starring Boris Karloff and Jean Engstrom

=== W ===
- The Way to the Gold, starring Jeffrey Hunter and Sheree North
- The Wayward Bus, starring Jayne Mansfield, Joan Collins, Dan Dailey
- White Nights (Le Notti Bianche), directed by Luchino Visconti, starring Maria Schell and Marcello Mastroianni – (Italy)
- Whom God Forgives (Amanecer en Puerta Oscura) – (Spain)
- Wild Is the Wind, starring Anna Magnani and Anthony Quinn
- Wild Strawberries (Smultronstället), directed by Ingmar Bergman, starring Bibi Andersson and Victor Sjöström – (Sweden)
- Will Success Spoil Rock Hunter?, starring Jayne Mansfield (reprising her Broadway role) and Tony Randall
- The Wings of Eagles, starring John Wayne and Maureen O'Hara (their 4th film together)
- Witness for the Prosecution, directed by Billy Wilder, starring Tyrone Power, Marlene Dietrich, Charles Laughton
- Woman in a Dressing Gown, directed by J. Lee Thompson – (GB)

=== Y ===
- Yagyu Secret Scrolls (Yagyu Bugeicho), starring Toshiro Mifune – Japan
- Yellow Crow (Kiiroi karasu) – (Japan)
- Young and Dangerous, starring Mark Damon
- The Young Stranger, directed by John Frankenheimer; starring James MacArthur, Kim Hunter, James Daly, James Gregory, Whit Bissell

=== Z ===
- Zero Hour!, starring Dana Andrews, Sterling Hayden, Linda Darnell, Elroy "Crazylegs" Hirsch, dramatic basis for later spoof Airplane!

== Short film series ==
- Looney Tunes (1930–1969)
- Terrytoons (1930–1964)
- Merrie Melodies (1931–1969)
- The Three Stooges (1934–1959)
- Tom and Jerry (1940–1958)
- Woody Woodpecker (1941–1972)
- Droopy (1943–1958)
- Noveltoons (1943–1967)
- The Nearsighted Mister Magoo (1950–1959)
- Casper the Friendly Ghost (1950–1959)
- Herman and Katnip (1952–1959)
- Chilly Willy (1953–1972)

Ending this year

- Popeye the Sailor (1933-1957)
- Maggie and Sam (1955-1957)
- Spike and Tyke (1957)

== Births ==
- January 1 - Meagen Fay, American actress
- January 5 - Jeep Swenson, South African-American professional wrestler, stuntman, and actor (d. 1997)
- January 8 - Ron Cephas Jones, American actor (d. 2023)
- January 12 – John Lasseter, American animator, director, producer, and writer
- January 15 – Mario Van Peebles, American actor and director
- January 16 - Ricardo Darin, Argentine actor
- January 17
  - Keith Chegwin, English television presenter and actor (d. 2017)
  - Steve Harvey, American actor, comedian, and author
- January 19 - Roger Ashton-Griffiths, English character actor, screenwriter and director
- January 21
  - Joe Marinelli, American actor (d. 2025)
  - Gregory Paul Martin, British writer and actor
- January 24
  - Adrian Edmondson, English comedian, actor, musician, and television presenter
  - Andy Umberger, American actor
- January 25 – Jenifer Lewis, American actress, comedian, singer and activist
- January 27 - Danny Aiello III, American stunt performer, stunt coordinator, director, and actor (d. 2010)
- January 28 - Harley Jane Kozak, American actress
- January 29 - Diane Delano, American character actress (d. 2024)
- February 1 - Cylk Cozart, American actor, director, writer and producer
- February 6
  - Kathy Najimy, American actress
  - Robert Townsend, American actor, director and writer
- February 14 - Ken Wahl, American actor
- February 16 – LeVar Burton, American actor, director, producer, and author
- February 19 – Ray Winstone, English actor
- February 22 - Robert Bathurst, English actor
- February 26 - C. J. Graham, American actor
- February 27 – Timothy Spall, English actor
- February 28 – John Turturro, American actor, writer and director
- March 4 - Mykelti Williamson, American actor
- March 6
  - Eddie Deezen, American actor and comedian
  - Alex McArthur, American actor
- March 8
  - David Paul, American actor (d. 2020)
  - Peter Paul, former American actor and producer
  - Cynthia Rothrock, American actress
- March 9 - Oliver Stritzel, German actor
- March 12 - Jerry Levine, American actor and director
- March 13 - Daniel Licht, American composer (d. 2017)
- March 15
  - Park Overall, American actress
  - David Silverman, American animator
- March 20
  - Amy Aquino, American actress
  - Vanessa Bell Calloway, American actress
  - Spike Lee, American director, producer, writer and actor
  - Theresa Russell, American actress
  - Chris Wedge, American director, producer, and voice actor
- March 21 - Haydn Gwynne, English actress (d. 2023)
- March 23
  - Teresa Ganzel, American actress
  - Amanda Plummer, American actress
- March 27
  - Stephen Dillane, English actor
  - Caroline Williams, American actress and producer
- March 28 – Paul Eiding, American actor, voice actor, and voice instructor
- March 29 – Christopher Lambert, French actor
- March 30
  - Michael Lehmann, American director
  - Tawny Moyer, American actress
- March 31 - Marc McClure, American actor
- April 4 – Aki Kaurismäki, Finnish director
- April 7 - Phoebe Nicholls, English actress
- April 12 – Suzzanne Douglas, American actress (d. 2021)
- April 13
  - Gary Kroeger, American actor and announcer
  - Saundra Santiago, American actress
- April 14
  - Richard Jeni, American actor and comedian (d. 2007)
  - Marc Platt, American producer
- April 23 – Jan Hooks, American actress and comedian (d. 2014)
- April 25 - Esther Scott, American actress
- April 27 - Robert Curtis Brown, American actor
- April 29 – Daniel Day-Lewis, English actor
- May 4 - John Akomfrah, Ghanaian-born British filmmaker
- May 5 – Richard E. Grant, English actor
- May 7
  - Ned Bellamy, American actor
  - Jordan Lund, American actor
- May 10 - Alex Jennings, English actor
- May 13 - Mark Heap, English actor and comedian
- May 15 - Dan Patrick, American sportscaster, radio personality and actor
- May 17 - Whip Hubley, American actor
- May 21 – Judge Reinhold, American actor
- May 22 - Seema Azmi, Indian actress
- May 23 - Mark Arnold, American actor
- May 27 - Chelsea Field, American actress
- May 29
  - Ted Levine, American actor
  - Oliver Muirhead, English character actor
- May 30 - Aire Koop, Estonian actress
- June 1 – Dorota Kędzierzawska, Polish director and screenwriter
- June 3 - Clive Mantle, English actor
- June 5 - Steven Pacey, English actor
- June 8 - Dimple Kapadia, Indian actress
- June 10 - Robert Clohessy, American actor
- June 14 - Jay Roach, American filmmaker
- June 17
  - Sam Douglas, British actor
  - Jon Gries, American actor
  - Phyllida Lloyd, English director and producer
- June 18
  - Ralph Brown, English actor and writer
  - Andrea Evans, American actress
- June 19 - Michael Maloney, British actor
- June 23 – Frances McDormand, American actress
- June 25 - Giuseppe Cederna, Italian actor
- June 29 – María Conchita Alonso, Cuban-Venezuelan singer and actress
- July 2 - Bret Hart, Canadian-American pro wrestler
- July 5 - James Tillis, American former professional boxer and actor
- July 9 – Kelly McGillis, American actress
- July 12 - Christopher Quinten, British actor
- July 13 – Cameron Crowe, American director and screenwriter
- July 19 - Terri Treas, American actress, writer and director
- July 20 – Donna Dixon, American actress, wife of Dan Aykroyd
- July 21
  - Sulev Keedus, Estonian director and screenwriter
  - Jon Lovitz, American actor, comedian and singer
- July 26 – Nana Visitor, American actress
- July 27 - Bill Engvall, American actor and stand-up comedian
- July 28 - Lisa Freeman, American author and actress
- July 30 - Victor Slezak, American actor
- August 1 - Taylor Negron, American actor, comedian and writer (d. 2015)
- August 2 - Mojo Nixon, American musician and actor (d. 2024)
- August 5
  - Jerry Lambert, American actor
  - Joanne Samuel, Australian actress
- August 7 - Faith Prince, American actress and singer
- August 9 – Melanie Griffith, American actress
- August 15
  - Željko Ivanek, Slovenian-American actor
  - Mark Rosman, American director, producer and screenwriter
- August 16 – Laura Innes, American actress
- August 17
  - Tim Bagley, American actor and comedian
  - Ken Kwapis, American film and television director
- August 18
  - Carole Bouquet, French actress
  - Denis Leary, American actor, comedian and writer
- August 19 - Martin Donovan, American actor
- August 24 – Stephen Fry, English comedian, author and actor
- August 25 - Simon McBurney, English actor
- August 26 - Ewan Stewart, Scottish actor
- August 27 - Đơn Dương, Vietnamese actor (d. 2011)
- August 28
  - Rick Rossovich, American actor
  - Daniel Stern, American actor
- September 1 – Gloria Estefan, Cuban-American singer-songwriter and actress
- September 2 - Steve Porcaro, American composer
- September 4 - Khandi Alexander, American choreographer and actress
- September 8 - Heather Thomas, American actress
- September 10 – Kate Burton, American actress
- September 12
  - Rachel Ward, English actress
  - Hans Zimmer, German composer
- September 16 - Maria Gladkowska, Polish actress
- September 19
  - Mark Acheson, Canadian actor
  - Stephen Hibbert, British-American actor and writer (d. 2026)
- September 21 – Ethan Coen, American director, producer, screenwriter and editor
- September 23
  - Rosalind Allen, New Zealand actress
  - Rosalind Chao, American actress
- September 24 – Brad Bird, American animator, director, writer and actor
- September 25 – Michael Madsen, American actor (d. 2025)
- September 30 – Fran Drescher, American actress
- October 4 – Bill Fagerbakke, American actor and voice actor
- October 5
  - Phil Cornwell, English actor, comedian and writer
  - Bernie Mac, American actor and comedian (d. 2008)
- October 6 - Luis Saguar, American actor and writer (d. 2009)
- October 11
  - Dawn French, English actress, comedian and writer
  - Eric Keenleyside, Canadian actor
- October 12
  - Clémentine Célarié, French actress
  - Camilla and Carey More, English twin actresses
- October 13 - Marc Macaulay, American actor
- October 17 – Lawrence Bender, American film producer
- October 19 - Sheri Foster, American actress
- October 23 - Elizabeth D'Onofrio, American actress
- October 24 – John Kassir, American actor and comedian
- October 25 – Nancy Cartwright, American voice actress
- October 28
  - Betsy Aidem, American actress
  - Christian Berkel, German actor
- October 29
  - Dan Castellaneta, American actor, voice actor, comedian, and screenwriter
  - Scott Thomson, American actor
- October 30 – Kevin Pollak, American actor
- November 2 - Michael Bailey Smith, American actor
- November 3 – Dolph Lundgren, Swedish actor and director
- November 5 - Elizabeth Bracco, American actress
- November 6
  - Cam Clarke, American voice actor and singer
  - Lori Singer, American actress and cellist
- November 7 - Christopher Knight, American actor
- November 15 - Ray McKinnnon, American actor, screenwriter, director and producer
- November 18 - Joey Miyashima, American actor
- November 19
  - Ofra Haza, Israel singer, songwriter and actress (d. 2000)
  - Tom Virtue, American actor
- November 21 - Michiko Nishiwaki, Japanese actress and stuntwoman
- November 24 – Denise Crosby, American actress
- November 29 - Charles Grant, American actor
- November 30 – Gary Lewis, Scottish actor
- December 3 – Valérie Quennessen, French actress (d. 1989)
- December 10
  - João Canijo, Portuguese director (d. 2026)
  - Michael Clarke Duncan, American actor (d. 2012)
- December 12 – Higgins, American dog actor (d. 1975)
- December 13
  - Steve Buscemi, American actor
  - Billy Van Zandt, American actor
- December 19
  - John Gulager, American actor and director
  - Michael Milhoan, American actor
- December 21 – Ray Romano, American actor, comedian, screenwriter, and voice actor
- December 24 – Scott Spiegel, American screenwriter, director, producer and actor (d. 2025)
- December 29 – Brad Grey, American television and film producer (d. 2017)
- December 30 – Joanna Pacula, Polish actress
- December 31 – Brian Howe, American actor

== Deaths ==
- January 14 – Humphrey Bogart, 57, American actor, Casablanca, The Maltese Falcon, Key Largo, The Caine Mutiny
- January 19 – Sheila Terry, 46, American actress, The Sphinx, The Silk Express
- January 26 – William Eythe, 38, American actor, The Song of Bernadette, The House on 92nd Street
- February 19 – Märta Torén, 31, Swedish actress, Sirocco, One Way Street
- March 25 – Max Ophüls, 54, German director, The Earrings of Madame de..., Lola Montès
- March 31
  - Harry Depp, 74, American actor, The Love Girl, Inez from Hollywood
  - Gene Lockhart, 65, Canadian actor, Miracle on 34th Street, Algiers
- April 3 – Ned Sparks, 73, Canadian actor, 42nd Street, Imitation of Life
- April 8 – Dorothy Sebastian, 53, American actress, Spite Marriage, Our Dancing Daughters
- April 27 – Paweł Owerłło, 87, Polish actor, Pan Tadeusz
- May 7 – Charles King, 62, American actor, Outlaws of the Plains, Adventures of Sir Galahad
- May 9 – Ezio Pinza, 64, Italian singer and actor, Tonight We Sing, Mr. Imperium
- May 12 – Erich von Stroheim, 71, Austrian actor, director, Sunset Boulevard, La Grande Illusion
- May 29 – James Whale, 67, British director, Frankenstein, The Invisible Man
- June 12 – Robert Alton, 51, American choreographer and director, White Christmas
- July 3 – Judy Tyler, 24, American actress, Jailhouse Rock, Bop Girl Goes Calypso
- July 15 – George Cleveland, 71, Canadian actor, Carson City, Fort Defiance
- July 24 – Sacha Guitry, 72, French playwright, actor and director, Confessions of a Cheat, A Crime in Paradise
- August 7 – Oliver Hardy, 65, American actor, The Flying Deuces, Sons of the Desert
- August 9 – Konrad Tom, 70, Polish actor, screenwriter, director and singer, His Excellency, The Shop Assistant
- August 12 – Tim Whelan, 63, American director, The Thief of Bagdad, The Divorce of Lady X
- September 1 – Helen Haye, 83, Indian-British actress, The 39 Steps
- September 19 – Edvard Persson, 69, Swedish actor, South of the Highway, Kalle's Inn
- October 20 – Jack Buchanan, 66, British actor, The Band Wagon
- October 29 – Louis B. Mayer, 73, Russian-American producer and studio executive, Greed, That's Entertainment!
- November 7 – Dina Romano, 81, Italian actress, The Materassi Sisters
- November 17 – Cora Witherspoon, 67, American actress, The Bank Dick, Libeled Lady
- November 25 – Raymond Griffith, 62, American actor, Hands Up!, All Quiet on the Western Front
- November 29 – Erich Wolfgang Korngold, 60, Austrian composer, Anthony Adverse, The Adventures of Robin Hood
- November 30 – Fred F. Sears, 44, American director, Earth vs. the Flying Saucers, Rock Around the Clock
- December 11 – Musidora, 58, French actress, director, Les Vampires, Judex
- December 15 – Alfonso Bedoya, 53, Mexican actor, The Treasure of the Sierra Madre
- December 24 – Norma Talmadge, 63, American actress, New York Nights, Secrets
- December 25 – Charles Pathé, 94, French producer, writer, The Conquest of the Pole
- December 27 – Alan Bridge, 66, American actor, The Stranger from Texas, Cross My Heart

== Film debuts ==
- Norman Alden – Hear Me Good
- Luana Anders – Reform School Girl
- Elga Andersen – Les Collégiennes
- Alan Arkin – Calypso Heat Wave
- Jean-Paul Belmondo – On Foot, on Horse, and on Wheels
- Françoise Brion – Love in the Afternoon
- Peter Brown – The Story of Esther Costello
- Lilyan Chauvin – Ten Thousand Bedrooms
- Bernard Cribbins – Yangtse Incident: The Story of H.M.S. Amethyst
- Alain Delon – Send a Woman When the Devil Fails
- Catherine Deneuve – Les Collégiennes
- Anthony Franciosa – This Could Be the Night
- Ben Gazzara – The Strange One
- William Hickey – A Hatful of Rain
- Bill Hunter – The Shiralee
- Clifton James – The Strange One
- Sally Kellerman – Reform School Girl
- Burt Kwouk – Windom's Way
- Margaret Lacey – Brothers in Law
- Sidney Lumet (director) – 12 Angry Men
- Paul Maxwell – Death in Small Doses
- David McCallum – Ill Met by Moonlight
- John McGiver – The Man in the Raincoat
- Dina Merrill – Desk Set
- Zakes Mokae – Donker Afrika
- George Peppard – The Strange One
- Lee Remick – A Face in the Crowd
- Jean Seberg – Saint Joan
- Patsy Smart – The Flying Scot
- Georgina Spelvin – Les Collégiennes
- Liv Ullmann – Fjols til fjells
- Ray Walston – Kiss Them for Me
- Adam West – Voodoo Island
