= Christian Hartmann (composer) =

Norwegian composer (1910–1985)

- Born: 3 June 1910; Asker, Norway
- Died: 29 May 1985 (aged 74)
- Occupation: Composer
- Relatives: Alf Hartmann

Christian Hartmann (3 June 1910 – 29 May 1985) was a Norwegian composer, born in Asker.

Hartmann composed melodies to a number of songs, including Prøysen's "Musevisa", "Romjulsdrøm" and "Æille har et syskjenbån på Gjøvik", and Skjæraasen's "Høstvise" and "Åtte øyne i hverandre". His cooperation with Thorbjørn Egner resulted in music to songs from Karius and Bactus, Doktor Dyregod and Dyrene i Hakkebakkeskogen .

Film music includes compositions for Finn Bø and Titus Vibe-Müller's 1946 film To liv and Per Høst's 1957 film Same-Jakki.

Hartmann was the brother of the journalist and screenwriter Alf Hartmann.
