= Skadeskutt =

- Directed by: Edith Carlmar
- Written by: Otto Carlmar; Victor Borg
- Produced by: Otto Carlmar
- Starring: Carsten Winger; Eva Bergh; Sigrun Otto; Einar Vaage
- Cinematography: Per Jonson
- Edited by: Olav Engebretsen
- Music by: Sverre Arvid Bergh
- Distributed by: Carlmar Film
- Release date: August 27, 1951
- Running time: 94 minutes
- Country: Norway
- Language: Norwegian

Skadeskutt (Wounded) is a Norwegian drama film from 1951 directed by Edith Carlmar. The lead roles are played by Carsten Winger, Eva Bergh, Sigrun Otto, and Einar Vaage.

== Plot ==
The architect Einar Wang (Carsten Winger) has been married to his adoring wife Else (Eva Bergh) for some years. The marriage has been happy, but one thing has cast a shadow over their life together: they have not had a child. Eventually, they decide to have a child. However, it turns out that it is not so simple. Shadows from Einar's past lie in wait. When he was quite young, he had an affair with a young girl, whom he sincerely loved. The girl became pregnant, and they agreed to have an abortion. Then she died because of the procedure. This has tormented Einar all these years, and at times he has felt like a murderer. He is eventually driven into a severe depression. Then one day the depression turns into mental illness, and he is admitted to a psychiatric hospital.

== Cast ==
- Eva Bergh as Else Wang
- Sverre Andersen as a barkeeper
- Nona Bækken as Mrs. Aasen, a patient
- Brita Bigum as Liv, a nurse
- Otto Carlmar as the director of A/S Boligbygg
- Veronica Foyn Christensen as Inger, a nurse
- Svend von Düring as Sandberg, a patient
- Daggen Dybberg as Wang's secretary
- Oscar Egede-Nissen as the assistant doctor on the 6th ward
- Kåre Hegseth as Enger, a doctor
- Egil Hjorth-Jenssen as Andersen, a patient
- Gunnar Hjorth-Jenssen as Falk, an architect
- Levor Lie as Nordlie, an engineer
- Lilly Larson-Lund as a gynecologist
- Sigrun Otto as Else's mother
- Arne Riis as Holst, an engineer
- Astri Rogstad as Aud, a nurse
- Agathe Running as "the nanny," a patient
- Gunnar Simenstad as Rolf Lunde, a doctor
- Alfhild Stormoen as Wang's aunt
- Anders Sundby as the chief physician on the 6th ward
- N. Tinholt as Karlsen, a nurse
- Einar Vaage as the hospital director
- Klara Wang as the head nurse
- Ragnvald Wingar as an alcoholic
- Carsten Winger as Einar Wang, an architect
- Tore Winger as a worker
- Ingrid Øvre Wiik as Miss Brun, a patient (credited as Ingrid Øvre)
- Edith Carlmar as a patient (not credited)
