= Ung frue forsvunnet =

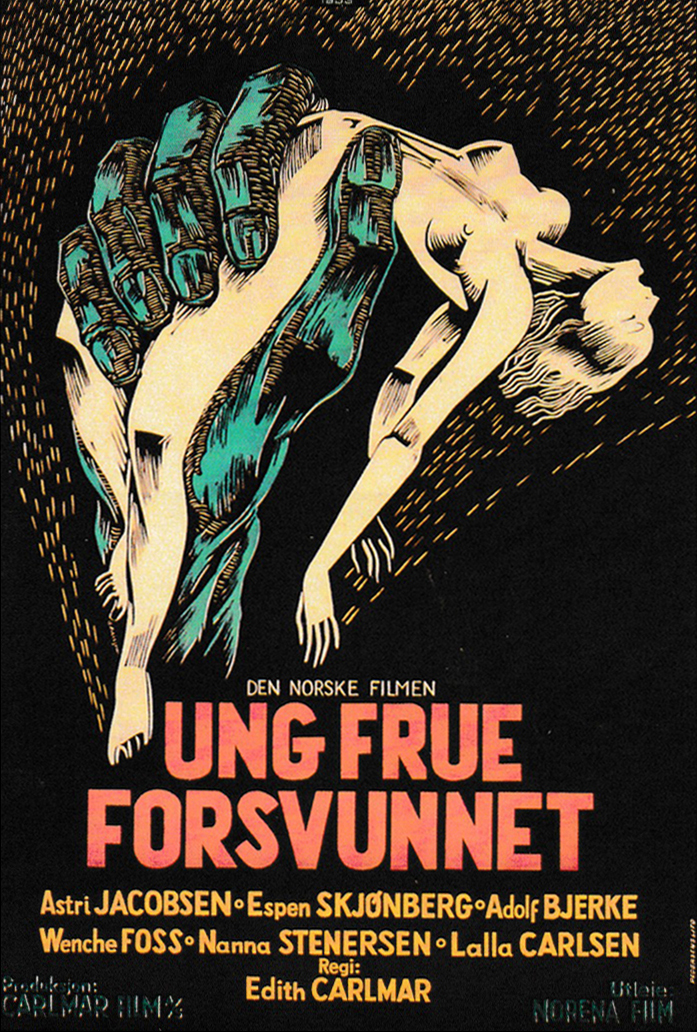
- Alexey Zaitzow's poster for Ung frue forsvunnet
- Directed by: Edith Carlmar
- Written by: Victor Borg; Otto Carlmar
- Produced by: Otto Carlmar
- Starring: Astri Jacobsen; Adolf Bjerke; Lalla Carlsen; Wenche Foss; Espen Skjønberg
- Cinematography: Mattis Mathiesen
- Edited by: Olav Engebretsen
- Music by: Sverre Arvid Bergh
- Distributed by: Carlmar Film
- Release date: August 27, 1953
- Running time: 91 minutes
- Country: Norway
- Language: Norwegian

Ung frue forsvunnet (Young Woman Missing) is a 1953 Norwegian drama film directed by Edith Carlmar. The film stars Astri Jacobsen, Adolf Bjerke, Lalla Carlsen, Wenche Foss, Espen Skjønberg, and Guri Stormoen.

== Plot ==
The university instructor Berger (Adolf Bjerke) returns home from a mountain hike and discovers that his young wife, Eva (Astri Jacobsen), has disappeared. The maid has neither heard nor seen anything from the woman since the day the Berger left. What Berger does not know about his wife's past is that she was addicted to drugs and that her disappearance was due to a relapse. In desperation, she sought out her old friend, the decrepit pharmacist Møller (Espen Skjønberg) who previously led her into drug abuse. On the surface, the marriage seemed to be going well, but no one understood how much it tormented the young woman to feel mentally inferior to her husband.

== Cast ==
- Astri Jacobsen as Eva Berger
- Adolf Bjerke as Arne Berger, a university instructor
- Lalla Carlsen as Johanne Antonsen, the maid
- Kåre Siem as Dr. Krogh
- Vesla Christensen as Ingrid Lindstrøm
- Wenche Foss as Tora Haug, a detective
- Espen Skjønberg as Einar Møller, a pharmacist
- Nanna Stenersen as Birgit Lie, a pharmacist and friend
- Egil Hjorth-Jenssen as Olsen
- Guri Stormoen as Thea
- Signe Bernau as a curious neighbor
- Lisbeth Bull as the detective on duty
- Bjarne Hansen as a police driver
- Arne Hestenes as a police lawyer
- Kåre Løwing as an impatient man
