= Arne Riis =

Norwegian actor (1923–2009)

- Born: June 21, 1923
- Died: April 29, 2009 (aged 85); Oslo, Norway
- Occupation: Actor
- Spouse: Nora Brockstedt

Arne Gurstad Riis (June 21, 1923 – April 29, 2009) was a Norwegian actor.

Riis was engaged with the New Theater from 1949 to 1957. In addition, Riis appeared in eleven film and television roles. He made his screen debut in 1951 in Edith Carlmar's film Skadeskutt. In the 1960s Riis worked for NRK's Television Theater. He played his last television role in 1982 as a Norwegian in the Swedish TV series Polisen som vägrade svara.

Riis was married to the singer Nora Brockstedt.

== Filmography ==
- 1951: Skadeskutt as Holst, an engineer
- 1952: Det kunne vært deg as the mailman
- 1958: I slik en natt as a man at the border
- 1958: Ut av mørket

== NRK Television Theater ==
- 1961: Frisøndag
- 1961: Den anstendige skjøgen
- 1962: Hånden på hjertet
- 1963: Særlingen
- 1965: Frydenberg
- 1965: Raude roser åt meg
- 1965: Smeltedigelen

== TV series ==
- 1982: Polisen som vägrade svara
