= Bedre enn sitt rykte =

- Directed by: Edith Carlmar
- Written by: Otto Carlmar; Eva Seeberg
- Starring: Vigdis Røising; Kari Nordseth; Magne Bleness; Atle Merton
- Release date: 12 September 1955
- Running time: 87 minutes
- Country: Norway
- Language: Norwegian

Bedre enn sitt rykte (English: Better than Their Reputation) is a 1955 Norwegian drama film directed by Edith Carlmar, starring Vigdis Røising, Kari Nordseth, Magne Bleness and Atle Merton. The story is based on a novel by Eva Seeberg.

Dag (Bleness) is finishing school, and needs a top grade to get into medical school. He takes private lessons with the French teacher (Nordseth), and a romantic relation develops between the two. Karin (Røising) is in love with Dag, and waits for the relationship to end, while Roald (Merton) is in love with Karin.
