= The Living Idol =

1957 film by Albert Lewin

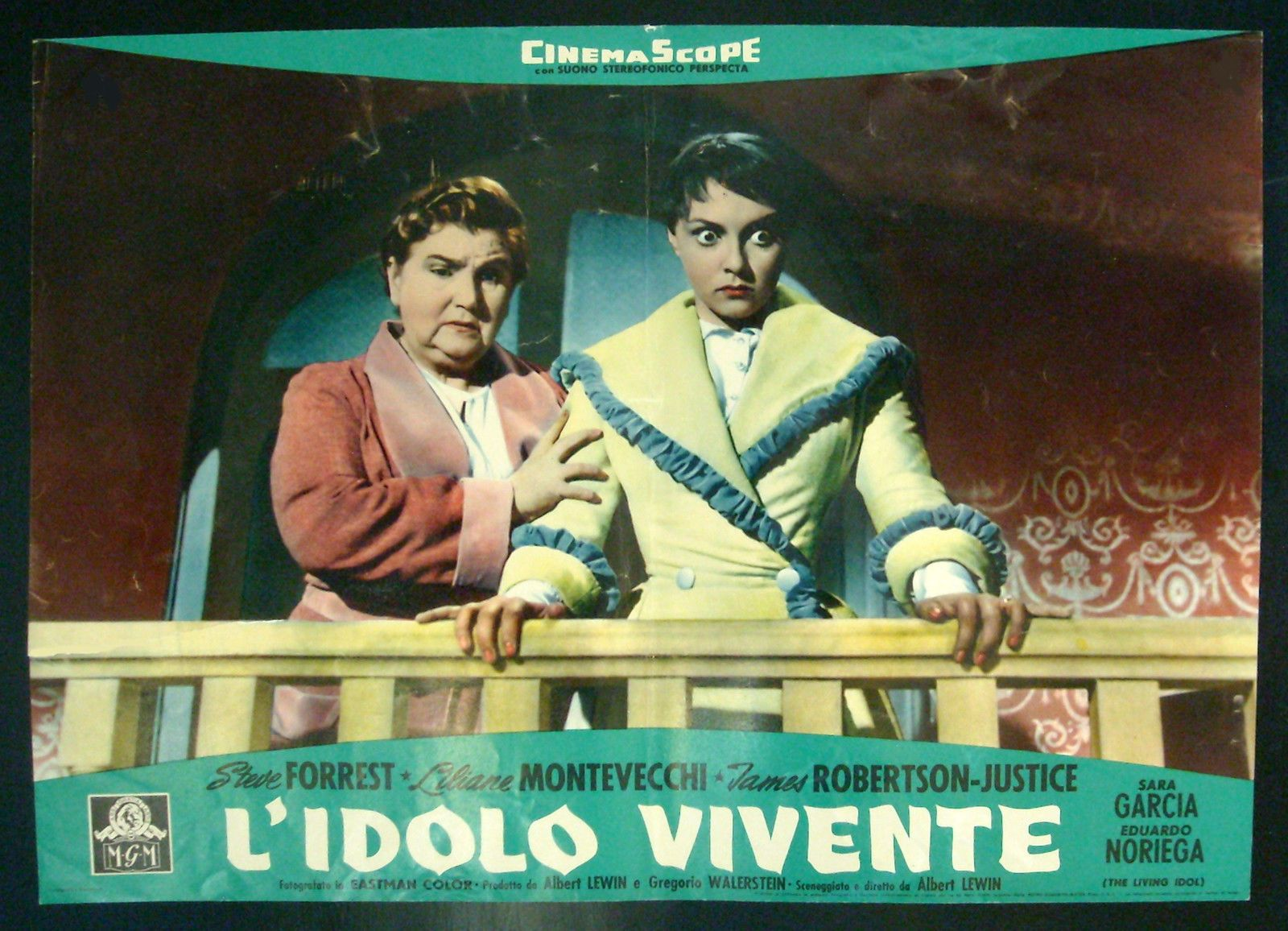
- Directed by: Albert Lewin
- Written by: Albert Lewin
- Produced by: Albert Lewin; Gregorio Walerstein
- Starring: Steve Forrest; Liliane Montevecchi; James Robertson Justice; Sara Garcia; Eduardo Noriega
- Cinematography: Jack Hildyard
- Edited by: Rafael Ceballos; Fernando Martínez
- Music by: Rodolfo Halffter
- Distributed by: Metro-Goldwyn-Mayer
- Release date: May 2, 1957 (New York City)
- Countries: Mexico; United States
- Language: English
- Budget: $360,000
- Box office: $350,000

The Living Idol is a 1957 horror film written, produced and directed by Albert Lewin. It’s an international co-production film between Mexico and the United States.

== Plot ==
An archaeologist believes that a Mexican woman is a reincarnation of an Aztec princess.

== Reception ==
According to MGM records, the film earned $125,000 in the US and Canada and $225,000 elsewhere, making a loss to the studio of $339,000.

== See also ==
- List of American films of 1957
- List of Mexican films of 1957
