= The Wayward Girl =

The Wayward Girl may refer to:

- The Wayward Girl (1957 film), American drama from Republic Pictures
- The Wayward Girl (1959 film), Norwegian drama, Liv Ullmann's film debut
