= List of Spanish films of 1957 =

A list of films produced in Spain in 1957 (see 1957 in film).

== 1957 ==
Title	Director	Cast	Genre	Notes
1957
Amanecer en Puerta Oscura	José María Forqué	Francisco Rabal, Luis Peña	Outlaw	It's about Spanish Bandoleros - Silver Bear at Berlin
Distrito quinto	Julio Coll	Alberto Closas, José María Caffarel	Crime	
El último cuplé	Juan de Orduña	Sara Montiel, Alfredo Mayo	Musical / Drama	
El inquilino	José Antonio Nieves Conde	Fernando Fernán Gómez, María Rosa Salgado, Manuel Alexandre	Drama	Forbidden, cut and edited by censorship.
Faustina	José Luis Sáenz de Heredia	María Félix, Fernando Fernán Gómez	Comedy	Entered into the 1957 Cannes Film Festival
La cenicienta y Ernesto	Pedro Luis Ramirez	Antonella Lualdi, Antonio Garisa	Comedy	
Los amantes del desierto	Goffredo Alessandrini; Fernando Cerchio; León Klimovsky	Carmen Sevilla, Ricardo Montalbán	Adventure	Italian/Spanish co-production
Los jueves, milagro	Luis García Berlanga	Richard Basehart, José Isbert, Manuel Alexandre	Dark comedy	Cut by Spanish censorship; restored by Filmoteca Española
