= På solsiden =

- Directed by: Edith Carlmar
- Written by: Kåre Bergstrøm; Otto Carlmar; Helge Krog
- Produced by: Otto Carlmar
- Starring: Arne Lie; Randi Kolstad; Henny Moan; Ellen Isefiær; Joachim Holst-Jensen
- Cinematography: Sverre Bergli
- Music by: Gunnar Sønstevold
- Distributed by: Carlmar Film; Norsk Film AS
- Release date: 1956
- Running time: 81 minutes
- Country: Norway
- Language: Norwegian

På solsiden (On the Sunny Side) is a Norwegian comedy-drama film from 1956 directed by Edith Carlmar. It stars Arne Lie, Randi Kolstad, Henny Moan, Ellen Isefiær, and Joachim Holst-Jensen. The film is based on Helge Krog's 1927 play of the same name.

== Plot ==
On a warm summer day, the writer Joachim Bris comes to the Riibe estate. He has been invited by Hartvig, the son running the farm. However, not everyone is happy with the visit, which has unexpected consequences for several people in the family. All of them have a part to play when Esther must eventually have a big showdown with those that have always lived "on the sunny side."

== Reception and reissue ==
When the film premiered in 1956, the newspaper Aftenavisen Stavangeren characterized it as "a truly amiable, sunny, and charming comedy." The film was released on DVD in 2005 by Nordisk Film.

== Other ==
The 1936 Swedish film På Solsidan was also an adaptation of Krog's play. It had a script written by Oscar Hemberg and was directed by Gustaf Molander. The film starred Lars Hanson, Ingrid Bergman, Karin Swanström, and Edvin Adolphson.

== Cast ==
- Arne Lie: landowner Hartvig Riibe
- Ellen Isefiær: Margrethe, Hartvig's mother
- Randi Kolstad: Ester Riibe, Hartvig's wife
- Henny Moan: Wenche, Hartvig's sister
- Joachim Holst-Jensen: Uncle Severin
- Frank Robert: Joakim Bris
- Jan Voigt: Preben Klingberg
- Lalla Carlsen: woman in a boat

Minor roles are also played by Otto Carlmar, Haakon Arnold, Ragnar Olason, Odd Johansen, and Odd Rohde.
