= Eva Seeberg =

Norwegian journalist, novelist, and screenwriter (1931–2019)

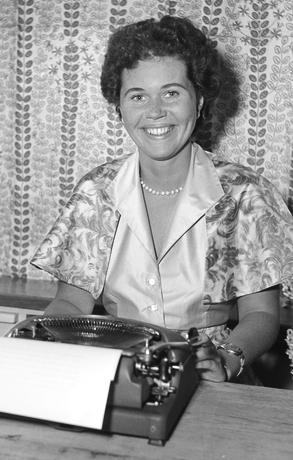
- Seeberg in 1956
- Born: 28 April 1931; Oslo, Norway
- Died: 12 January 2019 (aged 87)
- Occupations: novelist and journalist

Eva Seeberg (28 April 1931 – 12 January 2019) was a Norwegian journalist, novelist and screenwriter. She was born in Oslo. She made her literary debut in 1949 with Undring. Unge skisser. Her novels from the 1960s and 1970s include Det er meg han har vært hos from 1952, Aldri mer alene from 1955, and Tid til ømhet from 1968. She wrote several short story collections, including Lykken bor på Bislett from 1987.

Films based on her novels, short stories or scripts include Bedre enn sitt rykte and Hjem går vi ikke from 1955, Kvinnens plass from 1956, Vaxdockan from 1962, Det är hos mig han har varit from 1963, and Hjelp – vi får leilighet! from 1965.
