= Øivind Bergh =

Norwegian violinist and orchestral leader

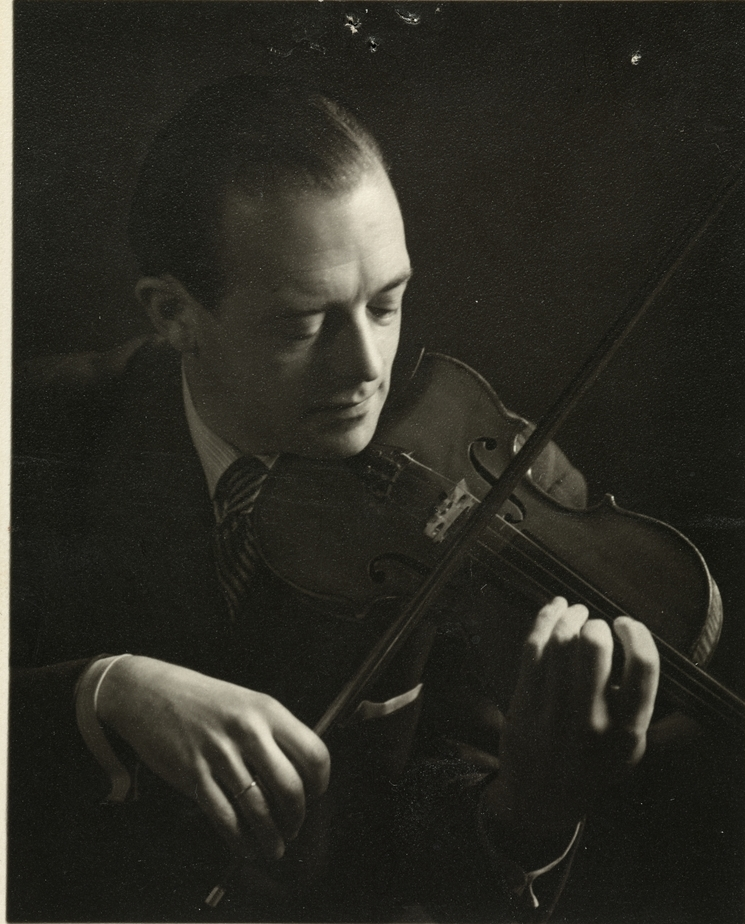
Øivind Bergh

Øivind Bergh (3 December 1909 – 25 January 1987) was a Norwegian violinist and orchestral leader.

== Biography ==
Øivind Ingvard Bergh was born in Hamar, Norway. His parents were Even Johannesen Bergh (1873–1958) and Karen Hanssen (1881–1940). He was the brother of musician Sverre Arvid Bergh (1915–1980) and the brother-in-law of actress Eva Bergh (1926–2013). He was married in 1937 to Rigmor Hansen (1913–1994).

Bergh was educated in Dresden, Germany. In 1938 he was a violinist with the Oslo String Quartet and the following year he started his own orchestra. He was instrumental in establishing the Norwegian Radio Orchestra and was the conductor of the orchestra from its inception in 1946 until 1976. He contributed to more than 5,000 programs for the Norwegian Broadcasting Corporation.

His book Moderne dansemusikk was published in 1946, and his autobiography Takt og tone in 1977.

== Øivind Bergh Memorial Prize ==
The Øivind Bergh Memorial Prize (Øivind Berghs minnepris) was instituted in 1989. It is awarded to young promising violinists, often with a background in folk music. The board of FolkOrg, Peer Gynt AS and the Norwegian Radio Orchestra select the winners of the annual prize.
