= The Wayward Girl (1959 film) =

1959 Norwegian film directed by Edith Carlmar

Ung Flukt or The Wayward Girl is a 1959 Norwegian film directed by Edith Carlmar with a screenplay by Otto Carlmar and Niels Johan Rud.

It marks the acting debut of Norwegian film actress Liv Ullmann who had previously appeared as an uncredited extra in Edith Carlmar's 1957 film Fools in the Mountain.

The film is about the affair between two young lovers, the uneducated and wild Gerd, and her bourgeois boyfriend, university student Anders who decides to run away with Gerd to continue their relationship when his parents disapprove of them.

== Plot ==
Anders (Atle Merton) is about to enter university. He is enamoured with Gerd (Liv Ullmann), a high school drop out who has a reputation for being promiscuous. After Anders's mother refuses to allow Anders to bring Gerd on a camping trip he steals his father's car and runs away with Gerd to a remote hunting cabin he and his father stayed in once before.

Gerd, an illegitimate child raised by a working single mother, dreams of being loved and pampered with luxurious things and is not impressed at first with the shabby cabin and lack of store bought food. Even as Anders attempts to make things more comfortable for Gerd she begins to suffer from mood swings fearing that Anders thinks of her as a whore and is using her for her body. When she tries to run away however Anders finds her and convinces her to come back, promising to take her into town for cigarettes and dancing.

In the meantime the car that Anders and Gerd drove to the cabin is discovered by the local sheriff. Anders's father and Gerd's mother take the train to go and see if they can find the young lovers and bring them home. Gerd's mother is very open, talking to Anders's father about the possibility that Gerd is pregnant and her reputation for being sexually promiscuous, which Anders's father finds shocking. When they arrive they come across Anders and Gerd totally nude which amuses Gerd's mother and embarrasses Anders's father. To the surprise of Anders and Gerd, while their parents lecture them briefly, neither parents forces them to come home, instead leaving them at the cabin with extra supplies.

After two weeks Gerd once again begins to grow bored, especially as Anders has not kept his promise of taking her to town. Just as they are about to kill a sheep they have stolen to eat a stranger arrives. The stranger helps the two to skin the sheep and seems to know everything about their remote area leading Anders to suspect he is the true owner of the cabin, though the man continues to claim he is a stranger to the area. Gerd begins to flirt with the stranger and he begins to make sexual advances towards her as well, much to Anders's dismay.

Later that night the group go to the local store where the stranger breaks in and steals the supplies they need. When Gerd follows him inside she and the stranger share a kiss during which the necklace that Anders made her breaks.

Anders is upset over the grocery robbery and begs Gerd to leave with him. Sick of him Gerd approaches the stranger and begs him to take her with him. He propositions her sexually and grows angry when she declines, calling her a whore but promising to take her with him anyway. Anders, increasingly jealous, threatens to kill Gerd if she leaves him.

Gerd's mother arrives on a scooter to tell Anders that his parents are sick of his excursion with Gerd and are coming the next day to bring him back home. She introduces herself to the stranger who reveals that he really is the owner of the place, Bendik.

The following morning Gerd wakes up early and goes to Bendik hoping to run away with him. As she and Bendik watch, the police arrive and take Anders and Gerd's mother away with them. Anders's parents cover the theft of the sheep and the fact that he tried to pay for his stolen groceries also mostly absolves him of his crimes in the eyes of the police. Furious Anders runs away again and returns to the cabin where he confronts Bendik. In his anger and rage he hits Bendik with an axe and accidentally sets off a fire. Realizing that Bendik is still alive Gerd and Anders drag him out of the barn and try to nurse him back to health.

Anders reveals that he was angry enough to have killed Bendik, making Gerd feel loved. Bendik recovers enough to wake up. He allows Anders and Gerd to leave as Gerd is pregnant and her child needs a father.

== Production ==
Actress Liv Ullmann had to pay for her own plane ticket to audition for Edith Carlmar.
