= List of Egyptian films of 1957 =

A list of films produced in Egypt in 1957. For an A-Z list of films currently on Wikipedia, see Category:Egyptian films.

Title	Director	Cast	Genre	Notes
Ard al-Salam (Land of Peace)	Kamal El Sheikh	Faten Hamama, Omar Sharif	Romance/Drama	
Return My Heart (Back Again)	Ezzel dine Zulfikar	Shoukry Sarhan, Salah Zulfikar, Mariam Fakhr Eddine	Drama	
La Anam (Sleepless)	Salah Abu Seif	Faten Hamama, Yehia Chahine	Drama	
Tareeq al-Amal (The Road of Hope)	Ezzel Dine Zulficar	Faten Hamama, Rushdy Abaza, Shukry Sarhan	Drama / romance	
Al-Fetewa (The Tough)	Salah Abu Seif	Farid Shawki, Taheyya Kariokka, Zaki Rostom	Crime	Entered into the 7th Berlin International Film Festival
