= Gotoma the Buddha =

1956 film

- Directed by: Rajbans Khanna
- Written by: Rajbans Khanna
- Cinematography: Dilip Gupta
- Edited by: Hrishikesh Mukherjee
- Release date: 1956
- Country: India

Gotoma the Buddha is a 1956 Indian documentary film directed by Rajbans Khanna. It was entered into the 1957 Cannes Film Festival, where it won a Special Mention for Best Director and competed for the Palme d'Or (Best Film).

== See also ==
- Depictions of Gautama Buddha in film
