= Aldri annet enn bråk =

- Directed by: Edith Carlmar
- Written by: Martha Sandwall-Bergström
- Produced by: Otto Carlmar
- Starring: Turid Haaland; Stig Egede-Nissen; Vigdis Røising
- Edited by: Bjørn Breigutu
- Music by: Christian Hartmann
- Distributed by: Carlmar Film
- Release date: 30 August 1954
- Running time: 77 minutes
- Country: Norway
- Language: Norwegian

Aldri annet enn bråk is a 1954 Norwegian comedy-drama film, edited by Edith Carlmar. It takes place in a working-class setting in the city of Oslo. The English title is Nothing but Trouble. A 1955 Danish remake, Altid ballade, was directed by Gabriel Axel.
