= List of Mexican films of 1957 =

A list of the films produced in Mexico in 1957 (see 1957 in film):

== 1957 ==
Title	Director	Cast	Genre	Notes
1957
Así era Pancho Villa	Ismael Rodríguez	Pedro Armendáriz, María Elena Marqués		
Hora y media de balazos	Alejandro Galindo	Resortes, Lucy González, José Elías Moreno, Arturo Castro, Lupe Carriles	Comedy	
The Body Snatcher	Fernando Méndez	Columba Domínguez, Crox Alvarado, Wolf Ruvinskis	Horror	
La Diana cazadora	Tito Davison	Ana Luisa Peluffo	Drama	
La dulce enemiga	Tulio Demicheli	Silvia Pinal, Joaquín Cordero	Comedy	Won two of the four Ariel Awards it was nominated for, Best Director for Davison and Best Actress for Pinal
Every Child a Cross to Bear	Juan Bustillo Oro	Esther Fernández, Demetrio González, Miguel Manzano	Drama	
Locura pasional	Tulio Demicheli	Silvia Pinal, Carlos López Moctezuma		
La mujer que no tuvo infancia	Tito Davison	Libertad Lamarque, Pedro Armendáriz		
Pablo and Carolina	Mauricio de la Serna	Pedro Infante, Irasema Dilián, Eduardo Alcaraz	Comedy	
Puss Without Boots	Fernando Cortés	Tin Tan, Martha Valdés, Marcelo Chávez	Comedy	
Tizoc	Ismael Rodriguez	Pedro Infante, María Félix		Infante won the Silver Bear for Best Actor at Berlin
Vainilla, bronce y morir	Rogelio A. Gonzalez	Elsa Aguirre, Ignacio Lopez Tarso		
The Vampire	Fernando Méndez	Germán Robles, Ariadne Welter, Carmen Montejo	Horror	
Yambao	Alfredo B. Crevenna	Ninón Sevilla, Ramón Gay, Olga Guillot		
Happiness	Alfonso Corona Blake			Entered into the 7th Berlin International Film Festival
El bolero de Raquel	Miguel M. Delgado	Cantinflas, Flor Silvestre, Manola Saavedra		
Asesinos, S.A.	Adolfo Fernández Bustamante	Adalberto Martínez, Kitty de Hoyos, Wolf Ruvinskis, Luis Aldás		
El Ratón	Chano Urueta	Raúl Macías		
El jinete sin cabeza	Chano Urueta	Luis Aguilar, Flor Silvestre, Jaime Fernández		
Here Are the Aguilares!	Jaime Salvador	Luis Aguilar, Antonio Aguilar, Rosa de Castilla, Lucy Gallardo		
La ciudad de los niños		Sara García		
La sombra del otro	Gilberto Martínez Solares	Ricardo Moreno, Marco Antonio Campos, Gaspar Henaine		
Las aventuras de Pito Pérez	Juan Bustillo Oro	Germán Valdés		
Los chiflados del rock and roll	José Díaz Morales	Luis Aguilar, Agustín Lara, Pedro Vargas		
Morir de pie	Rafael Baledón	Guillermo Cramer, Manuel Dondé, Chel López		
Poor Millionaires	Fernando Cortés	Antonio Espino, Ana Luisa Peluffo, Irma Dorantes		
The Aztec Mummy	Rafael Portillo	Ramón Gay, Rosita Arenas, Crox Alvarado, Luis Aceves Castañeda		
The Curse of the Aztec Mummy	Rafael Portillo	Ramón Gay, Rosita Arenas, Crox Alvarado		
The New World	René Cardona	Lorena Velázquez, René Cardona Jr., Rafael Alcayde		
