= Alf Hartmann =

Norwegian journalist and screenwriter (1915–2004)

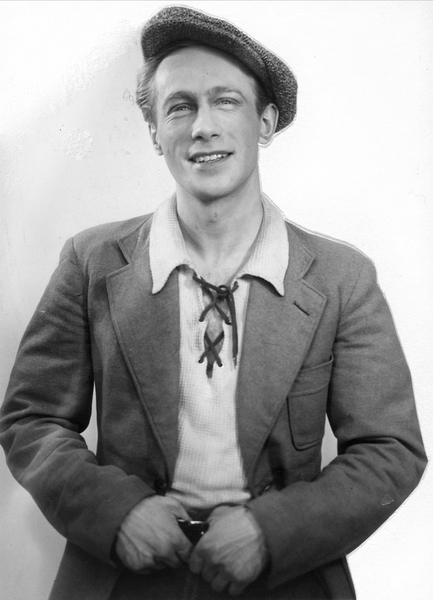
- Born: September 25, 1915; Asker, Norway
- Died: March 21, 2004 (aged 88); Oslo, Norway
- Occupations: Journalist and screenwriter
- Relatives: Christian Hartmann

Alf Simon Fougner Hartmann (September 25, 1915 – March 21, 2004) was a Norwegian journalist and screenwriter.

Hartmann was from Hvalstad near Asker, and he received his candidatus philologiæ degree in 1941. Aside from working for Morgenbladet from 1950 to 1952 in London and Dagbladet from 1952 to 1956 in Paris, Hartmann worked for Verdens Gang from 1945 onward, for which he wrote over ten thousand short articles signed Scorpio.

He wrote revue texts from 1930 onward, including for Arvid Nilssen, whom he himself discovered in a local revue in 1934. Later he wrote for Jens Book-Jenssen, Lalla Carlsen, Per Aabel, and Leif Juster, artists at Chat Noir (1946–50, 1955–) and the Edderkoppen Theater. Hartmann wrote the script for I offisielle kretser, performed at the New Theater in 1954.

== Family ==
Alf Hartmann was the son of the schoolmaster Johannes Marius Hartmann (1869–1946) and Astrid Magnus (1884–1967). His brother Christian Hartmann (1910–1985) was a composer. In 1941, Hartmann married Berit Jensen (1919–2003).
