= Eva Bergh =

Norwegian actress (1926–2013)

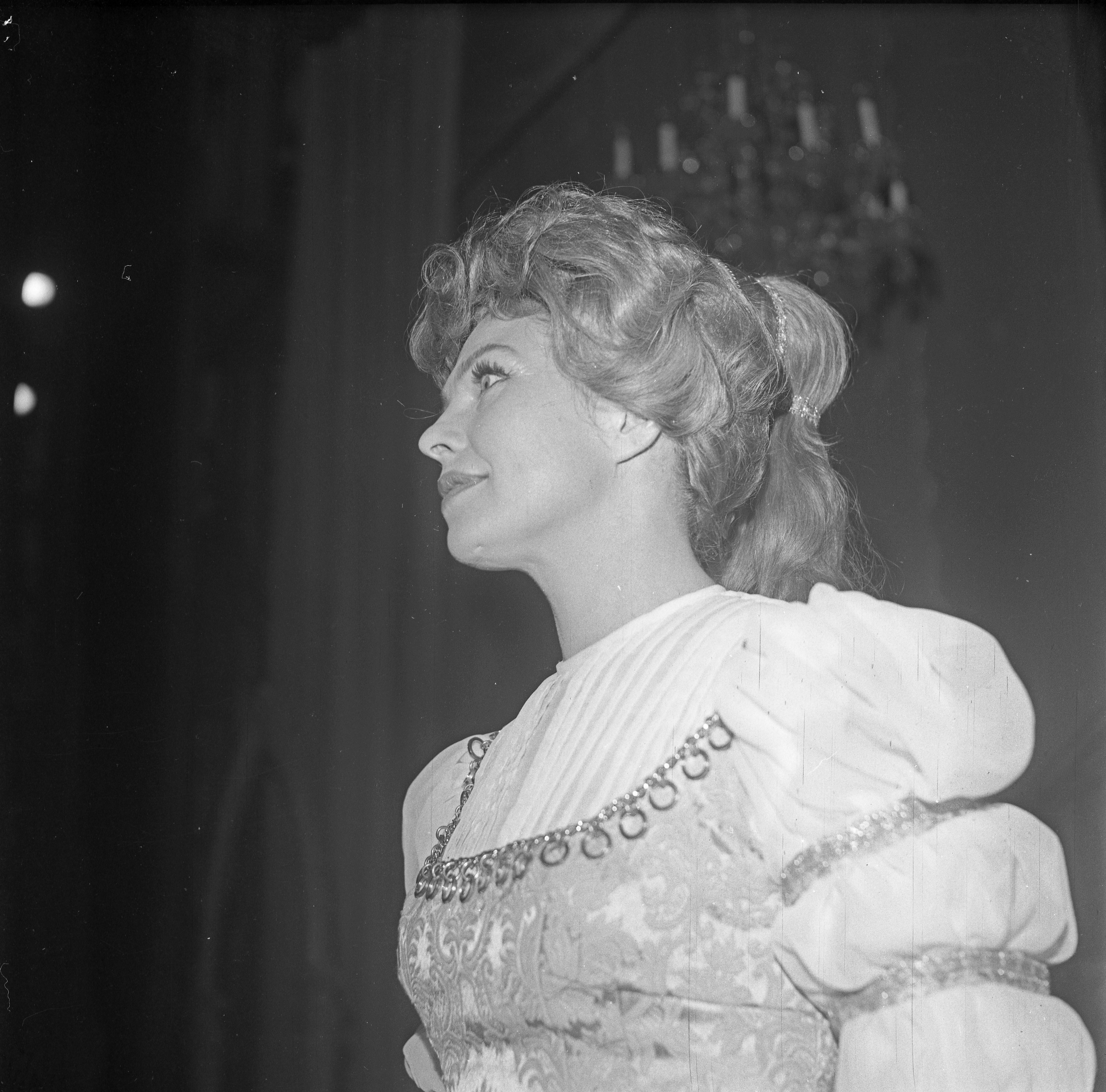
Eva Bergh as Portia in The Merchant of Venice at Den Nationale Scene 1969.

Eva Bergh (25 February 1926 – 19 February 2013) was a Norwegian actress.

Eva Bergh was born Eva Johansen at Kolbotn in Oppegård, Norway. She was married to the composer Sverre Arvid Bergh (1915–1980) and was the sister-in-law of his brother violinist and orchestral leader Øivind Bergh (1909–1987)

She made her debut at Det Nye Teater in Oslo during 1949. She held a prominent position at Den Nationale Scene in Bergen for over 40 years. She appeared in a number of roles in dramas and several major roles in plays by Ludvig Holberg and William Shakespeare. She also had a number of roles in Norwegian and foreign films. Her most notable film roles were in the British crime film The Long Memory (1953) directed by Robert Hamer and the Norwegian crime film Struggle for Eagle Peak (1960) directed by Tancred Ibsen.
