= Hjem går vi ikke =

- Directed by: Walter Fyrst
- Written by: Walter Fyrst; Eva Seeberg
- Based on: Eva Seeberg's story "En gutts dag"
- Produced by: Bjarne Stokland
- Starring: Toralv Maurstad; Kari Sundby; Eva Strøm Aastorp
- Cinematography: Per Gunnar Jonson
- Edited by: Walter Fürst
- Music by: Sverre Arvid Bergh
- Distributed by: Norsk Film A/S
- Release date: February 21, 1955
- Running time: 79 minutes
- Country: Norway
- Language: Norwegian

Hjem går vi ikke (We're Not Going Home) is a Norwegian film from 1955 directed by Walter Fyrst. It is about living conditions along the Aker River. It is based on the story "En gutts dag" (A Boy's Day) by Eva Seeberg. In addition to the film's originally planned title En gutts dag, the title Jan – en dag av en gutts liv (Jan: A Day in a Boy's Life) was also considered.

== Plot ==
The film begins with a short film about Le Corbusier's modern residential building Unité d'habitation in Marseille. Then the scene changes to a three-room apartment owned by an elderly woman played by Ella Hval. The apartment is inhabited by a three-generation family: five adults and one child. Early in the plot, the six-year-old main character Jan, played by Bjørn Olav Cook, escapes from home for a few summer weeks, together with his large St. Bernard, which the adults intend to have put down. The boy's parents are played by Eva Strøm Aastorp and Carsten Byhring. The young couple Toralv Maurstad and Kari Sundby also live in the apartment, but they want to move out. The last resident is a seamstress, played by Rønnaug Alten, who is the boy's aunt. Various cross-cuts show another couple, a car workshop owner played by Jack Fjeldstad and his girlfriend played by Ingerid Vardund. Other roles are played by Einar Vaage and Alf Malland. The young Arve Opsahl had a minor role in the film.

== Reception ==
One of the reviewers praised the beautiful scenes from the Aker River but thought the action was too rambling and that Sverre Arvid Bergh's music did little to bring rhythm to an uncertain cinematic composition. The film was aired on NRK television in 1973. The film rights were acquired by Nordisk Film in 2007.

== Cast ==
- Toralv Maurstad as Einar, a car mechanic, Bitten's fiancé
- Kari Sundby as Bitten, Marie's daughter
- Eva Strøm Aastorp as Randi, Roar's wife
- Rønnaug Alten as Marie, Roar's sister
- Carsten Byhring as Roar, the grandmother's son, a crane operator
- Bjørn Olav Cook as Jan, Roar and Randi's son
- Oscar Egede-Nissen
- Jack Fjeldstad as a car workshop owner
- Ella Hval as the grandmother
- Einar Vaage as Olsen, a caretaker
- Ingerid Vardund as the car workshop owner's girlfriend
