= Galapagos (film) =

- Directed by: Thor Heyerdahl
- Written by: Thor Heyerdahl; Per Høst
- Produced by: Per Høst
- Cinematography: Thor Heyerdahl
- Edited by: Per Høst
- Music by: Sune Waldimir
- Release date: 14 February 1955
- Running time: 78 minutes
- Country: Norway
- Language: Norwegian

Galapagos is a 1955 travel and nature documentary film made by explorer Thor Heyerdahl, showing the flora and fauna of the Galapagos archipelago.
