= Fjols til fjells =

1957 Norwegian comedy film

- Directed by: Edith Carlmar
- Written by: Otto Carlmar
- Produced by: Otto Carlmar
- Starring: Leif Juster; Unni Bernhoft; Frank Robert
- Cinematography: Sverre Bergli
- Edited by: Bjørn Breigutu
- Music by: Gunnar and Maj Sønstevold
- Release date: 1957
- Running time: 100 minutes
- Country: Norway
- Languages: Norwegian, English (few lines of dialogue)

Fjols til fjells or Fools in the Mountains is a Norwegian situation comedy film released in 1957 and based on the play «Bare jatt me'n». It is one of the most popular Norwegian films of all time. It is considered one of Edith Carlmar's best films and is one of her few forays into the comedy genre as she was known primarily for social dramas about women's issues.

== Plot ==
When two guests who look exactly alike arrive at Hurlumhei hotel, the manager Poppe, thinking they are one person, begins questioning if he's going mad. Teddy Winter is a famous suave actor while the other (an unnamed ornithologist) is a geeky professor. Soon the actor's ex-lovers, an actress named Eva Sommer and a famous model named Mona Miller, join them at the hotel adding to the confusion. The model mistakenly makes sexual advances towards the professor, and Teddy Winter is embarrassed. The actress hears of this and is also angered. Poppe is upset by all this. Meanwhile, the daughter of the hotel director disguises herself as a bellhop at the hotel to prove to her father that she's not just a spoiled child. The bellhop figures everything out and sorts out all the confusion. She marries Poppe and everything ends happily with Winter back with the actress and the ornithologist now with the model.

== Release ==
The film was released in Norwegian cinemas in summer 1957 to mixed reviews, but it was a box office success. It was re-released to cinemas ten years later, again filling theatres. It remained unreleased on home video until the '90s when it was released on VHS, followed by a remastered DVD release in 2004. In recent years it has been shown on NRK during Easter every year. It made its US TV debut on TCM on Tuesday, October 27, 2020 at 9:15 PM Eastern standard time.

== Cast and characters ==
- Poppe (played by Leif Juster), is the manager and concierge at Hurlumhei hotel, spending most of his days talking with his guests or skiing in the hills. He is confused by the two guests who look alike and believes they are the same person. His frustration works him up into a constant frenzy and even gives him nightmares. He marries Ruth at the end of the film.
- Rudolf/Ruth (played by Unni Bernhoft) is the daughter of the hotel director who disguises herself as a bellhop at the hotel to prove herself to her father. She falls in love with Poppe and marries him.
- Teddy Winter (played by Frank Robert), is a famous variety actor who arrives at the hotel, somewhat taken aback by the lack of fans there. His lookalike gets him in hot water with both his two ex-lovers.
- The Ornithologist (also played by Frank Robert), is an unnamed professor who arrives at the hotel and is mistaken by all the guests and staff for being his identical counterpart, Teddy Winter.
- Dr. Grå (played by Willie Hoel), is a doctor staying at the hotel, who sees alcohol as the best solution to most problems. He diagnoses Poppe as being crazy but soon goes mad himself when he sees the doppelgängers as well.
- Eva Sommer (played by Anne Lise Christiansen), an actress and ex-lover of Teddy Winter.
- Mona Miller (played by Anne-Lise Wang), a famous model and ex-lover of Teddy Winter. She mistakes the ornithologist for Teddy Winter.

This was also the film debut as an uncredited extra for Liv Ullmann. She appears as a hotel guest near the very beginning of the film.
