= 1957 Cannes Film Festival =

- Official poster of the 10th Cannes Film Festival
- Opening film: Around the World in 80 Days
- Location: Cannes, France
- Founded: 1946
- Awards: Palme d'Or: Friendly Persuasion
- No. of films: 31 (In Competition)
- Festival date: 2 May 1957 – 17 May 1957
- Website: festival-cannes.com/en

Cannes Film Festival
- 1958 1956

The 10th Cannes Film Festival took place from 2 to 17 May 1957. French writer André Maurois served as jury president for the main competition, while Dolores del Río was the first female member of the jury for the official selection.

The Palme d'Or, the festival's top prize, was awarded to Friendly Persuasion by William Wyler.

The festival opened with Around the World in 80 Days by Michael Anderson.

== Juries ==
=== Main Competition ===
- André Maurois, French writer - Jury President
- Jean Cocteau, French writer and filmmaker - Honorary Jury President
- Dolores del Río, Mexican actress
- Maurice Genevoix, French writer
- Georges Huisman, French historian
- Maurice Lehmann, French actor
- Marcel Pagnol, French writer and filmmaker
- Michael Powell, British filmmaker
- Jules Romains, French writer
- George Stevens, American filmmaker
- Vladimír Vlček, Czechoslovak

=== Short Films Competition ===
- Claude Aveline, French writer
- Roman Karmen, Soviet filmmaker
- Albert Lamorisse, French filmmaker
- Alberto Lattuada, Italian filmmaker
- Jean Vivie, French CST official

== Official Selection ==
=== In Competition ===
The following feature films competed for the Palme d'Or:

English title	Original title	Director(s)	Production country
The Bachelor Party		Delbert Mann	United States
Duped Till Doomsday	Betrogen bis zum jüngsten Tag	Kurt Jung-Alsen	East Germany
He Who Must Die	Celui qui doit mourir	Jules Dassin	France, Italy
The House of the Angel	La Casa del ángel	Leopoldo Torre Nilsson	Argentina
Don Quixote	Дон Кихот	Grigori Kozintsev	Soviet Union
Earth	Земя	Zahari Zhandov	Bulgaria
Faustina		José Luis Sáenz de Heredia	Spain
The Forty-First	Сорок первый	Grigory Chukhray	Soviet Union
Friendly Persuasion		William Wyler	United States
Funny Face		Stanley Donen	United States
Gotoma the Buddha		Rajbans Khanna	India
Guendalina		Alberto Lattuada	Italy
The Harvest Month	Elokuu	Matti Kassila	Finland
High Tide at Noon		Philip Leacock	United Kingdom
Kanał		Andrzej Wajda	Poland
Lapland Calendar	Same Jakki	Per Høst	Norway
Lost Children	Ztracenci	Miloš Makovec	Czechoslovakia
A Man Escaped	Un condamné à mort s'est échappé ou Le vent souffle où il veut	Robert Bresson	France
The Mill of Good Luck	La 'Moara cu noroc'	Victor Iliu	Romania
Nights of Cabiria	Le notti di Cabiria	Federico Fellini	Italy, France
Rice	米	Tadashi Imai	Japan
Qivitoq - The Mountain Hiker	Qivitoq - Fjeldgængeren	Erik Balling	Denmark
Rekava		Lester James Peries	Sri Lanka
Rose Bernd		Wolfgang Staudte	West Germany
The Seventh Seal	Det sjunde inseglet	Ingmar Bergman	Sweden
Shiroi sanmyaku		Sadao Imamura	Japan
Sissi – The Young Empress	Sissi – Die junge Kaiserin	Ernst Marischka	Austria
Two Confessions	Két vallomás	Márton Keleti	Hungary
Valley of Peace	Dolina miru	France Štiglic	Yugoslavia
Where To?	إلى أين؟	Georges Nasser	Lebanon
Yangtse Incident: The Story of H.M.S. Amethyst		Michael Anderson	United Kingdom

=== Out of Competition ===
The following film was selected to be screened out of competition:

- Around the World in 80 Days by Michael Anderson (opening film)

=== Short Films Competition ===
The following short films competed for the Short Film Palme d'Or:

- Altitude 7.546 by I. Grek
- Bolcsok by Ágoston Kollányi
- Carnival in Quebec by Jean Palardy
- City of Gold by Colin Low, Wolf Koenig
- Diario Uruguayo by Eugenio Hintz
- Die Große Wanderung by Walter Suchner
- Een leger van gehouwen steen by Theo Van Haren Noman
- Gast auf Erden by Karl Stanzl
- History of the Cinema by John Halas
- Il sogno dei gonzaga by Antonio Petrucci
- Jabulani Africa by Jok Uys, Jamie Uys
- Śląsk by Witold Lesiewicz
- La mariee portait des perles by Kurt Baum, Errol Hinds
- Let nad mocvarom (Flight Above the Marshes) by Aleksandar Petrović
- Magic of the Mountains by Mohan Dayaram Bhavnani
- Michel de ghelderode by Luc De Heusch
- Nessebar by Stephane Topaldjikov
- Niok l'éléphant by Edmond Sechan
- Ochotniki iujnikh morey (Les chasseurs des mers du sud) by S. Kogan
- Paraplícko by Bretislav Pojar
- Rembrandt, schilder van de mens by Bert Haanstra
- San Antonio de la Florida by Santos Núñez
- A Brief History (Scurtă Istorie) by Ion Popescu-Gopo
- Soseiji Gakkyu by Susumu Hani
- Splintret emalje by Johan Jacobsen
- Toute la mémoire du monde by Alain Resnais
- Vacances Tunisiennes by René Vautier
- Western Symphonie by Thomas L. Rowe
- Wiesensommer (Prairie d'été) by Heinz Sielmann

== Official Awards ==
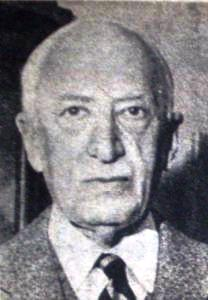
André Maurois, Jury President

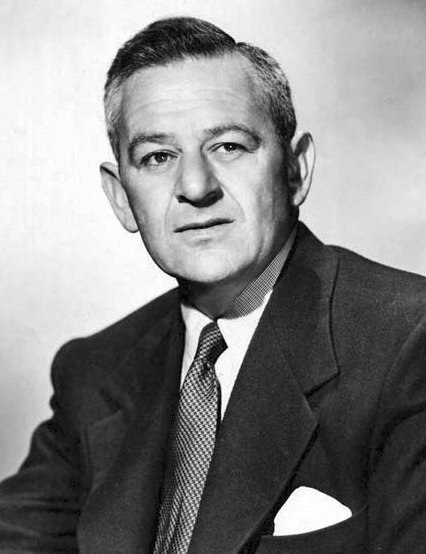
William Wyler, Palme d'Or winner

=== Main Competition ===
- Palme d'Or: Friendly Persuasion by William Wyler
- Jury Special Prize:
  - Kanał by Andrzej Wajda
  - The Seventh Seal by Ingmar Bergman
- Best Director: Robert Bresson for A Man Escaped
- Best Actress: Giulietta Masina for Nights of Cabiria
  - Special Mention: Elsa Daniel for La casa del ángel
- Best Actor: John Kitzmiller for Valley of Peace
- Special Mentions: Gotoma the Buddha by Rajbans Khanna
- Special Award:
  - The Forty-first by Grigori Chukhrai
  - Shiroi sanmyaku by Sadao Imamura
  - Qivitoq by Erik Balling

=== Short Films Competition ===
- Short Film Palme d'Or: A Brief History by Ion Popescu-Gopo
- Special mention: Ochotniki iujnikh morey (Les chasseurs des mers du sud) by S. Kogan
- Documentary Prize: City of Gold by Colin Low, Wolf Koenig
- Prize for Film in Nature: Wiesensommer by Heinz Sielmann

== Independent Awards ==
=== OCIC Award ===
- Special Mention:
  - He Who Must Die by Jules Dassin
  - Nights of Cabiria by Federico Fellini
