= Manola Saavedra =

Mexican actress (1936–2012)

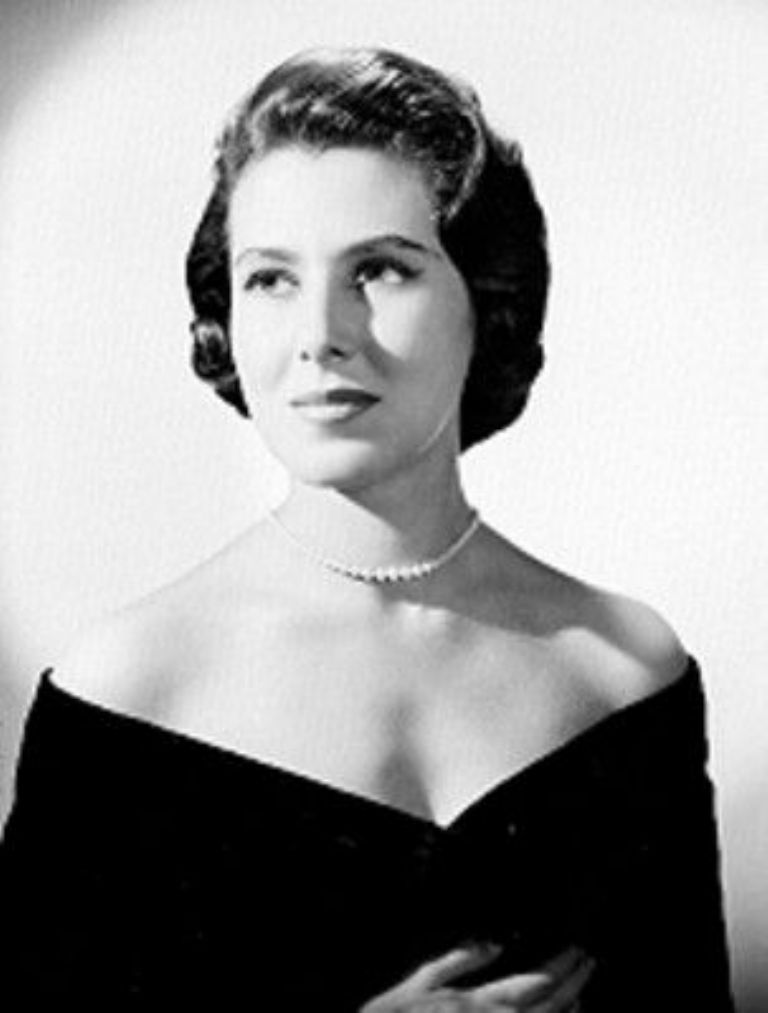
- Saavedra c. 1957
- Born: Manuela Saavedra Moreno; 29 June 1936; Valencia, Valencian Community, Spanish Republic
- Died: 25 August 2012 (aged 76); Acapulco, Guerrero, Mexico
- Occupation: Actress
- Years active: 1957–?
- Spouse: Fabián Aldama Chávez (m. 1962)
- Children: 3

Manuela "Manola" Saavedra Moreno (29 June 1936 – 25 August 2012) was a Spanish-born Mexican film and television actress, perhaps best known for her debut film role in El bolero de Raquel (1957).

== Selected filmography ==
- El bolero de Raquel (1957) – Raquel
