= The Tough =

1957 film

- Directed by: Salah Abu Seif
- Written by: Salah Abu Seif; Naguib Mahfouz
- Starring: Farid Shawqi
- Cinematography: Wadid Sirry
- Release date: 1957
- Country: Egypt
- Language: Arabic

The Tough (Arabic: الفتوة [elfeˈtew.wæ]) is a 1957 Egyptian film directed by Salah Abouseif. It was entered into the 7th Berlin International Film Festival.

== Cast ==
- Farid Shawqi
- Taheya Cariocca
- Zaki Rostom
- Tewfik El-Dekn
- Mimi Shakeeb
- Fakher Fakher
- Mahmoud El-Sabbaa
- Hassan el Baroudi
- Mohamed Reda
- Abdel Alim Khattab
- Hoda Soltan
- Mahmoud El-Meliguy
