= Lapland Calendar =

1957 film

- Directed by: Per Høst; Anders Pentha
- Written by: Per Høst
- Produced by: Per Høst
- Release date: 21 March 1957
- Running time: 100 minutes
- Country: Norway
- Language: Norwegian

Lapland Calendar (Norwegian: Same Jakki) is a 1957 Norwegian documentary film directed by Per Høst. It was entered into the 1957 Cannes Film Festival.

== Plot ==
A documentary about the Sami, a population from northern Scandinavia.

== Cast ==
- Karen Anna Logje - Rauna
- Klemet Veimel - Nilas
- Matti Mikkel Sara - Matti
- Jon Luoso - Heika
