= Per Høst =

Norwegian zoologist, film producer and writer (1907–1971)

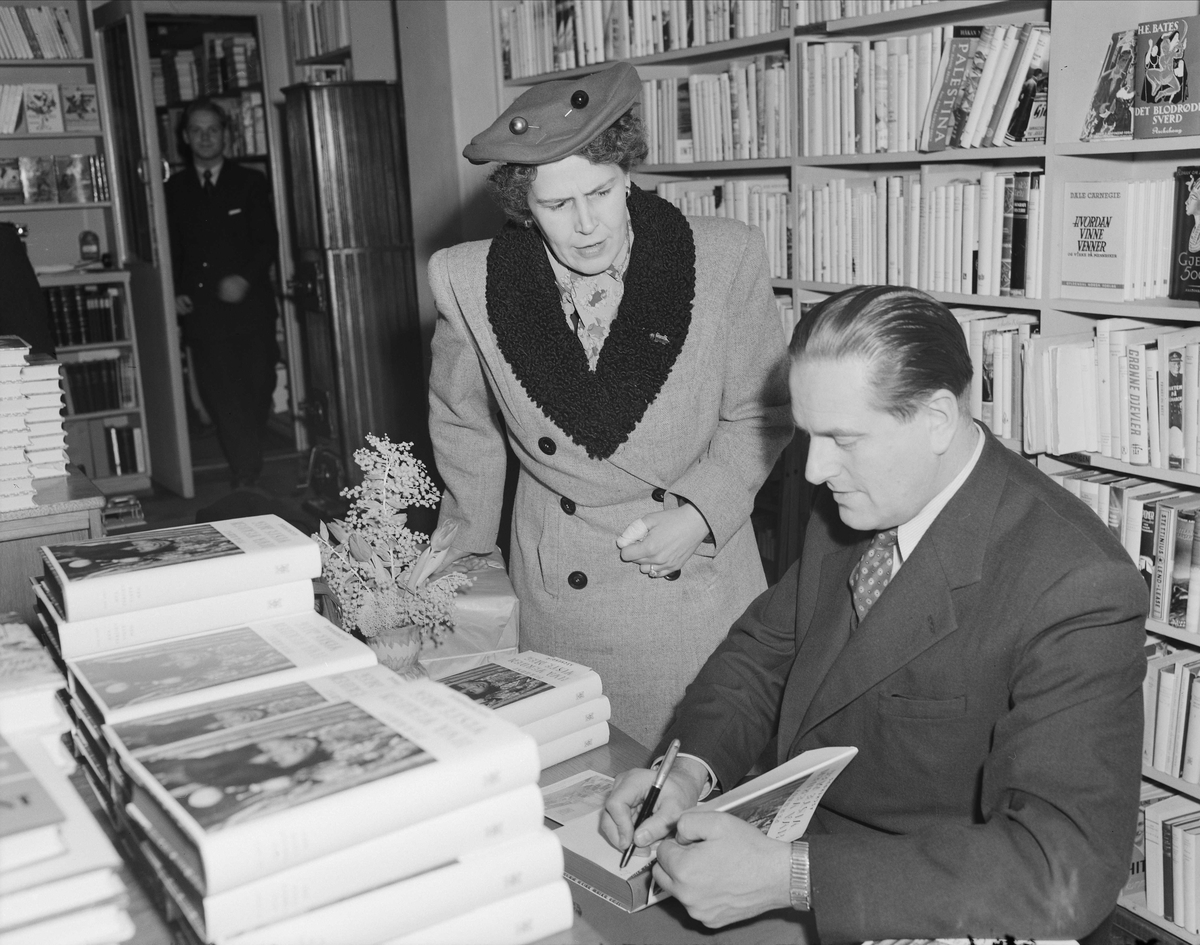
- Per Høst signing one of his books in 1951
- Born: 5 December 1907; Kristiania, Norway
- Died: 28 December 1971 (aged 64)
- Occupations: Zoologist; Film producer Non-fiction writer.
- Notable work: Galapagos (1955); Same-Jakki (1957)
- Relatives: Ernst Rolf (father-in-law)

Per Høst (5 December 1907 – 28 December 1971) was a Norwegian zoologist, film producer and non-fiction writer known for his wildlife and ethnographic documentaries. After studying zoology at the University of Oslo and conducting research on Arctic wildlife, he shifted to filmmaking in the 1930s, producing educational nature shorts before creating feature-length documentaries. His work included Gjensyn med jungelfolket (1950) about the Chocó people of Panama and Same Jakki (1957), which documented Sámi reindeer herders in northern Norway and was selected for the Cannes Film Festival. Throughout his career, Høst produced content for schools, industry, the BBC, and the NRK, combining his scientific background with documentary filmmaking techniques that captured both natural environments and indigenous cultures.

== Early life and education ==
Per Høst was born in Kristiania to Hans Andreas Høst (1874–1944) and Ragna Julie Pedersen Svenneby (1872–1959), and grew up in Stabekk. After finishing secondary school at Stabekk Upper Secondary School in 1927, he studied zoology at the University of Oslo from 1927 to 1931. While still a student he joined several Arctic expeditions to study seals and carried out pioneering research on reproduction, moult and plumage shedding in ptarmigan birds—a project that promised a distinguished academic career before he turned to film.

== Personal life ==
Høst was married to Rita Thornborg from 1941 to 1948, and to Ann Mari Strugstad Rolf (daughter of entertainer Ernst Rolf) from 1951 to 1960. His brother was the classical philologist Haakon Høst.

== Career ==
Høst's transition from academic zoologist to filmmaker began in 1934, when he was 27. Using a 16-mm camera and raw film stock borrowed from his brother‑in‑law, he shot the short film Hva turister aldri ser ('What tourists never see'), documenting Arctic foxes on Hardangervidda alongside public lectures. The industrialist Johan H. Andresen Jr. financed a further 22 three‑minute commissioned nature films—each punctuated by brief tobacco‑product placements—that Høst described as his "film school", since they taught him the practical skills of editing, lighting and sound recording.

In 1937 he released his first feature‑length documentary, Fra det arktiske dyrelivs eventyrverden ('From the adventure world of Arctic wildlife'), an 80‑minute silent film for which he provided live narration during a nationwide touring programme. After World War II, Høst combined lecture tours at home and abroad with several successful educational and promotional films for schools and industry.

His international breakthrough came with Gjensyn med jungelfolket ('Reunion with the jungle people') (1950), a colour documentary about the Chocó people of Panama that outshone Thor Heyerdahl's well-known Kon‑Tiki in Norwegian cinemas. Throughout the 1950s he also produced television documentaries for both the British Broadcasting Corporation and the Norwegian Broadcasting Corporation.

=== Major works ===
Høst's magnum opus, Same Jakki (1957), chronicles a year in the life of Sami reindeer herders in northern Norway, blending observational footage with staged sequences. Selected for competition at the Cannes Film Festival, it won several international awards—but its high budget and the requirement to repay public grants left Høst bankrupt in 1960. That same year he divorced his second wife.

Despite declining health, he continued to produce shorter films for NRK and, at David Attenborough's invitation, television programmes for the BBC in the late 1950s. His final feature, Same Ællin (1971), took a more overtly political stance on Sami rights. Per Høst died later that year, aged 64.
