= Edith Carlmar =

Norwegian actress and director (1911–2003)

- Born: Edith Mary Johanne Mathiesen; 15 November 1911; Christiania, Norway
- Died: 17 May 2003 (aged 91); Oslo, Norway
- Resting place: Oslo Western Civil Cemetery
- Occupations: Actress and film director

Edith Carlmar (born Edith Mary Johanne Mathiesen; 15 November 1911 – 17 May 2003) was a Norwegian actress and Norway's first female film director. She is known for films such as Aldri annet enn bråk (1954), Fjols til fjells (1957), and Ung flukt (The Wayward Girl, 1959). Her 1949 film, Døden er et kjærtegn (Death is a Caress), is considered to be Norway's first film noir. The last film she directed, Ung flukt, introduced Liv Ullmann, Norway's most famous actor internationally, to the silver screen.

Carlmar came from a poor family in the working class districts of East Oslo. However, she did manage to take dancing classes and made her debut on stage at the age of 15. In the theater she met Otto Carlmar whom she married three years later. From 1936 she worked as an actress in various theatres. Here she met the film director Tancred Ibsen who introduced her to the world of cinema.

In 1949 she and her husband started Carlmar Film A/S, and began writing scripts, directing and producing films. They made ten feature films over a ten-year period. After a decade of film-making Carlmar retired as a director. In the last part of her life she accepted only minor acting roles in plays and movies. Carlmar's films often tackled such social issues as abortion, drug addiction, mental illness and out of wedlock births. Her films often pushed the boundaries of censorship at that time.

== Filmography ==
=== Actress ===
- Vigdis (1943)
- Den hemmelighetsfulle leiligheten (1948)
- Jentespranget (Lina's Wedding) (1973)

=== Director ===
- Døden er et kjærtegn (1949)
- Skadeskutt (1951)
- Ung frue forsvunnet (1953)
- Aldri annet enn bråk (1954)
- Bedre enn sitt rykte (1955)
- På solsiden (1956)
- Slalåm under himmelen (1957)
- Fjols til fjells (1957)
- Lån meg din kone (1958)
- Ung flukt (The Wayward Girl) (1959)

=== Director shorts ===
- Bak kulissene
- Kirker i Oslo
- Langåra - et sommerparadis on YouTube, published by the City Archive of Oslo * Oslo bymuseum
- Vann og kloakk on YouTube, published by the City Archive of Oslo
