= Otto Carlmar =

Norwegian film producer, writer and actor

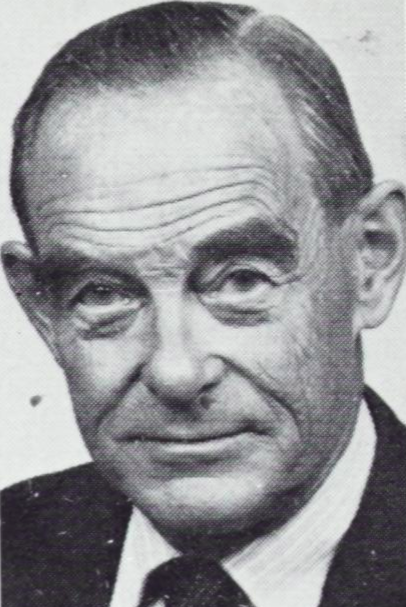
- Spouse(s): Edith Carlmar

Otto Carlmar (14 August 1902 – 20 May 1987) was a Norwegian film producer, writer and actor, most active during the 1950s. He began as a stage director and writer, and co-founded Carlmar Film in 1949 with his wife, film director Edith Carlmar. He produced and wrote nine feature films directed by his wife. From 1963 to 1965 he was the president of Norsk Film.
