= Ingrid Bergman =

Swedish actress (1915–1982)

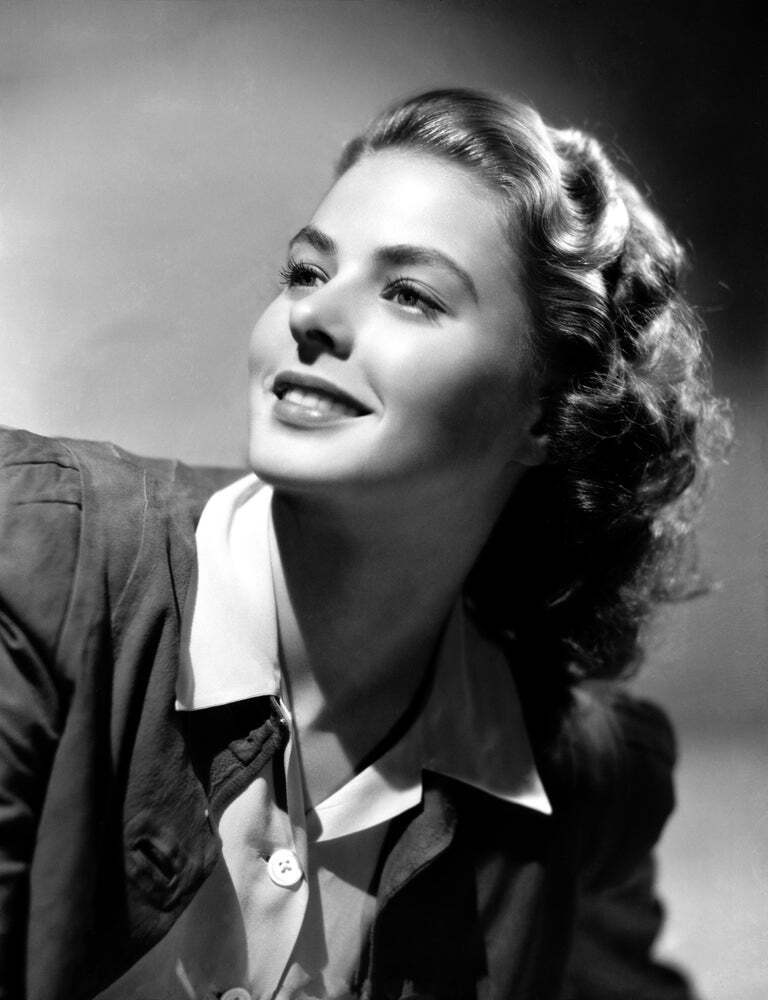
- Bergman in 1940
- Born: 29 August 1915; Stockholm, Sweden
- Died: 29 August 1982 (aged 67); London, England
- Resting place: Norra Begravningsplatsen, Stockholm
- Occupation: Actress
- Years active: 1932–1982
- Spouses: Petter Lindström (m. 1937; div. 1950) Roberto Rossellini (m. 1950; div. 1957) Lars Schmidt (m. 1958; div. 1975)
- Children: 4, including Pia Lindström, Isabella Rossellini and Isotta Ingrid Rossellini
- Awards: Full list

Ingrid Bergman (Note: Swedish: [ˈɪ̌ŋːrɪd ˈbæ̌rjman]) (29 August 1915 – 29 August 1982) was a Swedish actress with a career spanning five decades, Bergman is often regarded as one of the most influential actresses in the history of cinema. She won numerous accolades, including three Academy Awards, two Primetime Emmy Awards, and a Tony Award; which made her the youngest performer to achieve the Triple Crown of Acting and one of four actresses to have received at least three acting Academy Awards.

Born in Stockholm to a Swedish father and German mother, Bergman began her acting career in Swedish and German films. Her introduction to the U.S. audience came in the English-language remake of Intermezzo (1939). Known for her naturally luminous beauty, she starred in Casablanca (1942) as Ilsa Lund. Bergman's notable performances in the 1940s include the dramas For Whom the Bell Tolls (1943), Gaslight (1944), The Bells of St. Mary's (1945), and Joan of Arc (1948), all of which earned her nominations for the Academy Award for Best Actress; she won for Gaslight. She made three films with Alfred Hitchcock: Spellbound (1945), Notorious (1946), and Under Capricorn (1949).

In 1950, she starred in Roberto Rossellini's Stromboli, released after the revelation that she was having an affair with Rossellini; that and her pregnancy before their marriage created a scandal in the U.S. that prompted her to remain in Europe for several years. During this time, she starred in Rossellini's Europa '51 (1952) and Journey to Italy (1954), the former of which won her the Volpi Cup for Best Actress. The Volpi Cup was not awarded to her in 1952 because she was dubbed (by Lydia Simoneschi) in the version presented at the Festival; she was awarded posthumously in 1992, and the prize was accepted by her son Roberto Rossellini. She returned to Hollywood, earning two more Academy Awards for her roles in Anastasia (1956) and Murder on the Orient Express (1974). During this period she also starred in Indiscreet (1958), Cactus Flower (1969), and Autumn Sonata (1978) receiving her sixth Best Actress nomination.

Bergman won the Tony Award for Best Actress in a Play for the Maxwell Anderson play Joan of Lorraine (1947). She also won two Primetime Emmy Awards for Outstanding Lead Actress in a Limited Series or Movie for The Turn of the Screw (1960), and A Woman Called Golda (1982). In 1974, Bergman discovered she had breast cancer and continued to work until shortly before her death on her sixty-seventh birthday in 1982. Bergman spoke five languages—Swedish, English, German, Italian, and French—and acted in each. In 1999, the American Film Institute recognized her as the fourth-greatest female screen legend of Classic Hollywood Cinema.

== Early life ==
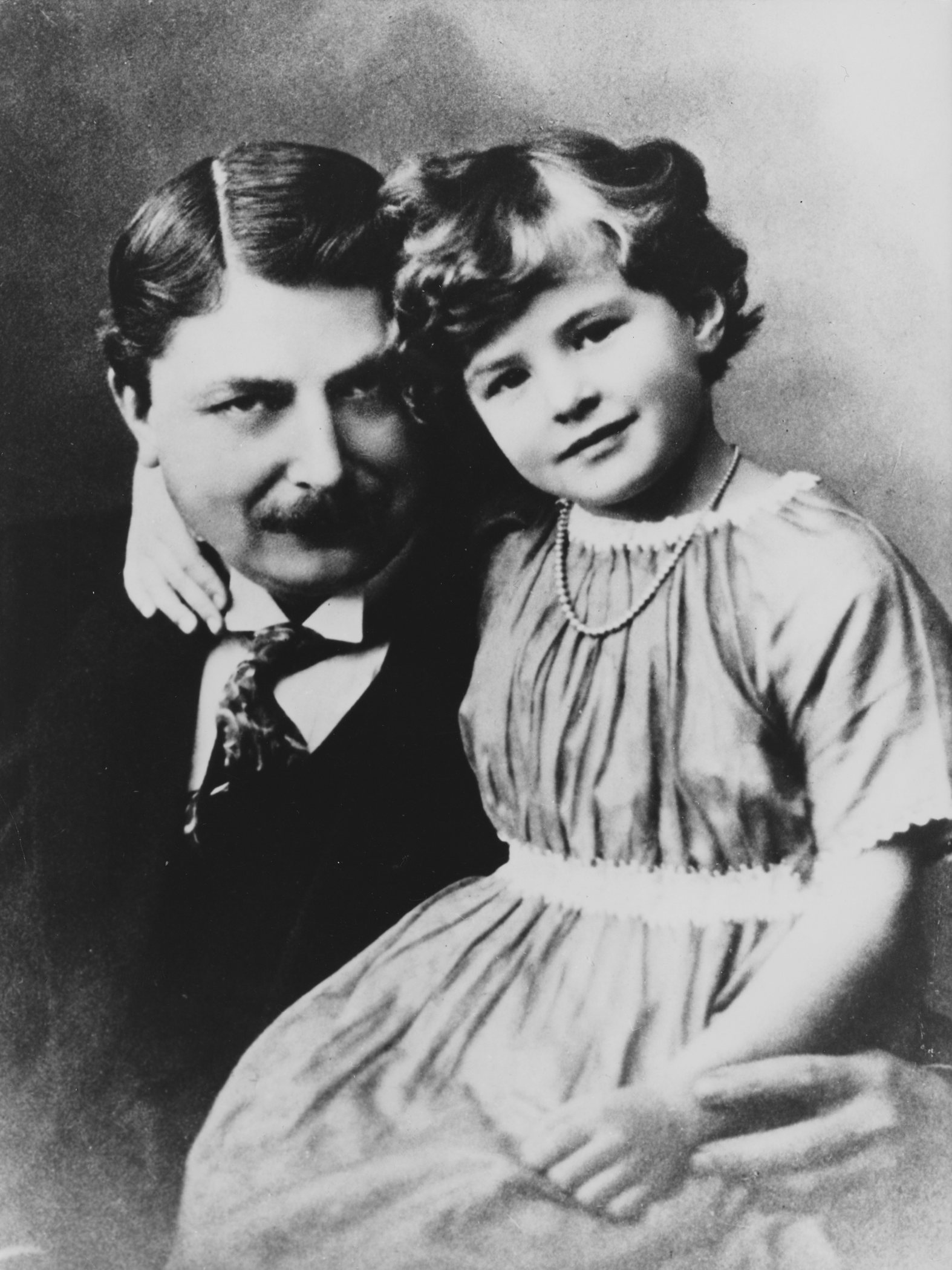
Six-year-old Bergman with her father, Justus

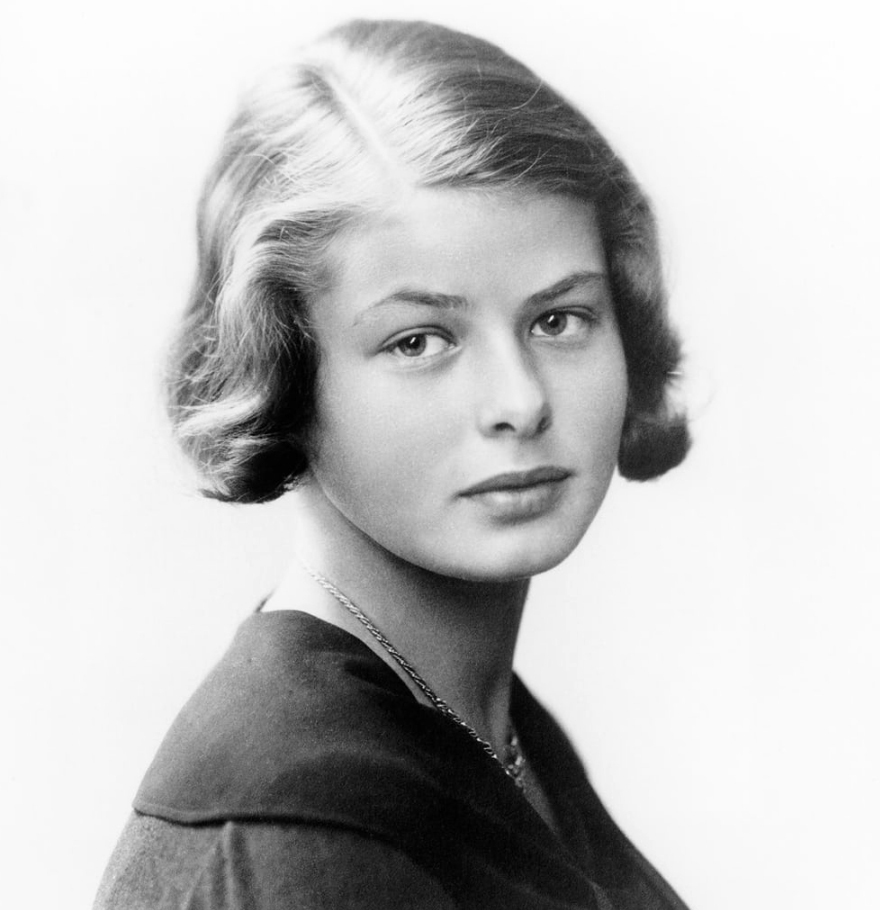
Bergman at around the age of 14. The self-portrait was taken with camera equipment inherited from her father.

Ingrid Bergman was born on 29 August 1915 in Stockholm, to a Swedish father, Justus Samuel Bergman, and a German mother, Frieda "Friedel" Henriette Auguste Louise Bergman (née Adler), who was born in Kiel. Her parents married in Hamburg on 13 June 1907. She was named after Princess Ingrid of Sweden. Although she was raised in Sweden, she spent her summers in Germany and spoke fluent German.

Bergman was raised as an only child, as two older siblings had died in infancy before she was born. When she was two and a half years old, her mother died. She learned to create imaginary friends as a child. Justus Bergman had wanted his daughter to become an opera star and had her take voice lessons for three years. He sent her to the Palmgrenska Samskolan, a prestigious girls' school in Stockholm where Bergman was reportedly neither a good student nor popular.

Justus was a photographer and loved documenting his daughter's birthdays with his camera. He made his daughter one of his favorite photographic subjects. She enjoyed dancing, dressing up, and acting in front of her father's lenses. "I was perhaps the most photographed child in Scandinavia," quipped Bergman in her later years. In 1929, when Bergman was around 14, her father died of stomach cancer. Losing her parents at such a young age was a trauma that Bergman later described as "living with an ache", an experience of which she was not even aware.

After her father's death, Bergman was sent to live with her paternal aunt, Ellen, who died of heart disease six months later. Bergman then lived with her paternal uncle Otto and his wife Hulda, who had five children of their own. She also visited her maternal aunt, Elsa Adler, whom the young girl called Mutti (Mom) according to family lore. She later said, "I have wanted to be an actress almost as long as I can remember", sometimes wearing her deceased mother's clothing, and staging plays in her father's empty studio.

Bergman spoke Swedish and German as first languages, English and Italian (acquired later, while living in the U.S. and Italy), and French (learned in school). She acted in each of these languages at various times.

Bergman received a scholarship to the state-sponsored Royal Dramatic Training Academy, where Greta Garbo had some years earlier earned a similar scholarship. After several months, she was given a part in a new play, Ett Brott (A Crime), written by Sigfrid Siwertz. This was "totally against procedure" at the school, where girls were expected to complete three years of study before getting such acting roles. During her first summer break, Bergman was hired by Swedish film studio Svensk Filmindustri, which led her to leave the Royal Dramatic Theatre after just one year to work in films full-time.

== Career ==
=== 1935–1938: Swedish years ===
Bergman's first film experience was as an extra in the 1932 film Landskamp, an experience she described as "walking on holy ground". Her first speaking role was a small part in Munkbrogreven (1935). Bergman played Elsa, a maid in a seedy hotel, being pursued by the leading man, Edvin Adolphson. Critics called her "hefty and sure of herself", and "somewhat overweight ... with an unusual way of speaking her lines". The unflatteringly striped costume that she wore may have contributed to the unfavorable comments regarding her appearance. Soon after Munkbrogreven, Bergman was offered a studio contract and placed under director Gustaf Molander.

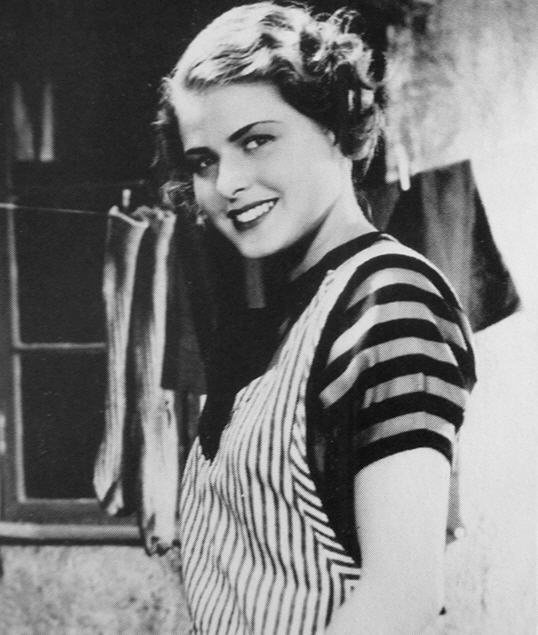
Bergman as Elsa in Munkbrogreven (1935)

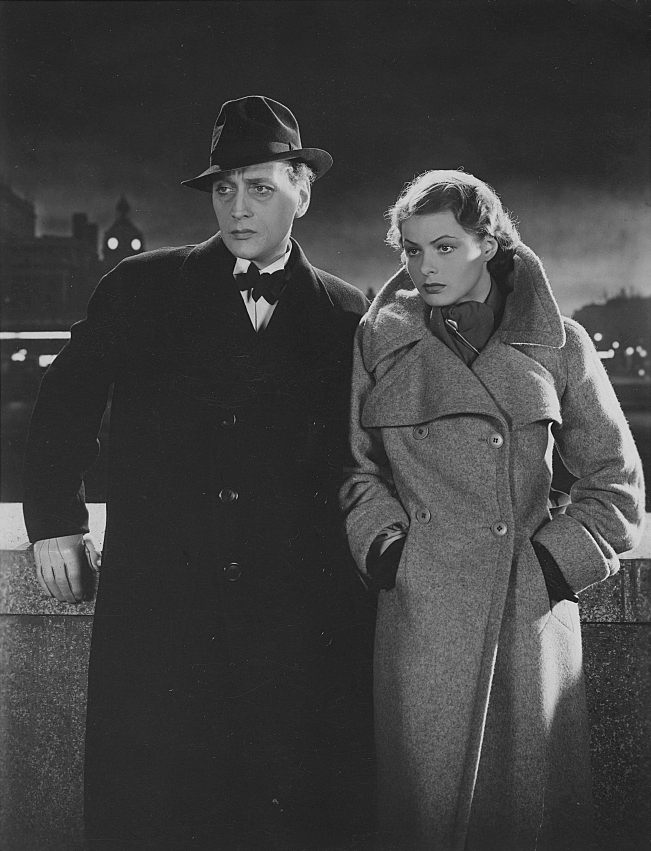
Bergman with Gösta Ekman in Intermezzo (1936)

Bergman starred in Ocean Breakers, in which she played a fisherman's daughter, and then in Swedenhielms, where she had the opportunity to work alongside her idol Gösta Ekman. Next, she starred in Walpurgis Night (1935). She played Lena, a secretary in love with her boss, Johan, who is unhappily married. Throughout, Lena and the wife vie for Johan's affection, with the wife losing her husband to Lena at the end.

In 1936, in On the Sunny Side (På Solsidan), Bergman was cast as an orphan from a good family who marries a rich older gentleman. Also in 1936, she appeared in Intermezzo, her first lead performance, where she was reunited with Gösta Ekman. This was a pivotal film for the young actress and allowed her to demonstrate her talent. Director Molander later said: "I created Intermezzo for her, but I was not responsible for its success. Ingrid herself made it successful." In 1938, she starred in Only One Night, playing an upper-class woman living on a country estate. She didn't like the part, calling it "a piece of rubbish". She only agreed to appear if only she could star in the studio's next film project, En kvinnas ansikte. She later acted in Dollar (1938), a Scandinavian screwball comedy. Bergman had just been voted Sweden's most admired movie star in the previous year and received top billing. Svenska Dagbladet wrote in its review: "Ingrid Bergman's feline appearance as an industrial tycoon's wife overshadows them all."

In her next film, a role created especially for her, En kvinnas ansikte (A Woman's Face), she played against her usual casting, as a bitter, unsympathetic character, whose face had been hideously burned. Anna Holm is the leader of a blackmail gang that targets the wealthy folk of Stockholm for their money and jewellery. The film required Bergman to wear heavy make-up, as well as glue, to simulate a burned face. A brace was put in place to distort the shape of one cheek. In her diary, she called the film "my own picture, my very own. I have fought for it." The critics loved her performance, citing her as an actor of great talent and confidence. The film was awarded a Special Recommendation at the 1938 Venice Film Festival, for its "overall artistic contribution". It was remade in 1941 by Metro-Goldwyn-Mayer with the same title, starring Joan Crawford.

Bergman signed a three-picture contract with UFA, the German major film company, although she only made one picture. At the time, she was pregnant, but, nonetheless, she arrived in Berlin to begin filming The Four Companions (Die vier Gesellen) (1938), directed by Carl Froelich. The film was intended as a star vehicle to launch Bergman's career in Germany. In the film, she played one of four ambitious young women, attempting to set up a graphic design agency. The film was a light-hearted combination of comedy and romance. At first, she did not comprehend the political and social situation in Germany. Later, she said: "I saw very quickly that if you were anybody at all in films, you had to be a member of the Nazi party." By September, she was back in Sweden, and gave birth to her daughter, Pia. She was never to work in Germany again.

Bergman appeared in eleven films in her native Sweden before the age of twenty-five. Her characters were always plagued with uncertainty, fear, and anxiety. The early Swedish films were not masterpieces, but she worked with some of the biggest talents in the Swedish film industry, such as Gösta Ekman, Karin Swanström, Victor Sjöström, and Lars Hanson. It showcased her immense acting talent, as a young woman with a bright future ahead of her.

=== 1939–1949: Hollywood and stage work breakthrough ===
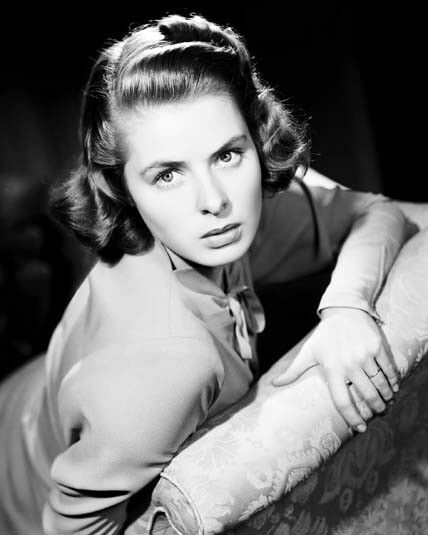
Bergman in 1941

Bergman's first acting role in the United States was in Intermezzo: A Love Story by Gregory Ratoff which premiered on 22 September 1939. She accepted the invitation of Hollywood producer David O. Selznick, who wished her to star in the English-language remake of her earlier Swedish film Intermezzo (1936). Unable to speak English, and uncertain about her acceptance by the American audience, she expected to complete this one film and return home to Sweden. Her husband, Petter Aron Lindström, remained in Sweden with their daughter Pia (born 1938). In Intermezzo, she played the role of a young piano accompanist, opposite Leslie Howard, who played a famous violin virtuoso. Bergman arrived in Los Angeles on 6 May 1939 and stayed at the Selznick home until she could find another residence.

According to Selznick's son Danny, who was a child at the time, his father had concerns about Bergman: "She didn't speak English, she was too tall, her name sounded too German, and her eyebrows were too thick". Bergman was soon accepted without having to modify her looks or name, despite some early suggestions by Selznick. "He let her have her way", notes a story in Life magazine. Selznick understood her fear of Hollywood make-up artists, who might turn her into someone she wouldn't recognize, and "instructed them to lay off". He was also aware that her natural good looks would compete successfully with Hollywood's "synthetic razzle-dazzle".

During the following weeks, while Intermezzo was being filmed, Selznick was also filming Gone with the Wind. In a letter to William Hebert, his publicity director, Selznick described a few of his early impressions of Bergman:

Miss Bergman is the most completely conscientious actress with whom I have ever worked, in that she thinks of absolutely nothing but her work before and during the time she is doing a picture ... She practically never leaves the studio, and even suggested that her dressing room be equipped so that she could live here during the picture. She never for a minute suggests quitting at six o'clock or anything of the kind ... Because of having four stars acting in Gone with the Wind, our star dressing-room suites were all occupied and we had to assign her a smaller suite. She went into ecstasies over it and said she had never had such a suite in her life ... All of this is completely unaffected and completely unique and I should think would make a grand angle of approach to her publicity ... so that her natural sweetness and consideration and conscientiousness become something of a legend ... and is completely in keeping with the fresh and pure personality and appearance which caused me to sign her.

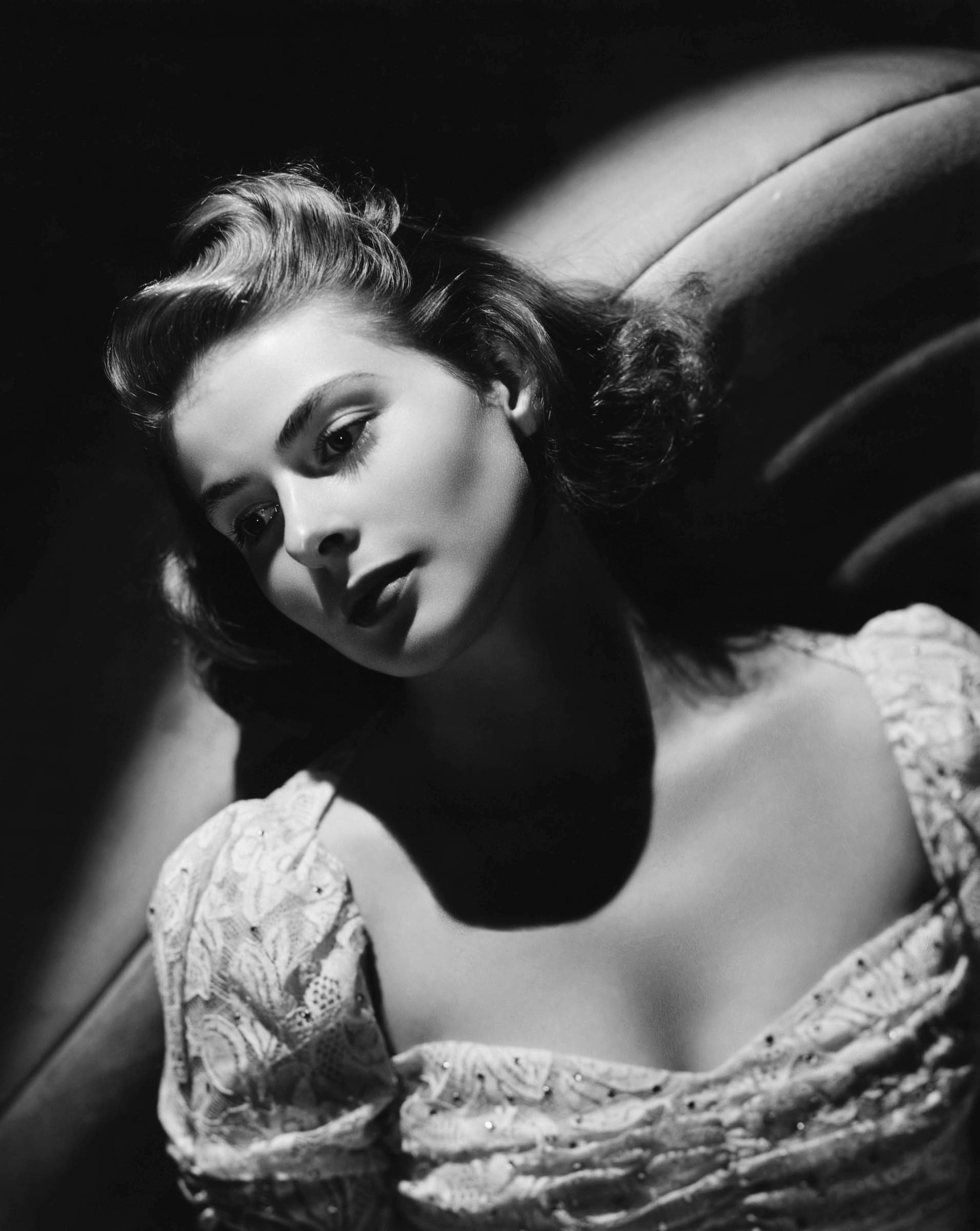
Bergman in 1939

Intermezzo became an enormous success and as a result, Bergman became a star. Life reported in a biographical profile that Ratoff had described her as "sensational", and that this was the "sentiment of the entire set", adding that "workmen went out of their way to do things for her", and that the cast and crew "admired the quick, alert concentration she gave to direction and to her lines". Film historian David Thomson notes that this became "the start of an astonishing impact on Hollywood and America", where her lack of make-up contributed to an "air of nobility". According to Life, the impression that she left on Hollywood, after she returned to Sweden, was of a tall girl "with light brown hair and blue eyes who was painfully shy, but friendly, with a warm, straight, quick smile".

Selznick appreciated her uniqueness. Bergman was hailed as a fine new talent, and received many positive reviews. The New York Times noted her "freshness and simplicity and natural dignity" and the maturity of her acting which was nonetheless, free of "stylistic traits—the mannerisms, postures, precise inflections—that become the stock in trade of the matured actress". Variety noted that she was warm and convincing, and provided an "arresting performance" and that her "charm, sincerity" ...and "infectious vivaciousness" would "serve her well in both comedy and drama". There was also recognition of her natural appearance, in contrast to other film actresses. The New York Tribune critic wrote: "Using scarcely any make-up, but playing with mobile intensity, she creates the character so vividly and credibly that it becomes the core of [the] narrative." Bergman made her stage debut in 1940 with Liliom opposite Burgess Meredith, at a time when she was still learning English. Selznick was worried that his new starlet's value would diminish if she received bad reviews. Brooks Atkinson of The New York Times said that Bergman seemed at ease, and commanded the stage that evening. That same year she starred in June Night (Juninatten), a Swedish language drama film directed by Per Lindberg. She plays Kerstin, a woman who has been shot by her lover. The news reaches the national papers. Kerstin moves to Stockholm under the new name of Sara, but lives under the scrutiny and watchful eye of her new community. Öresunds-Posten wrote, "Bergman establishes herself as an actress belonging to the world elite."

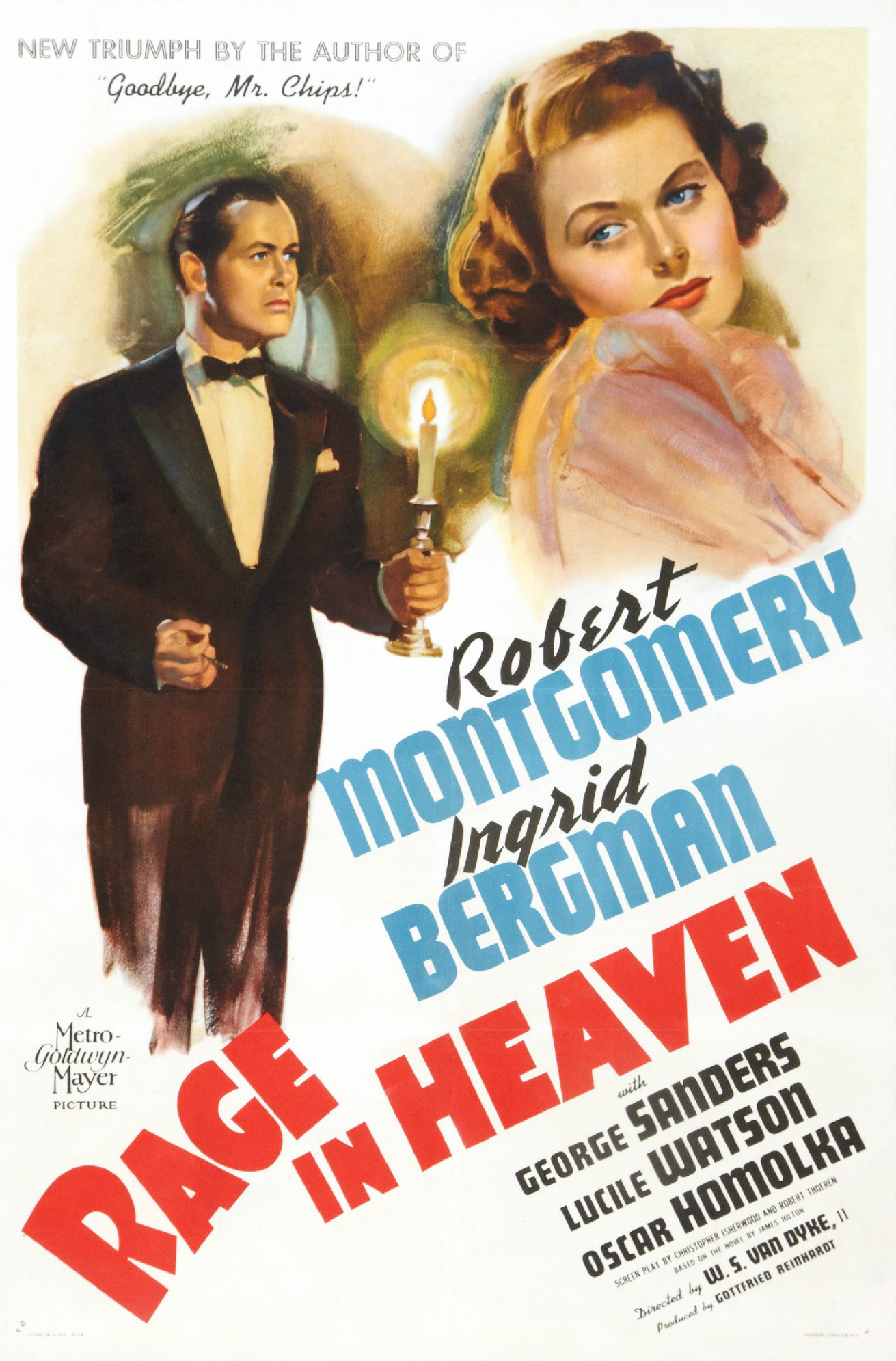
Rage in Heaven (1941) poster with Bergman, Robert Montgomery, and George Sanders

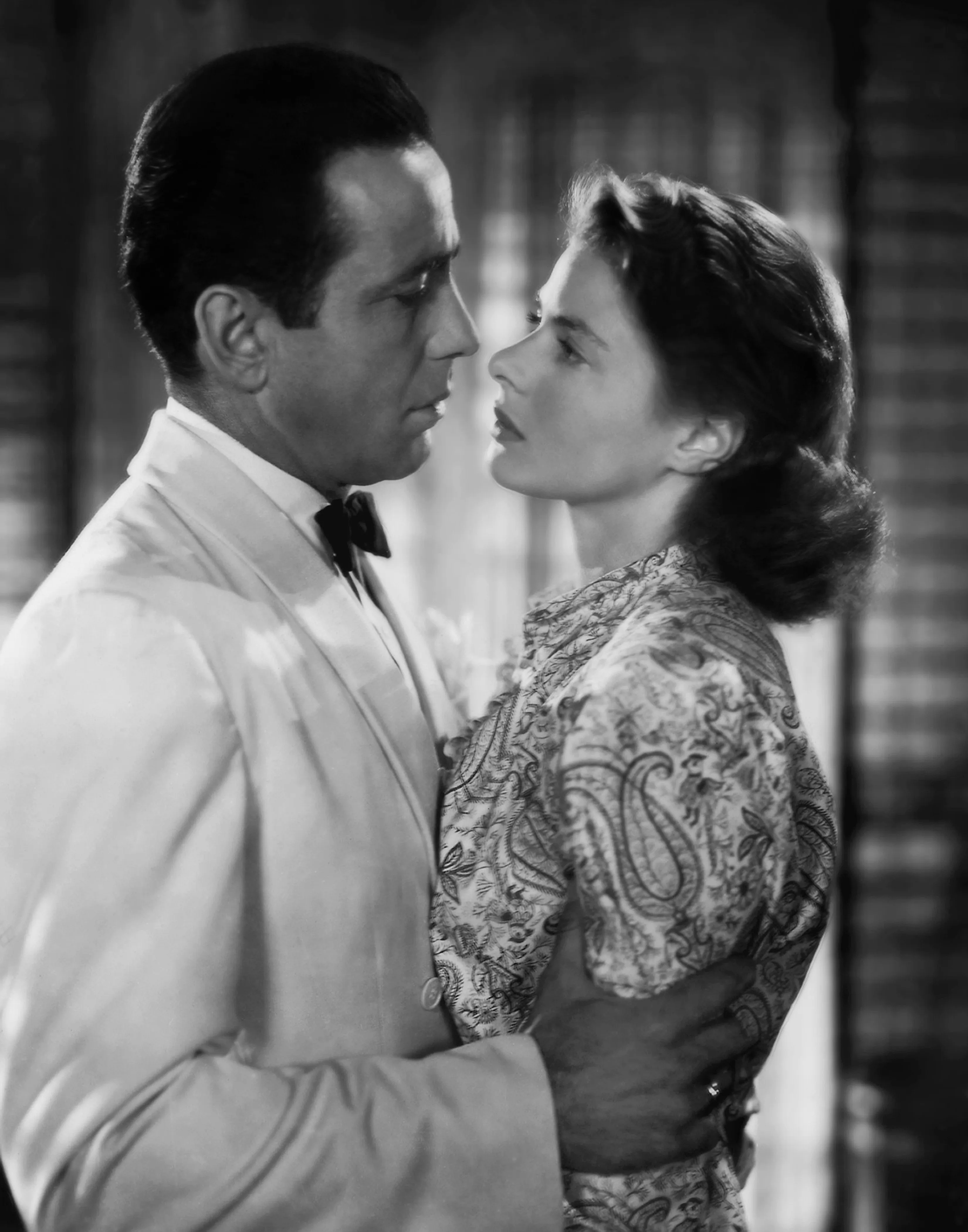
Bogart and Bergman as lovers in Casablanca (1942)

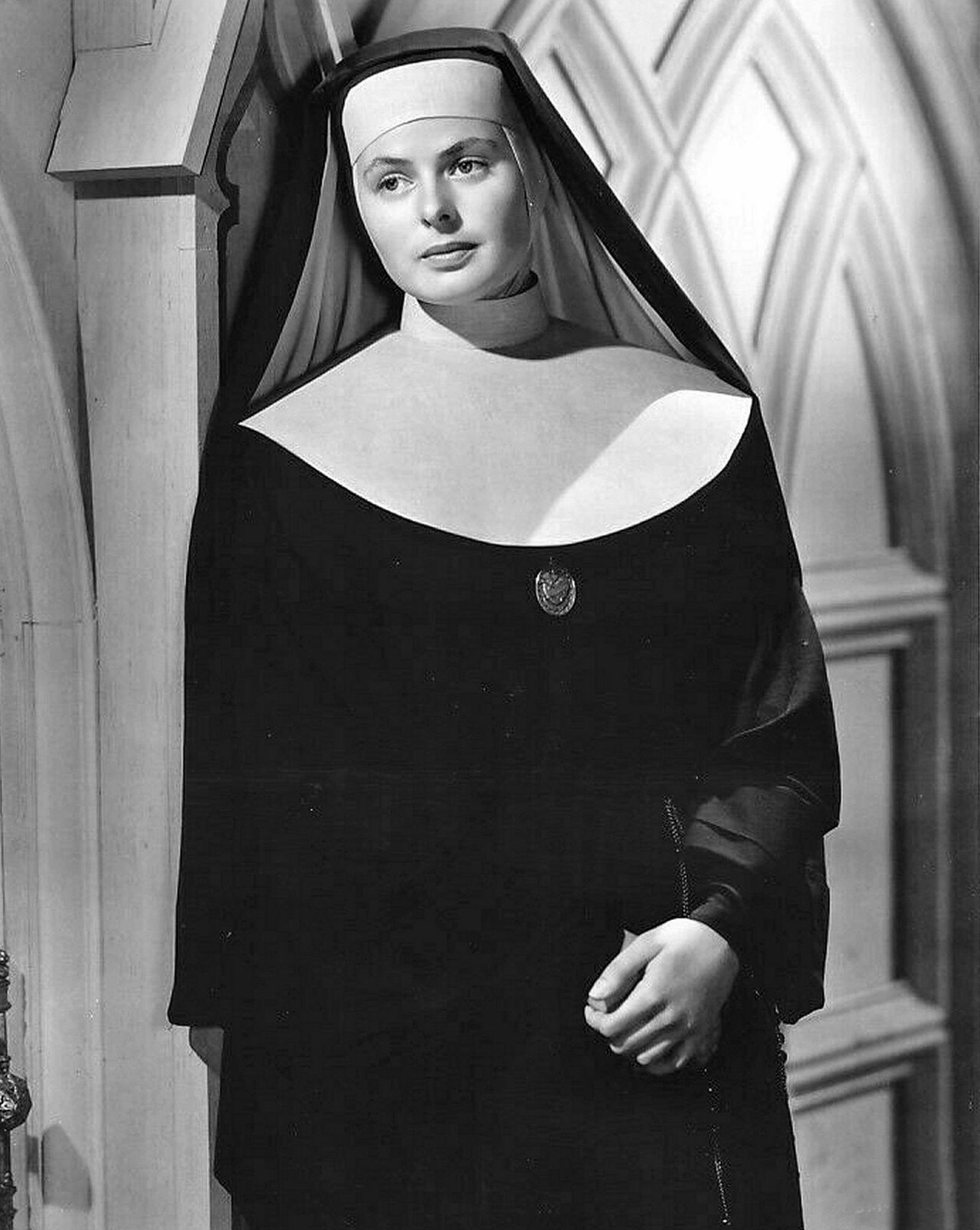
Bergman as Sister Benedict in The Bells of St. Mary's (1945)

Bergman was loaned out of David O. Selznick's company, to appear in three films which were released in 1941. On 18 February, Robert Sherwood Productions' released her second collaboration with Gregory Ratoff, Adam Had Four Sons. On 7 March, Metro-Goldwyn-Mayer released W. S. Van Dyke's Rage in Heaven. On 12 August, Victor Fleming's Dr. Jekyll and Mr. Hyde, another Metro-Goldwyn-Mayer production, had its New York opening. Bergman was supposed to play the "good girl" role of Dr Jekyll's fiancée but pleaded with the studio that she should play the "bad girl" Ivy, the saucy barmaid. Reviews noted that "she gave a finely-shaded performance". A New York Times review stated that "the young Swedish actress proves again, that a shining talent can sometimes lift itself above an impossibly written role". Another review said: "she displays a canny combination of charm, understanding, restraint and sheer acting ability."

On 30 July 1941 at the Lobero Theatre in Santa Barbara, Bergman made her second stage appearance in Anna Christie. She was praised for her performance as a whore in the play based on Eugene O'Neill's work. A San Francisco paper said she was as unspoiled as a fresh Swedish snowball. Selznick called her "The Palmolive Garbo", a reference to a popular soap, and the well-known Swedish actress of the time. Thornton Delaharty said, "Lunching with Ingrid is like sitting down to an hour or so of conversation with an intelligent orchid."

Casablanca, by Michael Curtiz, opened on 26 November 1942. Bergman co-starred with Humphrey Bogart in the film; this remains her best-known role. She played the role of Ilsa, the former love of Rick Blaine and wife of Victor Laszlo, fleeing with Laszlo to the United States. The film premiered on 26 November 1942 at New York's Hollywood Theater. The Hollywood Reporter wrote, "The events are shot with sharp humor and delightful touches of political satire." It went into more general release, in January 1943. Casablanca was not one of Bergman's favorite performances. "I made so many films which were more important, but the only one people ever want to talk about is that one with Bogart." In later years, she stated, "I feel about Casablanca that it has a life of its own. There is something mystical about it. It seems to have filled a need, a need that was there before the film, a need that the film filled". Despite her personal views regarding her performance, Bosley Crowther of The New York Times wrote that "Bergman was surprisingly lovely, crisp and natural ... and lights the romantic passages with a warm and genuine glow". Other reviewers said that she "[plays] the heroine with ... appealing authority and beauty" and "illuminates every scene in which she appears" and compared her to "a youthful Garbo."

For Whom the Bell Tolls had its New York premiere on 14 July 1943. With "Selznick's steady boosting", she played the part of Maria, it was also her first color film. For the role, she received her first Academy Award nomination for Best Actress. The film was adapted from Ernest Hemingway's novel of the same title and co-starred Gary Cooper. When the book was sold to Paramount Pictures, Hemingway stated that "Miss Bergman, and no one else, should play the part". His opinion came from seeing her in her first American role, Intermezzo. They met a few weeks later, and after studying her, he declared, "You are Maria!". James Agee, writing in The Nation, said Bergman "bears a startling resemblance to an imaginable human being; she really knows how to act, in a blend of poetic grace with quiet realism, which almost never appears in American pictures." He speaks movingly of her character's confession of her rape, and her scene of farewell, "which is shattering to watch". Agee believed that Bergman has truly studied what Maria might feel and look like in real life, and not in a Hollywood film. Her performance is both "devastating and wonderful to see".

Gaslight opened on 4 May 1944. Bergman won her first Academy Award for Best Actress for her performance. Under the direction of George Cukor, she portrayed a "wife driven close to madness" by her husband, played by Charles Boyer. The film, according to Thomson, "was the peak of her Hollywood glory." Reviewers noted her sympathetic and emotional performance, and that she exercised restraint, by not allowing emotion to "slip off into hysteria". The New York Journal-American called her "one of the finest actresses in filmdom" and said that "she flames in passion and flickers in depression until the audience—becomes rigid in its seats".

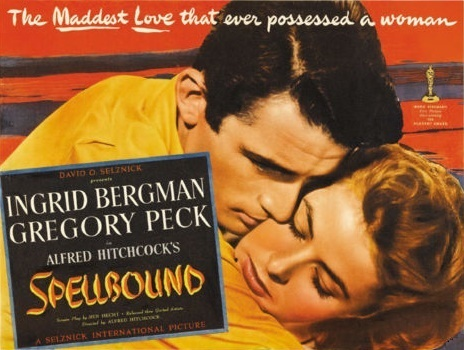
Bergman with Gregory Peck in Spellbound (1945)

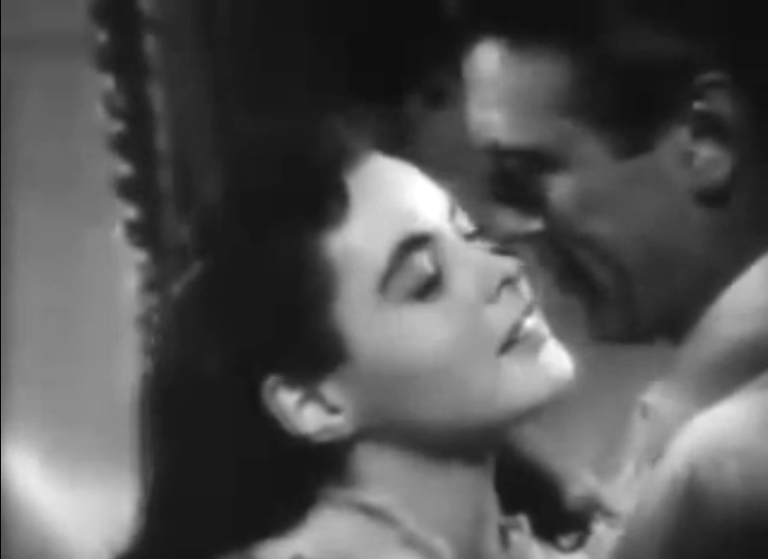
Bergman in Saratoga Trunk (1945)

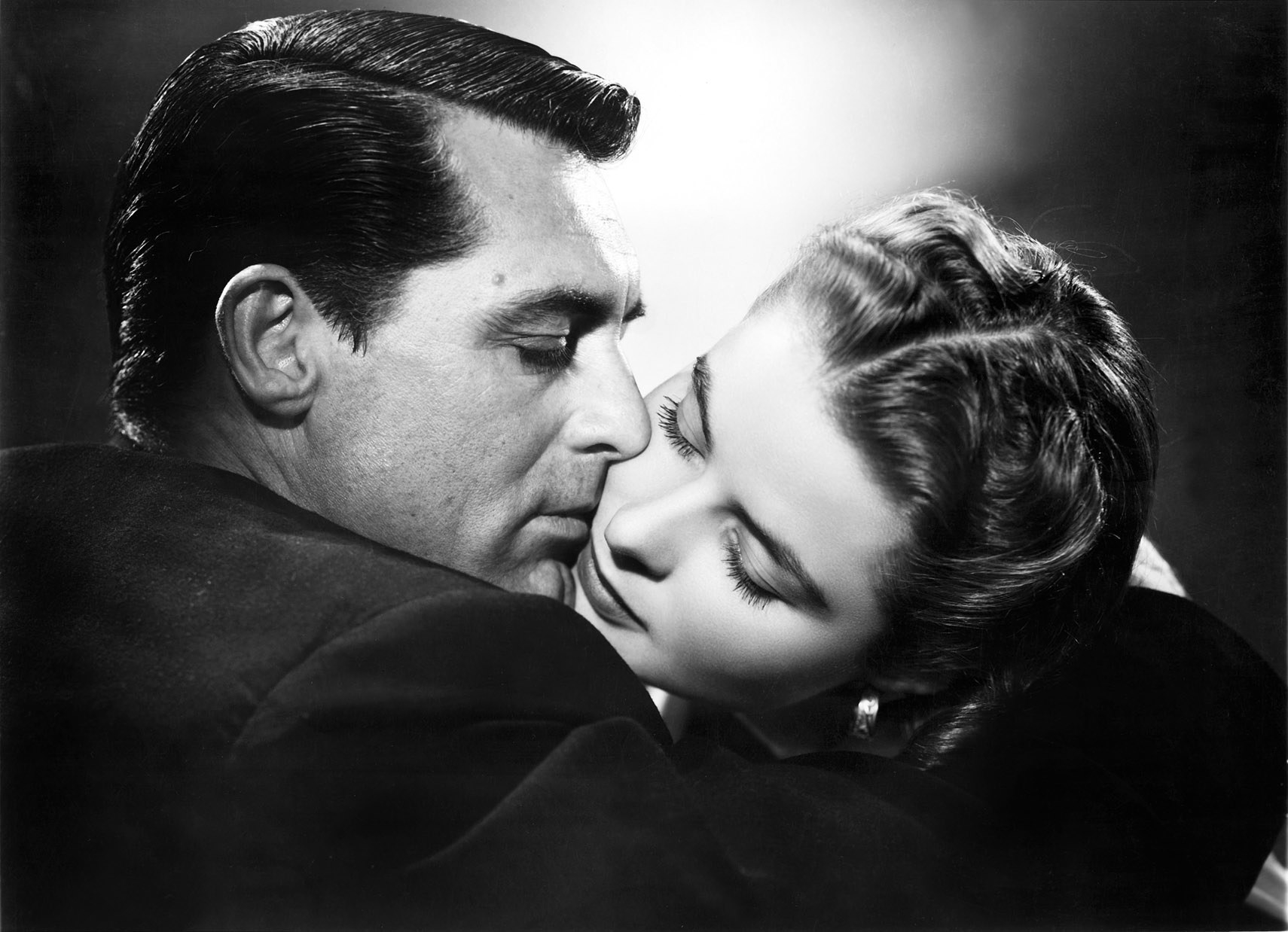
Bergman and Cary Grant in a publicity photo for Notorious (1946)

The Bells of St. Mary's premiered on 6 December 1945. Bergman played a nun opposite Bing Crosby, for which she received her third consecutive nomination for Best Actress. Crosby plays a priest who is assigned to a Roman Catholic school where he conflicts with its headmistress, played by Bergman. Reviewer Nathan Robin said: "Crosby's laconic ease brings out the impishness behind Bergman's fine-china delicacy, and Bergman proves a surprisingly spunky and spirited comic foil for Crosby". The film was the biggest box office hit of 1945.

Alfred Hitchcock's Spellbound premiered on 28 December 1945. In Spellbound, Bergman played Dr. Constance Petersen, a psychiatrist whose analysis could determine whether or not Dr. Anthony Edwardes, played by Gregory Peck, is guilty of murder. Artist Salvador Dalí was hired to create a dream sequence but much of what had been shot was cut by Selznick. During the film, she had the opportunity to appear with Michael Chekhov, who was her acting coach during the 1940s. This would be the first of three collaborations she had with Hitchcock.

Next, Bergman starred in Saratoga Trunk, with Gary Cooper, a film originally shot in 1943, but released on 30 March 1946. It was first released to the armed forces overseas. In deference to more timely war-themed and patriotic films, Warner Bros held back the theatrical opening in the United States. On 6 September premiered Hitchcock's Notorious. In it, Bergman played a US spy, Alicia Huberman, who had been given an assignment to infiltrate the Nazi sympathizers in South America. Along the way, she fell in love with her fellow spy, played by Cary Grant. The film also starred Claude Rains in an Oscar-nominated performance by a supporting actor. According to Roger Ebert, Notorious is the most elegant expression of Hitchcock's visual style. "Notorious is my favorite Hitchcock", he asserted. Writing for the BFI, Samuel Wigley called it a "perfect" film. Notorious was selected by the National Film Registry in 2006 as culturally and significantly important.

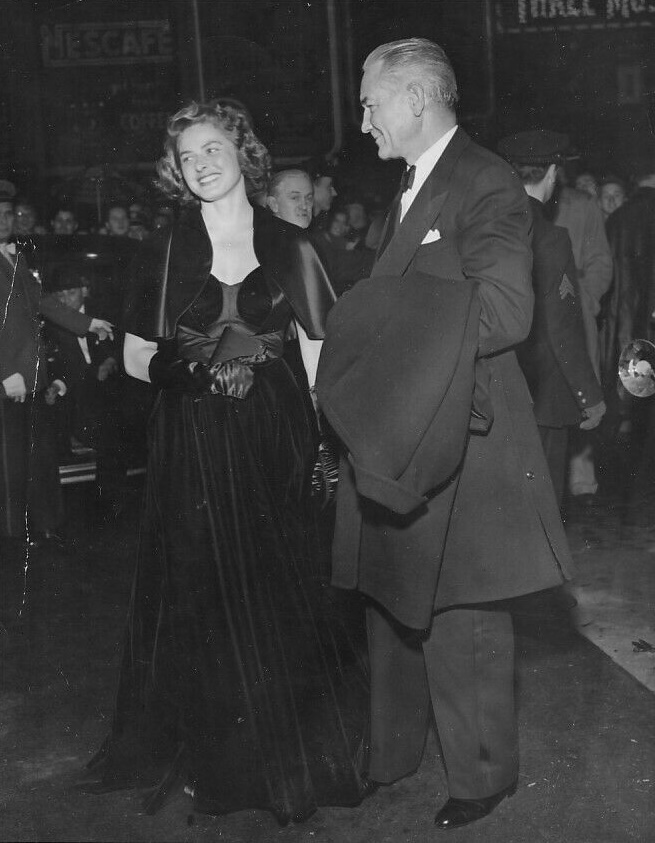
Bergman with director Victor Fleming at the premiere of Joan of Arc (1949)

On 5 October 1946, Bergman appeared in Joan of Lorraine, written by Maxwell Anderson as a play within a play, at the Alvin Theatre in New York. Tickets were fully booked for a twelve-week run. It was the greatest hit in New York. After each performance, crowds were in line to see Bergman in person. Newsweek called her 'Queen of the Broadway Season.' She reportedly received roughly $129,000 plus 15 percent of the grosses. The Associated Press named her "Woman of the Year". Gallup certified her as the most popular actress in America.

On 17 February 1948, Arch of Triumph, by Lewis Milestone was released with Bergman and Charles Boyer as the leading roles Based on Erich Maria Remarque's book, it follows a story of Joan Madou, an Italian-Romanian refugee who works as a cabaret singer in a Paris nightclub. Distressed by her lover's sudden death, she attempts suicide by plunging into the Seine, but is rescued by Dr Ravic, a German surgeon (Charles Boyer). On 11 November 1948, Joan of Arc had its world premiere. For her role, Bergman received another Best Actress nomination. The independent film was based on the Maxwell Anderson play Joan of Lorraine, which had earned her a Tony Award earlier that year. Produced by Walter Wanger and initially released through RKO. Bergman had championed the role since her arrival in Hollywood, then chose to appear on the Broadway stage in Anderson's play. The film was not a big hit with the public, partly because of the Rossellini scandal, which broke while the film was still in theatres. Even worse, it received disastrous reviews, and, although nominated for several Academy Awards, did not receive a Best Picture nomination. It was subsequently cut by 45 minutes, but restored to full length in 1998, and released in 2004 on DVD. With the release of the DVD there was also a renewed assessment of the film's acting and technical attributes, positively noting the acting, script and presentation.

Under Capricorn premiered on 9 September 1949, as another Bergman and Hitchcock collaboration. The film is set in the Australia of 1831. The story opens as Charles Adare, played by Michael Wilding, arrives in New South Wales with his uncle. Desperate to find his fortune, Adare meets Sam Flusky (Joseph Cotten), who is married to Adare's childhood friend Lady Henrietta (Bergman), an alcoholic kept locked in their mansion. Soon, Flusky becomes jealous of Adare's affection for his wife. The film met with negative reactions from critics. Some of the negativity may have been based on disapproval of Bergman's affair with the Italian director Roberto Rossellini. Their scandalous relationship became apparent, shortly after the film's release.

=== 1950–1955: Italian films with Rossellini ===
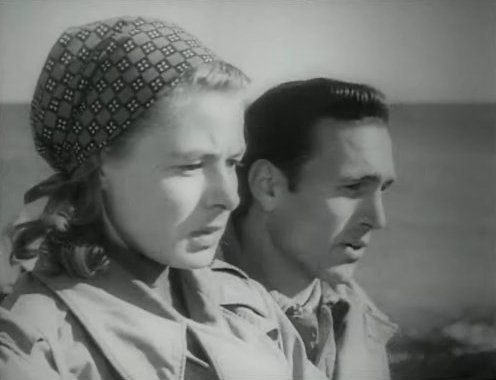
With Mario Vitale in Stromboli (1950)

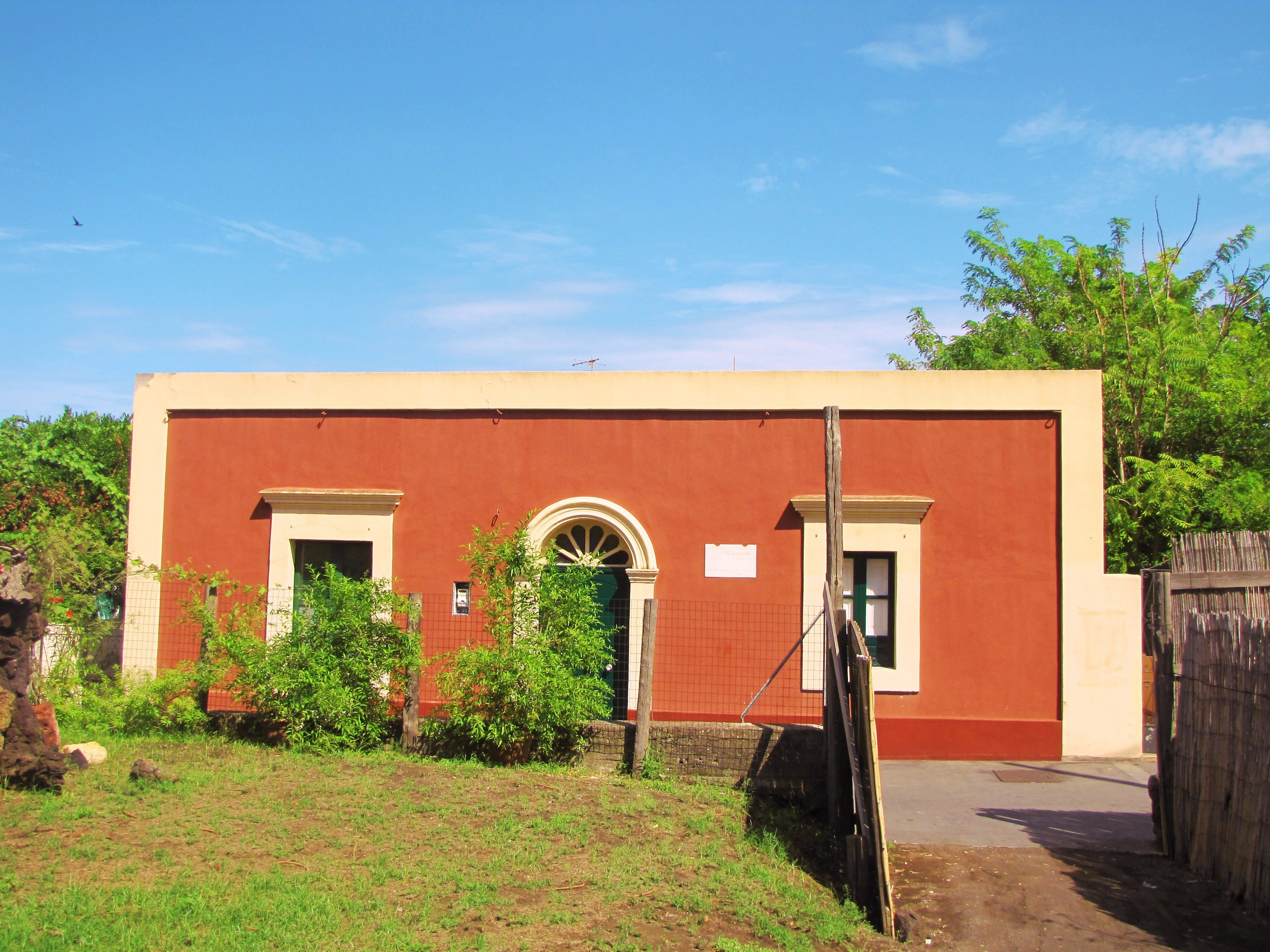
The house in Sicily where Bergman and Rossellini lived together during the filming of Stromboli

Stromboli was released by Italian director Roberto Rossellini on 18 February 1950. Bergman had greatly admired two films by Rossellini. She wrote to him in 1949, expressing her admiration and suggesting that she make a film with him. As a consequence, she was cast in Stromboli. During the production, they began an affair, and Bergman became pregnant with their first child.

This affair caused a huge scandal in the United States, where it led to Bergman being denounced on the floor of the United States Senate. On 14 March 1950, Senator Edwin C. Johnson insisted that his once-favorite actress "had perpetrated an assault upon the institution of marriage", and went so far as to call her "a powerful influence for evil". "The purity that made people joke about Saint Bergman when she played Joan of Arc," one writer commented, "made both audiences and United States senators feel betrayed when they learned of her affair with Roberto Rossellini." Art Buchwald, permitted to read her mail during the scandal, reflected in an interview, "Oh, that mail was bad, ten, twelve, fourteen huge mail bags. 'Dirty whore.' 'Bitch.' 'Son of a bitch.' And they were all Christians who wrote it."

Ed Sullivan chose not to have her on his show, despite a poll indicating that the public wanted her to appear. However, Steve Allen, whose show was equally popular, did have her as a guest, later explaining "the danger of trying to judge artistic activity through the prism of one's personal life". Donald Spoto noted that Bergman had, by virtue of her roles and screen persona, placed herself "above all that". She had played a nun in The Bells of St. Mary's (1945), and a virgin saint in Joan of Arc (1948). Bergman later said, "People saw me in Joan of Arc, and declared me a saint. I'm not. I'm just a woman, another human being." As a result of the scandal, Bergman returned to Italy, left her first husband, and went through a publicized divorce and custody battle for their daughter. Bergman and Rossellini were married on 24 May 1950.

In the United States, the film Stromboli was a box office bomb but did better overseas, where Bergman and Rossellini's affair was considered less scandalous. In all, RKO lost $200,000 on the picture. In Italy, it was awarded the Rome Prize for Cinema as the best film of the year. The initial reception in America, however, was very negative. Bosley Crowther of The New York Times opened his review by writing: "After all the unprecedented interest that the picture Stromboli has aroused—it being, of course, the fateful drama which Ingrid Bergman and Roberto Rossellini have made—it comes as a startling anticlimax to discover that this widely heralded film is incredibly feeble, inarticulate, uninspiring and painfully banal." Crowther added that Bergman's character "is never drawn with clear and revealing definition, due partly to the vagueness of the script and partly to the dullness and monotony with which Rossellini has directed her."

The staff at Variety agreed, writing

Director Roberto Rossellini purportedly denied responsibility for the film, claiming the American version was cut by RKO beyond recognition. Cut or not cut, the film reflects no credit on him. Given elementary-school dialog to recite and impossible scenes to act, Ingrid Bergman's never able to make the lines real nor the emotion sufficiently motivated to seem more than an exercise ... The only visible touch of the famed Italian director is in the hard photography, which adds to the realistic, documentary effect of life on the rocky, lava-blanketed island. Rossellini's penchant for realism, however, does not extend to Bergman. She's always fresh, clean and well-groomed.

Harrison's Reports wrote: "As entertainment, it does have a few moments of distinction, but on the whole it is a dull slow-paced piece, badly edited and mediocre in writing, direction and acting." John McCarten of The New Yorker found that there was "nothing whatsoever in the footage that rises above the humdrum", and felt that Bergman "doesn't really seem to have her heart in any of the scenes." Richard L. Coe of The Washington Post lamented, "It's a pity that many people who never go to foreign-made pictures will be drawn into this by the Rossellini-Bergman names and will think that this flat, drab, inept picture is what they've been missing."

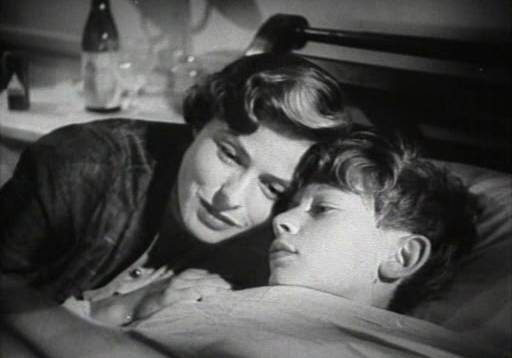
Bergman as Irene Girard in Europa '51

Recent assessments have been more positive. Reviewing the film in 2013 in conjunction with its DVD release as part of The Criterion Collection, Dave Kehr called the film "one of the pioneering works of modern European filmmaking." In an expansive analysis of the film, critic Fred Camper wrote of the drama,

Like many of cinema's masterpieces, Stromboli is fully explained only in a final scene that brings into harmony the protagonist's state of mind and the imagery. This structure...suggests a belief in the transformative power of revelation. Forced to drop her suitcase (itself far more modest than the trunks she arrived with) as she ascends the volcano, Karin is stripped of her pride and reduced—or elevated—to the condition of a crying child, a kind of first human being who, divested of the trappings of self, must learn to see and speak again from a personal "year zero" (to borrow from another Rossellini film title).

The Venice Film Festival ranked Stromboli among the 100 most important Italian films ("100 film italiani da salvare") from 1942 to 1978. In 2012, the British Film Institute's Sight & Sound critics' poll also listed it as one of the 250 greatest films of all time.

In 1952, Rossellini directed Bergman in Europa '51, where she plays Irene Girard who is distraught by the sudden death of her son. Her husband played by Alexander Knox soon copes, but Irene seems to need a purpose in life to assuage her guilt of neglecting her son.

Rossellini directed her in a brief segment of his 1953 documentary film, Siamo donne (We, the Women), which was devoted to film actresses. His biographer, Peter Bondanella, notes that problems with communication during their marriage may have inspired his films' central themes of "solitude, grace, and spirituality in a world without moral values". In December 1953, Rossellini directed her in the play Joan of Arc at the Stake in Naples, Italy. They took the play to Barcelona, London, Paris and Stockholm. Her performance received generally good reviews.

Their following effort was Viaggio in Italia (Journey to Italy) in 1954. It follows a couple's journey to Naples, Italy to sell an inherited house. Trapped in a lifeless marriage, they are further unnerved by the locals' way of living. According to John Patterson of The Guardian, the film started The French New Wave. Martin Scorsese picked this film to be among his favorites in his documentary short in 2001. On 17 February 1955, Joan at the Stake opened at the Stockholm Opera House. The play was attended by the prime minister and other theatrical figures in Sweden. Swedish Daily reported that Bergman seems vague, cool and lacking in charisma. Bergman was hurt by mostly negative reviews from the media of her native land. Stig Ahlgren was the most harsh when he labelled her a clever businesswoman, not an actress. "Ingrid is a commodity, a desirable commodity which is offered in the free market." Another effort they released that year was Giovanna d'Arco al rogo (Joan of Arc at the Stake).

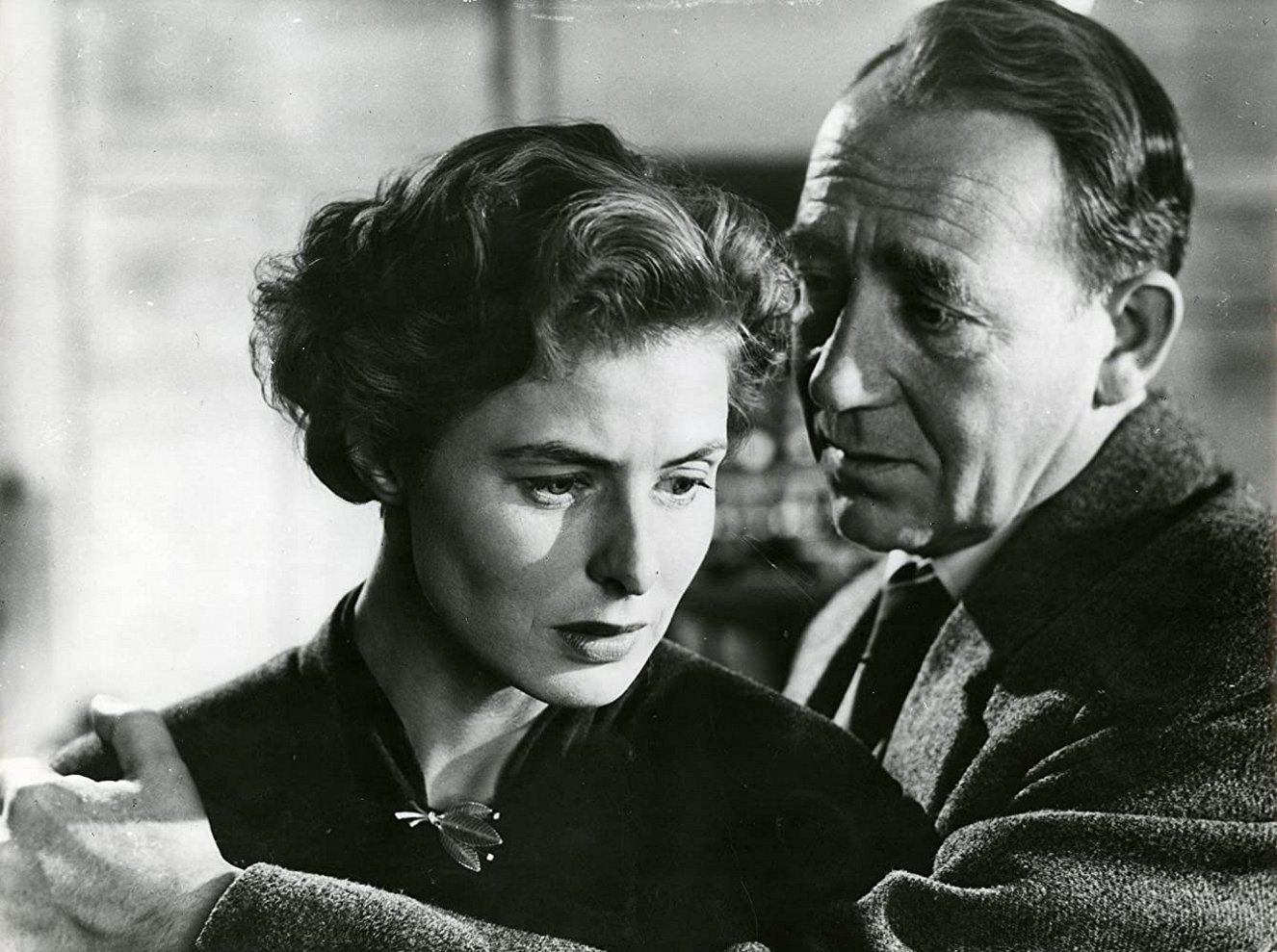
Bergman in La Paura (Fear) (1954)

Their final effort in 1954 was La Paura (Fear), based on a play by Austro-Jewish writer Stefan Zweig's 1920 novella Angst about adultery and blackmail. In Fear, Bergman plays a businesswoman who runs a pharmaceutical company founded by her husband (Mathias Wieman). She is having an affair with a man whose ex-lover turns up and blackmails her. The woman demands money, threatening to tell her husband about the affair if Bergman doesn't pay her off. Under constant threats, Bergman is pressed to the point of committing suicide.

Rossellini's use of a Hollywood star in his typically "neorealist" films, in which he normally used non-professional actors, provoked some negative reactions. Rossellini, "defying audience expectations[,]...employed Bergman as if she were a nonprofessional," depriving her of a script and the typical luxuries accorded to a star (indoor plumbing, for instance, or hairdressers) and forcing Bergman to act "inspired by reality while she worked", creating what one critic calls "a new cinema of psychological introspection". Bergman was aware of Rossellini's directing style before filming, as the director had earlier written to her explaining that he worked from "a few basic ideas, developing them little by little" as a film progressed. Rossellini then was accused of ruining her successful career by taking her away from Hollywood, while Bergman was seen as the impetus for Rossellini abandoning the aesthetic style and socio-political concerns of Neo-Realism.

While the movies Bergman made with Rossellini were commercial failures, the films have garnered great appreciation and attention in recent times. According to Jordan Cronk in his article reviewing the movies, their work has inspired a beginning of a modern cinematic era. Rossellini's films during the Bergman era ponder issues of complex psychology as depicted by Bergman in films like Stromboli, Europa '51 and Journey to Italy. The influence of Bergman and Rossellini's partnership can be felt in the movies by Godard, Fellini and Antonioni to, more recently, Abbas Kiarostami and Nuri Bilge Ceylan. David Kehr from The New York Times commented that their films now stand among the pioneering works whose influence can be felt in European modern filmmaking.

=== 1956–1972: Hollywood return ===
With Mel Ferrer in Renoir's Elena and Her Men (1956)

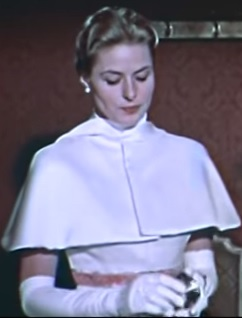
In Anastasia (1956) which won her second Oscar

After separating from Rossellini, Bergman starred in Jean Renoir's Elena and Her Men (Elena et les Hommes, 1956), a romantic comedy in which she played a Polish princess caught up in political intrigue. Bergman and Renoir had wanted to work together. In Elena and Her Men, which Renoir had written for her, she plays down-on-her-luck Polish princess Elena Sorokowska. The film was a hit in Paris when it premiered in September 1956. Candice Russell, commented that Bergman is the best thing in the film. Roger Ebert wrote, "The movie is about something else—about Bergman's rare eroticism, and the way her face seems to have an inner light on film. Was there ever a more sensuous actress in the movies?"

In 1956, Bergman also starred in a French adaptation of the stage production Tea and Sympathy. It was presented at the Théâtre de Paris, Paris. It tells a story of a "boarding school boy" who is thought to be homosexual. Bergman played the wife of the headmaster. She is supportive of the young man, grows closer to him and later has sex with him, as a way to "prove" and support his masculinity. It was a smash hit.

Twentieth Century Fox had bought the rights to Anastasia with Anatole Litvak slated to direct. Executive producer Buddy Adler wanted Bergman, then still a controversial figure in the States, to return to the American screen after a seven-year absence. Litvak also felt she would be an excellent actress for the part and insisted on her starring in the film. Fox agreed to take a chance, making her a box-office risk to play the leading role. Filming would take place in England, Paris, and Copenhagen.

Anastasia (1956) tells the story of a woman who may be the sole surviving member of the Romanov family. Yul Brynner is the scheming general, who tries to pass her off as the single surviving daughter of the late Tsar Nicholas II. He hopes to use her to collect a hefty inheritance. Anastasia was an immediate success. Bosley Crowther wrote in The New York Times, "It is a beautifully molded performance, worthy of an Academy Award and particularly gratifying in the light of Miss Bergman's long absence from commendable films."

With her role in Anastasia, Bergman made a triumphant return to working for a Hollywood studio (albeit in a film produced in Europe) and won the Academy Award for Best Actress for a second time. Cary Grant accepted the award on her behalf. Its director, Anatole Litvak, described her as "one of the greatest actresses in the world":

Ingrid looks better now than she ever did. She's 42, but she looks divine. She is a simple, straightforward human being. Through all her troubles she held to the conviction that she had been true to herself and it made her quite a person. She is happy in her new marriage, her three children by Rossellini are beautiful, and she adores them.

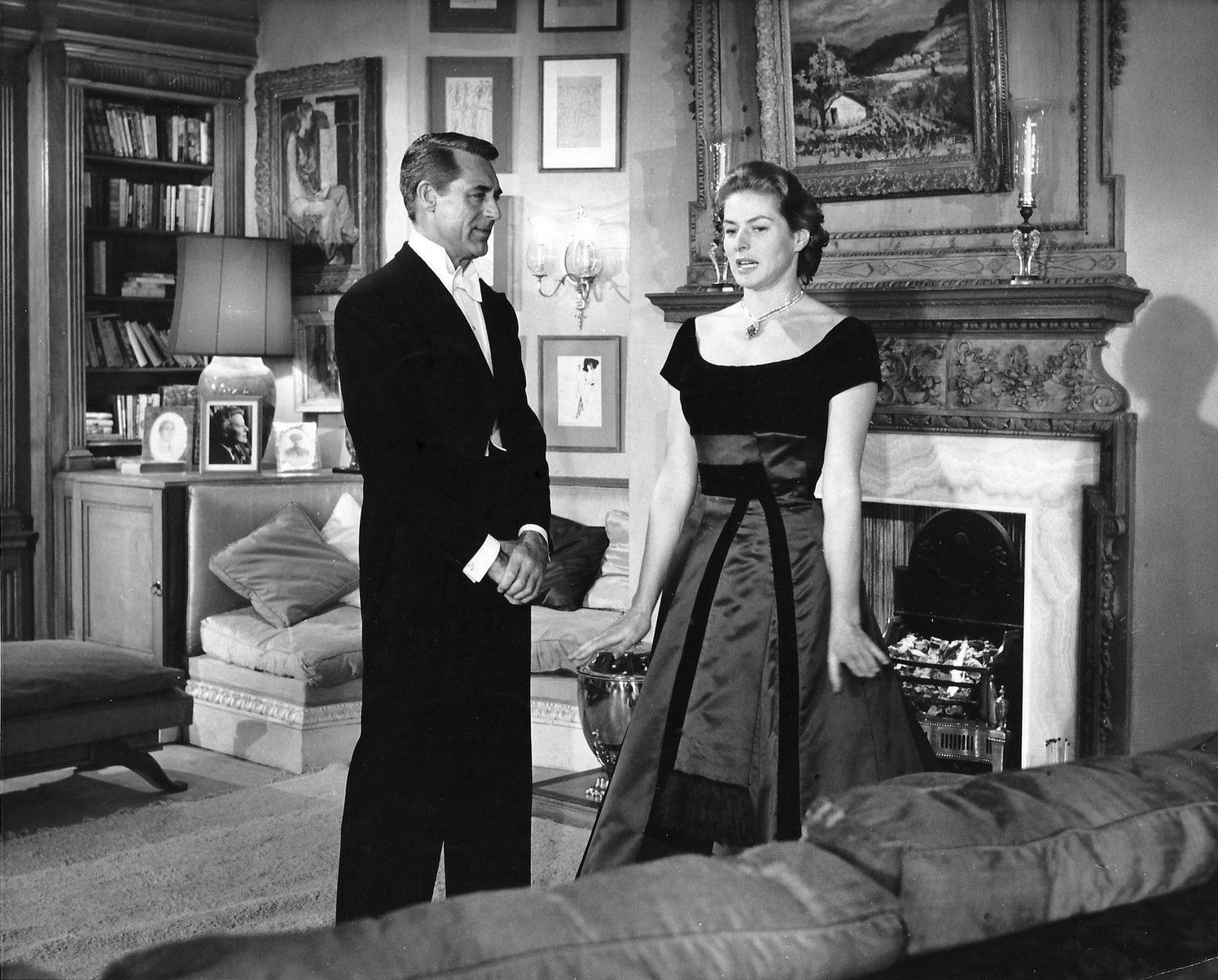
Grant and Bergman in Indiscreet (1958)

After Anastasia, Bergman starred in Indiscreet (1958), a romantic comedy directed by Stanley Donen. She plays a successful London stage actress, Anna Kalman, who falls in love with Philip Adams, a diplomat played by Cary Grant. The film is based on the play Kind Sir written by Norman Krasna. Unmarried and wanting to stay single, he tells her that he is married but cannot get a divorce. Cecil Parker and Phyllis Calvert also co-starred.

Bergman later starred in the 1958 picture The Inn of the Sixth Happiness, based on a true story about Gladys Aylward, a Christian missionary in China who, despite many obstacles, was able to win the hearts of the Chinese through patience and sincerity. In the film's climactic scene, she leads a group of orphaned children to safety, to escape from the Japanese invasion. The New York Times wrote, "the justification of her achievements is revealed by no other displays than those of Miss Bergman's mellow beauty, friendly manner and melting charm." The film also co-starred Robert Donat and Curd Jurgens.

Bergman made her first post-scandal public appearance in Hollywood at the 31st Academy Awards in 1959, as presenter of the award for Best Picture, and received a standing ovation when introduced. She presented the award for Best Motion Picture together with Cary Grant, with whom she had recently starred in Indiscreet. Bergman made her television debut in an episode of Startime, an anthology show, which presented dramas, musical comedies, and variety shows. The episode was The Turn of the Screw, an adaptation of the horror novella by Henry James, directed by John Frankenheimer. She played a governess of two little children who are haunted by the ghost of their previous caretaker. For this performance, she was awarded the 1960 Emmy for best dramatic performance by an actress. Also in 1960, Bergman was inducted into the Hollywood Walk of Fame with a motion pictures star at 6759 Hollywood Boulevard.

In 1961, Bergman's second American television production, Twenty-four Hours in a Woman's Life, was produced by her third husband, Lars Schmidt. Bergman played a bereaved wife in love with a younger man she has known for only 24 hours. She later starred in Goodbye Again as Paula Tessier, a middle-aged interior designer who falls in love with Anthony Perkins' character, fifteen years her junior. Paula is in a relationship with Roger Demarest, a womanizer, played by Yves Montand. Roger loves Paula but is reluctant to give up his womanizing ways. When Perkins starts pursuing her, the lonely Paula is suddenly forced to choose between the two men. In his review of the film, Bosley Crowther wrote that Bergman was neither convincing nor interesting in her part as Perkins's lover.

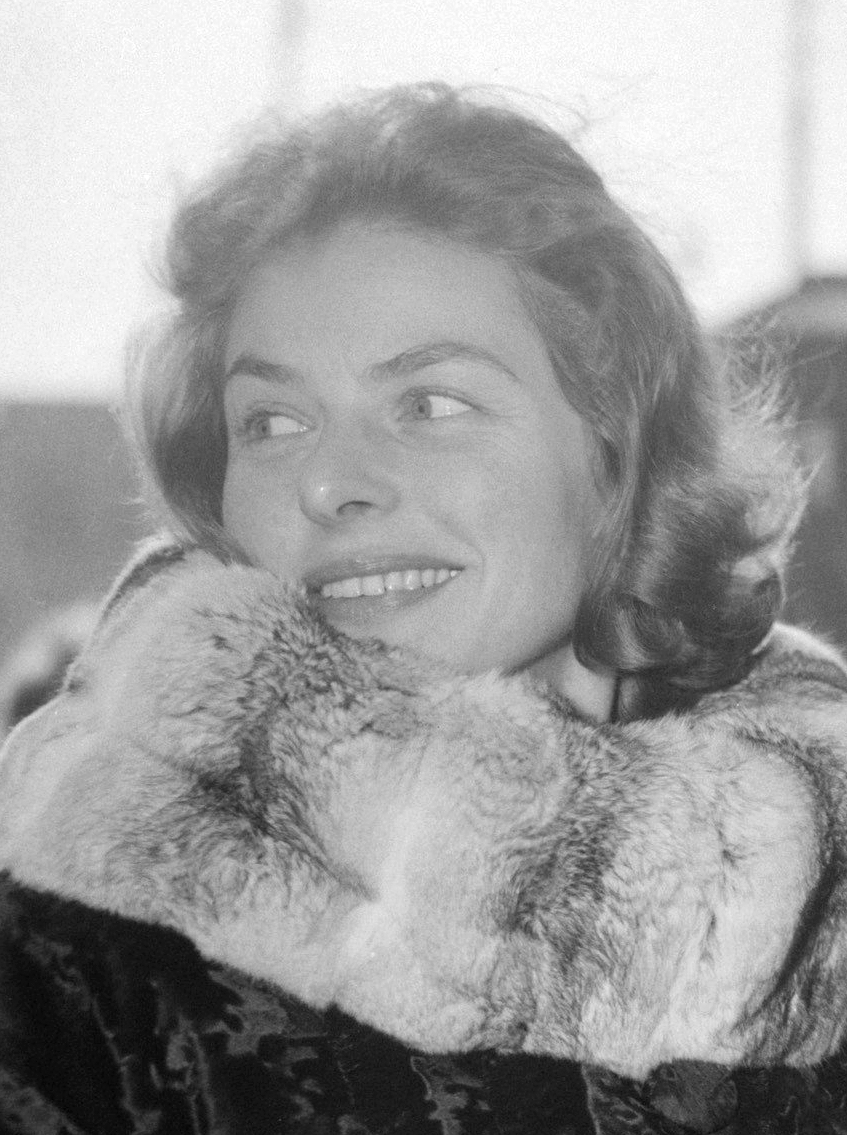
Bergman in 1960

In 1962, Schmidt also co-produced his wife's third venture into American television, Hedda Gabler, made for the BBC and CBS. She played the titular character opposite Michael Redgrave and Ralph Richardson. David Duprey wrote in his review, "Bergman and Sir Ralph Richardson on screen at the same time is like peanut butter and chocolate spread on warm toast." Later in the year, she took the titular role of Hedda Gabler at the Théâtre Montparnasse in Paris.

On 23 September 1964, The Visit premiered; based on Friedrich Dürrenmatt's 1956 play, Der Besuch der alten Dame; eine tragische Komödie, it starred Bergman and Anthony Quinn. With a production budget of $1.5 million, principal photography took place in Capranica, outside of Rome. She plays Karla Zachanassian, the world's richest woman, who returns to her birthplace, seeking revenge.

On 13 May 1965, Anthony Asquith's The Yellow Rolls-Royce premiered. Bergman plays Gerda Millett, a wealthy American widow who meets up with a Yugoslavian partisan, Omar Sharif. For her role, she was reportedly paid $250,000. That same year, although known chiefly as a film star, Bergman appeared in London's West End, working with stage star Michael Redgrave in A Month in the Country. She took on the role of Natalia Petrovna, a lovely headstrong woman, bored with her marriage and her life. According to The Times, "The production would hardly have exerted this special appeal without the presence of Ingrid Bergman."

In 1966, Bergman acted in only one project, an hour-long television version of Jean Cocteau's one-character play, The Human Voice. It tells a story of a lonely woman in her apartment talking on the phone to her lover who is about to leave her for another woman. The New York Times praised her performance, calling it a tour-de-force. The Times of London echoed the same sentiment, describing it as a great dramatic performance through this harrowing monologue.

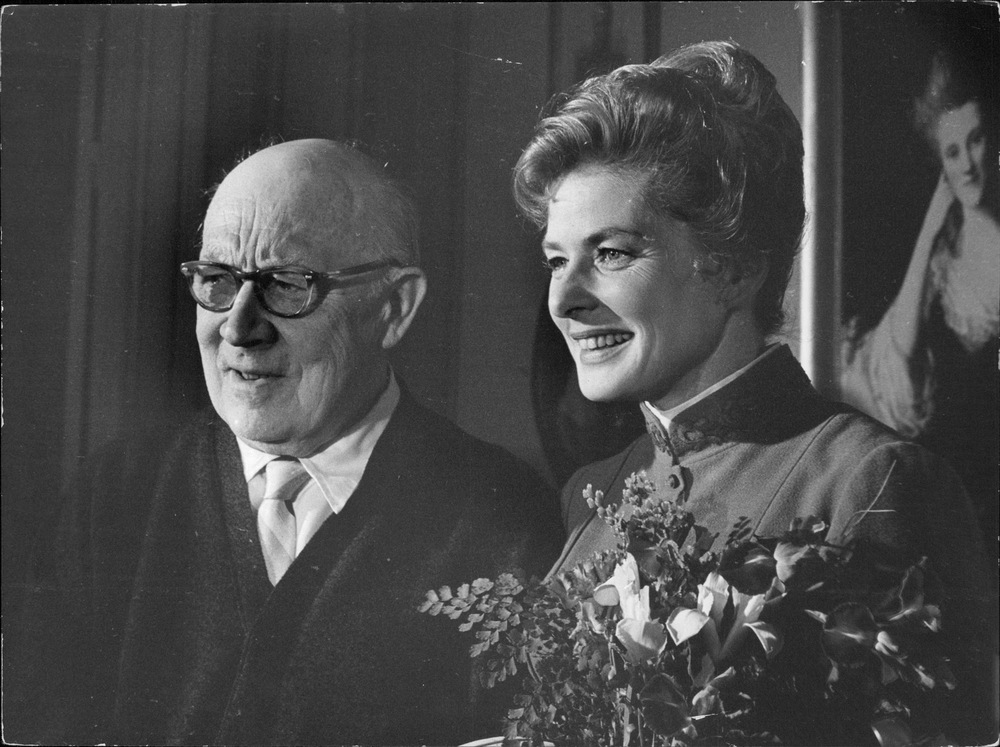
Bergman with Gustaf Molander, who directed her in Stimulantia

In 1967, Bergman was cast in a short episode of Swedish anthology film, Stimulantia. Her segment which is based on the Guy de Maupassant's The Jewellery reunited her with Gustaf Molander. Next, Eugene O'Neill's More Stately Mansions directed by José Quintero, opened on 26 October 1967. Bergman, Colleen Dewhurst, and Arthur Hill appeared in the leading roles. The show closed on 2 March 1968 after 142 performances. It was reported that thousands of spectators bought tickets, and travelled across the country, to see Bergman perform. Bergman returned as both a presenter and a performer during the 41st Annual Academy Awards in 1969.

Bergman wished to work in American films again, following a long hiatus. She starred in Cactus Flower released in 1969, with Walter Matthau and Goldie Hawn. Here, she played a prim spinster, a dental nurse-receptionist who is secretly in love with her boss, the dentist, played by Matthau. Howard Thompson wrote in The New York Times:

The teaming of Matthau, whose dour, craggy virility now supplants the easy charm of Barry Nelson, and the ultra-feminine Miss Bergman, in a rare comedy venture, was inspirational on somebody's part. The lady is delightful as a (now) "Swedish iceberg", no longer young, who flowers radiantly while running interference for the boss's romantic bumbling. The two stars mesh perfectly.

On 9 April 1970, Guy Green's A Walk in the Spring Rain had its world premiere. Bergman played Libby, the middle-aged wife of a New York professor (Fritz Weaver). She accompanies him on his sabbatical in the Tennessee mountains, where he intends to write a book. She meets a local handyman, Will Cade (Anthony Quinn), and they form a mutual attraction. The screenplay, by writer-producer Stirling Silliphant, was based on the romantic novel written by Rachel Maddux. The New York Times in its review wrote, "Striving mightily and looking lovely, Miss Bergman seems merely a petulant woman who falls into the arms of Quinn for novelty, from boredom with her equally bored husband, [Weaver], pecking away on a book in their temporary mountain retreat."

On 18 February 1971, Captain Brassbound's Conversion, a play based on George Bernard Shaw's work, made a debut at London theatre. She took on the role of a woman whose husband has taken up with a woman half her age. Although the play was a commercial success, critics were not very receptive of Bergman's British accent.

She made an appearance in one episode of The Bob Hope Show in 1972. Also that year, U.S. Senator Charles H. Percy entered an apology into the Congressional Record for the verbal attack made on Bergman on 14 March 1950 by Edwin C. Johnson. Percy noted that she had been "the victim of bitter attack in this chamber 22 years ago." He expressed regret that the persecution caused Bergman to "leave this country at the height of her career". Bergman said that the remarks had been difficult to forget, and had caused her to avoid the country for nine years. Although she had paid a high price, Bergman had made peace with America, according to her daughter, Isabella Rossellini.

=== 1973–1982: Later years and continued success ===
On 27 September 1972, Fielder Cook's From the Mixed-Up Files of Mrs. Basil E. Frankweiler premiered. She plays the titular character, a wealthy recluse who befriends two children who are seeking "treasure" in the Metropolitan Museum of Art.

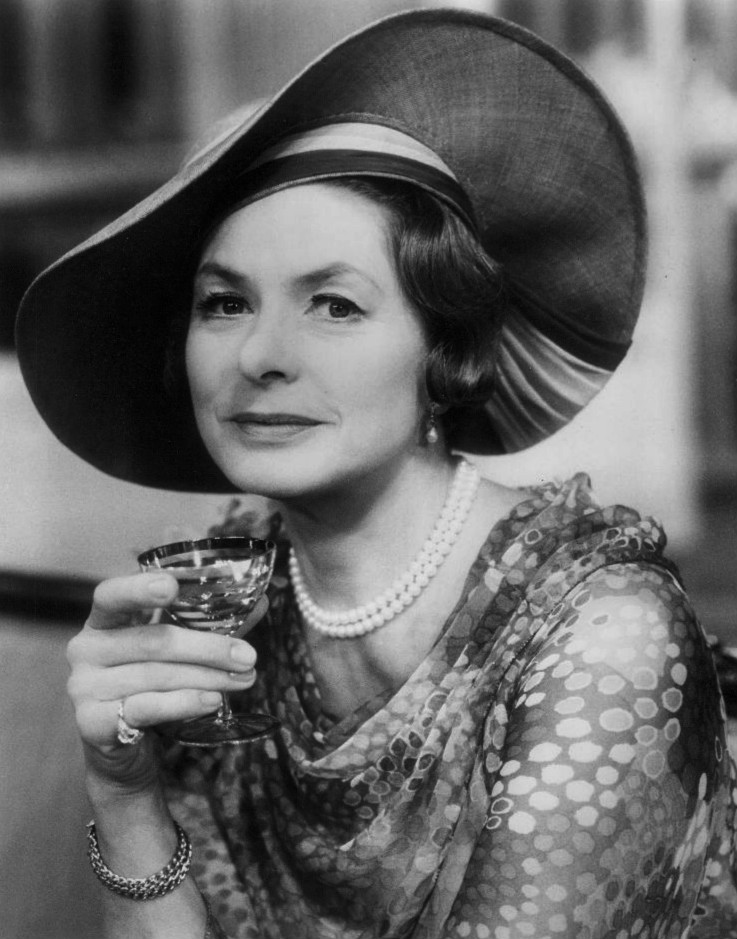
Bergman in The Constant Wife

Also that year, Bergman was the president of the jury at the 1973 Cannes Film Festival. In an interview with The Daytona Beach Sunday News in 1978, she recalled this event because she met with the unrelated Ingmar Bergman. This gave her the opportunity to remind him about a letter she had written some ten years ago, asking him to cast her in one of his pictures. Knowing that Ingmar would be attending, she made a copy of his long-ago reply, and put it in his pocket. He didn't reply for two years.

Next, Bergman returned to London's West End and appeared with John Gielgud in The Constant Wife, which was a critical success; the theatre was consistently packed. The Daily Telegraph found the play "unusually entertaining", while Harold Hobson of The Sunday Times was still peeved at Bergman for playing yet another English woman with a "strange accent".

Bergman became one of the few actresses ever to receive three Oscars when she won her third (and first in the category of Best Supporting Actress) for her performance in Murder on the Orient Express (1974). Director Sidney Lumet had offered Bergman the important part of Princess Dragomiroff, with which he felt she could win an Oscar. She insisted on playing the much smaller role of Greta Ohlsson, the old Swedish missionary. Lumet discussed Bergman's role:

She had chosen a very small part, and I couldn't persuade her to change her mind. ... Since her part was so small, I decided to film her one big scene, where she talks for almost five minutes, straight, all in one long take. A lot of actresses would have hesitated over that. She loved the idea, and made the most of it. She ran the gamut of emotions. I've never seen anything like it.

At the 1975 Academy Awards, film director Jean Renoir was to receive a Lifetime Achievement Award for his contribution to the motion picture industry. As he was ill at the time, he asked that Ingrid Bergman accept this award on his behalf. Bergman made a speech of acceptance that praised his films and the "compassion that marked all his works" as well as his teaching of both young filmmakers and audiences. Although she had been nominated for the new Best Supporting Actress Award, she considered her role in Murder on the Orient Express to be quite minor and did not expect to win. When the award was announced, in her surprised and unrehearsed remarks, she remarked to the audience that Valentina Cortese should have won the award for her role in Day for Night, by Truffaut. Bergman and Cortese spent the rest of the evening in each other's company, and were the subject of many photographs. Also in 1975, Bergman attended the AFI tribute to Orson Welles. The audience gave her a standing ovation when she appeared on stage. She joked that she hardly knew Welles and they only invited her because she was working across the street.

In 1976, Bergman was the first person to receive France's newly created Honorary César, a national film award. She also appeared in A Matter of Time, by Vincente Minnelli, which premiered on 7 October 1976. It also was the debut of his daughter Liza Minnelli. Roger Ebert in his review wrote,

A Matter of Time is a fairly large disappointment as a movie, but as an occasion for reverie, it does very nicely. Once we've finally given up on the plot – a meandering and jumbled business – we're left with the opportunity to contemplate Ingrid Bergman at 60. And to contemplate Ingrid Bergman at any age is, I submit, a passable way to spend one's time.

From 1977 to 1978, Bergman returned to the London's West with Wendy Hiller in Waters of the Moon. She played Helen Lancaster, a rich, self-centred woman whose car becomes stuck in a snowdrift. The play became the great new hit of the season.

In 1978, Bergman appeared in Autumn Sonata (Höstsonaten), by accomplished Swedish filmmaker, Ingmar Bergman (no relation), for which she received her seventh—and final—Academy Award nomination. She did not attend the awards, due to her illness. This was her final cinema performance. The film gave her the opportunity to work with Liv Ullmann, another well-known and respected Scandinavian artist. In the film, Bergman plays a celebrity pianist, Charlotte, who travels to Norway intending to visit her neglected eldest daughter, Eva, played by Ullmann. Eva is married to a clergyman and they care for her sister, Helena, who is severely disabled, paralyzed, and unable to speak clearly. Charlotte has not visited either of her two daughters for seven years. Upon arrival at Eva's home, she is shocked and dismayed to learn that her younger daughter is also in residence, and not still in the institution "home". Very late that night, Eva and Charlotte have an impassioned and painful conversation about their past relationship. Charlotte leaves the next day. The film was shot in Norway.

Bergman was battling cancer at the time of the filming. The final two weeks of the shooting schedule required adjustment because she required additional surgery. Believing that her career was nearing its end, Bergman wanted her swan song to be honourable. She was pleased with the overwhelming critical acclaim for Autumn Sonata. Stanley Kaufmann of The New Republic wrote, "The astonishment is Bergman's performance. We've all adored her for decades but not many of us have thought her a superb actress. Here, she exalted in the hands of a master." Newsweek wrote, "An expressive force we can't even remember seeing since Hollywood grabbed her." The Times (London) concurred that it was "a tour-de-force, such as the cinema rarely sees". Bergman and Ullmann won the New York Film Critic's Award and Italy's Donatello award for their roles. Bergman later recalled that Ingmar had possibly given her the best role of her career, and that she would never make another movie again. "I don't want to go down and play little parts. This should be the end."

In 1979, Bergman hosted the AFI's Life Achievement Award Ceremony for Alfred Hitchcock. At the program's finale, she presented him with the wine cellar key that was crucial to the plot of Notorious. "Cary Grant kept this for 10 years, then he gave it to me, and I kept it for 20 years for good luck and now I give it to you with my prayers," before adding "God bless you, Hitch." Bergman was the guest of honour in the Variety's Club All Star Salute program in December 1979. The show was hosted by Jimmy Stewart and was attended by Cary Grant, Frank Sinatra, Goldie Hawn, Helen Hayes, Paul Henreid and many of her former co-stars. She was honored with the Illis Quorum, the medal given to artists of significance by the King of Sweden.

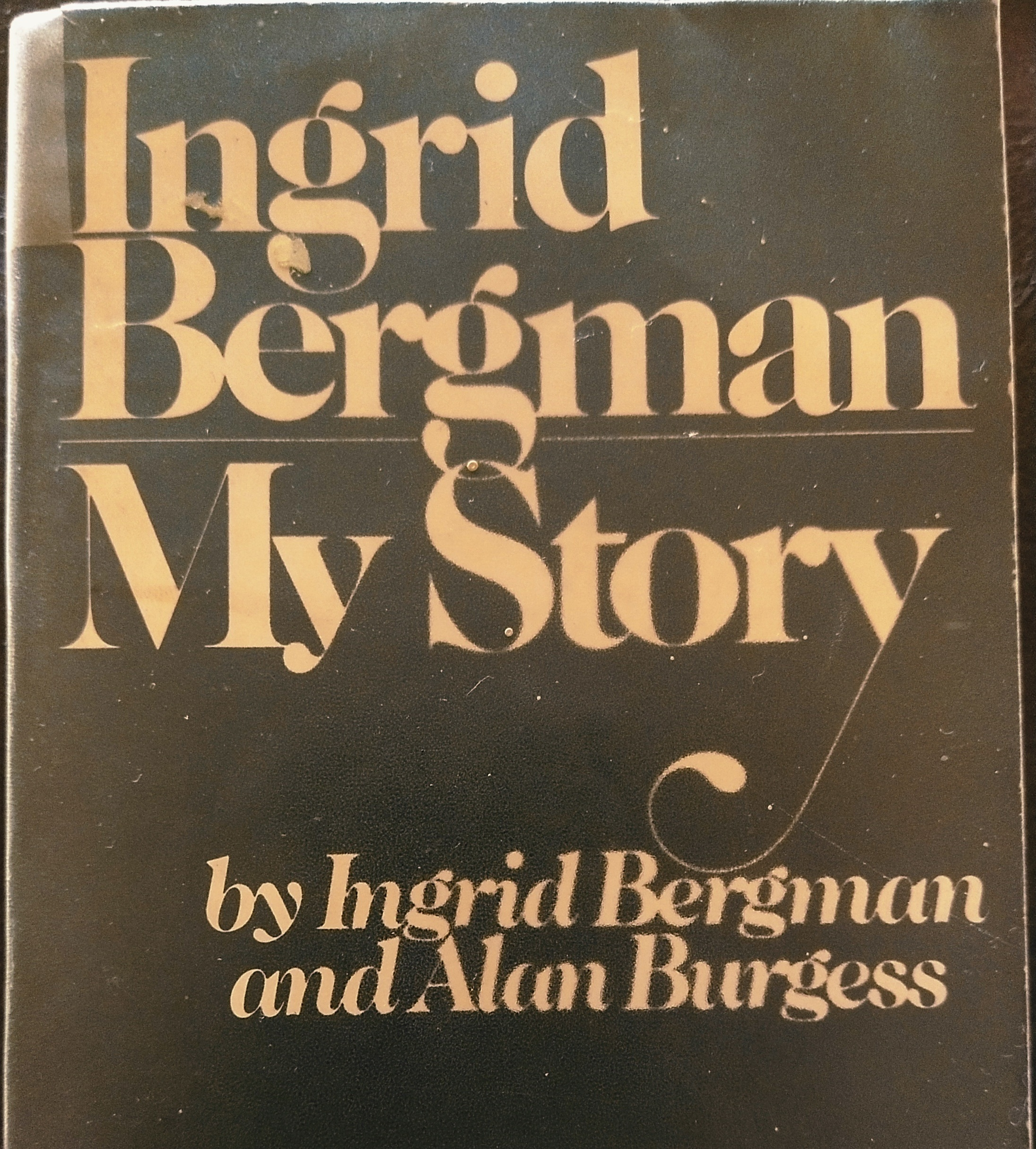
Bergman's autobiography, My Story

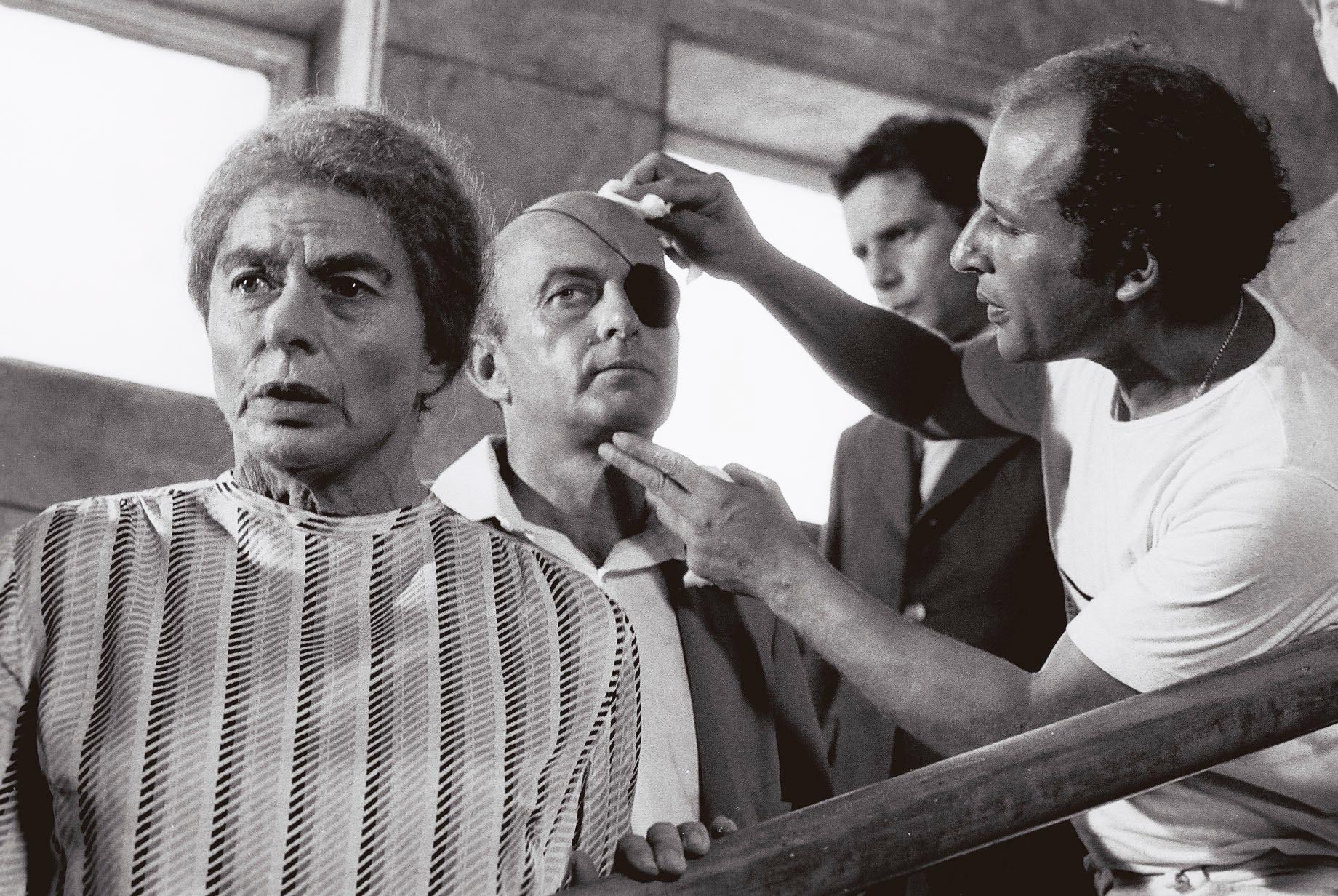
Bergman's last performance in A Woman Called Golda won her an Emmy posthumously.

In the late '70s, Bergman appeared on several talk shows and was interviewed by Merv Griffin, David Frost, Michael Parkinson, Mike Douglas, John Russell and Dick Cavett, discussing her life and career.

In 1980, Bergman's autobiography, Ingrid Bergman: My Story, was written with the help of Alan Burgess. In it, she discusses her childhood, her early career, her life during her time in Hollywood, the Rossellini scandal, and subsequent events. The book was written after her son warned her that she would only be known through rumors and interviews if she did not tell her own story. In 1982, she was awarded the David di Donatello Golden Medal of the Minister of Tourism, given by The Academy of Italian Cinema.

Finally that year, Bergman played the starring role in a television miniseries, A Woman Called Golda (1982), about the late Israeli prime minister Golda Meir. It was to be her final acting role and she was honored posthumously with a second Emmy Award for Best Actress. Bergman was surprised to be offered the role, but the producer explained, "People believe you and trust you, and this is what I want, because Golda Meir had the trust of the people." Her daughter Isabella added, "Now, that was interesting to Mother." She was also persuaded that Golda was a "grand-scale person", one who people would assume was much taller than she actually was. Chandler notes that the role "also had a special significance for her, as during World War II, Ingrid felt guilty because she had so misjudged the situation in Germany".

According to Chandler, "Ingrid's rapidly deteriorating health was a more serious problem. Insurance for Bergman was impossible. Not only did she have cancer, but it was spreading, and if anyone had known how bad it was, no one would have gone on with the project." After viewing the series on TV, Isabella commented:

She never showed herself like that in life. In life, Mum showed courage. She was always a little vulnerable, courageous, but vulnerable. Mother had a sort of presence, like Golda, I was surprised to see it ... When I saw her performance, I saw a mother that I'd never seen before—this woman with balls.

Her daughter said that Bergman identified with Golda Meir, because she, too had felt guilty. Bergman tried to strike a balance between home and work responsibilities and deal with "the inability to be in two places at one time". Bergman's arm was terribly swollen from her cancer surgery. She was often ill during the filming, recovering from a mastectomy and the removal of lymph nodes. It was important to her, as an actress, to make a certain gesture of Meir's, which required her to raise both arms, but she was unable to properly raise one arm. During the night, her arm was propped up, in an uncomfortable position, so that the fluid would drain, and enable her to perform her character's important gesture.

Despite her health problems, she rarely complained or let others see the difficulties she endured. Four months after the filming was completed, Bergman died on her 67th birthday. After her death, her daughter Pia accepted her Emmy.

== Personal life ==
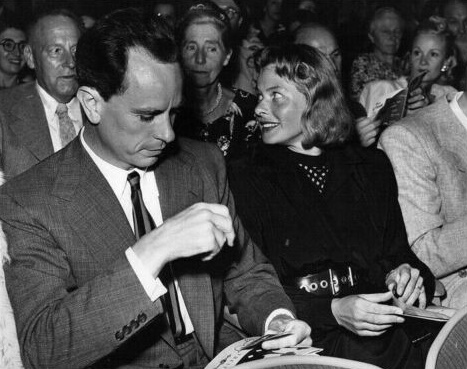
Ingrid Bergman and first husband Petter Lindström in the 1940s

=== Marriages and children ===
On 10 July 1937, at the age of 21, in Stöde, Bergman married a dentist, Petter Aron Lindström, who later became a neurosurgeon. The couple had one child, a daughter, Friedel Pia Lindström. After returning to the United States in 1940, she acted on Broadway before continuing to do films in Hollywood. The following year, her husband arrived from Sweden with Pia. Lindström stayed in Rochester, New York, where he studied medicine and surgery at the University of Rochester.

In between films, Bergman travelled to New York and stayed at their small rented stucco house, her visits lasting from a few days to four months. According to an article in Life, the "doctor regards himself as the undisputed head of the family, an idea that Ingrid accepts cheerfully". He insisted she draw the line between her professional life and her personal life, as he had a "professional dislike for being associated with the tinseled glamor of Hollywood". Lindström later moved to San Francisco, California, where he completed his internship at a private hospital, and they continued to spend time together when she could travel between filming. Lindström did not view Bergman as the rest of the world did. He thought she was too absorbed with her professional popularity and image, and was full of vanity. According to Bergman's biographer, Donald Spoto, Lindström managed her career and financial matters. He was very frugal with money. On 27 August 1945, two days before her 30th birthday, she (as Ingrid Lindstrom) and her husband both filed U.S. citizenship applications.

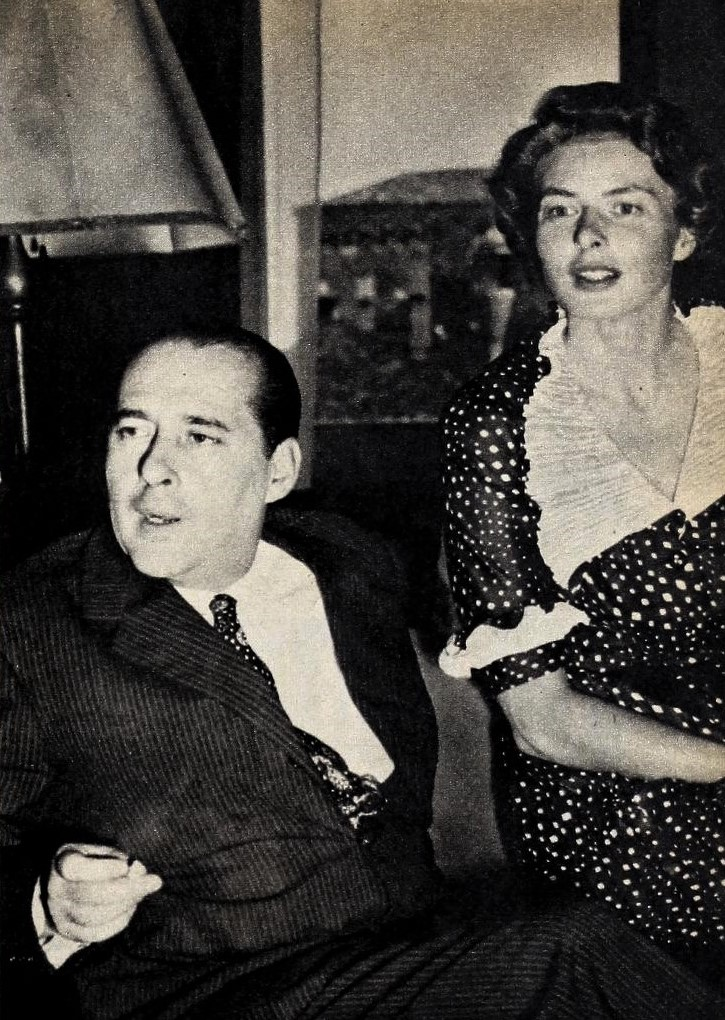
Rossellini and Bergman in Photoplay magazine, January 1953. Bergman's pregnancy was a scandal that rocked Hollywood

Lindström had been aware of his wife's affairs. When asked by the biographer why he did not ask for a divorce, he replied bluntly, "I lived with that because of her income." Bergman returned to Europe after the scandalous publicity surrounding her affair with Italian director Roberto Rossellini during the filming of Stromboli in 1950. She begged Lindström for a divorce and contact with their daughter Pia, but he refused.

In the same month Stromboli was released, she gave birth to a boy, Renato Roberto Ranaldo Giusto Giuseppe ("Robin") Rossellini (born 2 February 1950). A week after her son was born, she divorced Lindström under Mexican jurisdiction, and married Rossellini by proxy on 24 May 1950. On 18 June 1952, she gave birth to twin daughters Isotta Ingrid Rossellini and Isabella Rossellini. Isabella became an actress and model, and Isotta a professor of Italian literature. It was not until 1957 that Bergman was reunited with Pia in Rome. Her ex-husband, however, remained bitter towards Bergman.

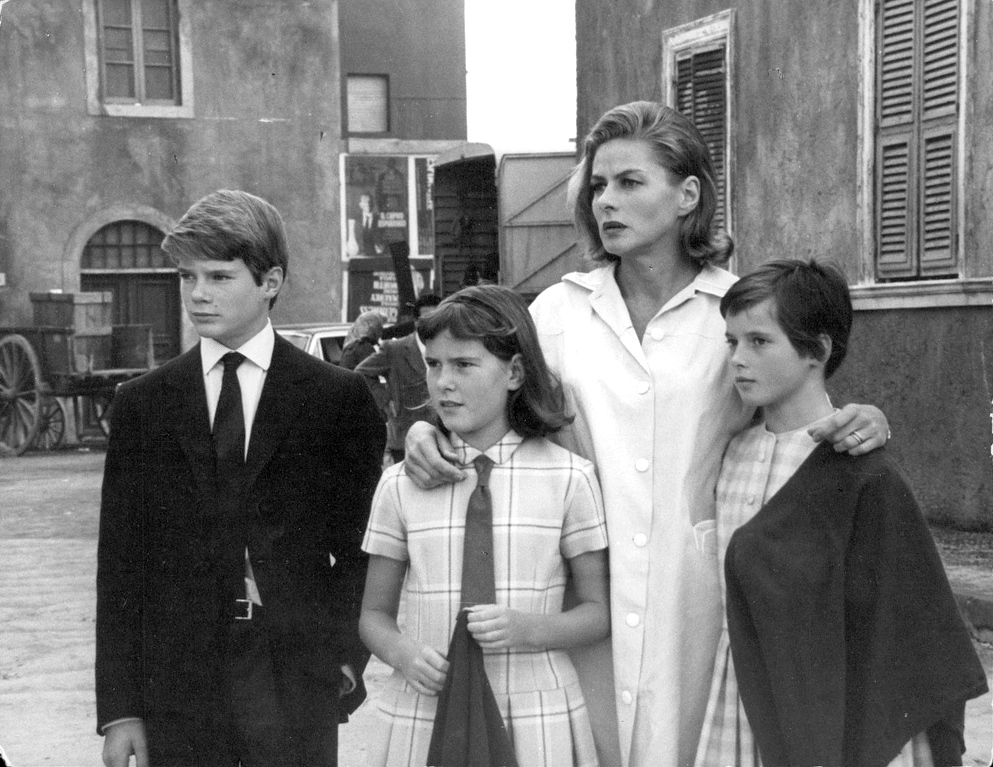
Ingrid Bergman with her three children by Rossellini, in 1963, on the filming set of The Visit

During the scandal, Bergman received letters of support from Cary Grant, Helen Hayes, Ernest Hemingway, John Steinbeck and other celebrities. The adultery and remarriage is remembered as a major sex scandal of 20th century Hollywood. It received an extraordinary amount of media attention in the U.S. and abroad, including Bergman's native Sweden. Bergman was treated harshly by the conservative Swedish press, with some journalists claiming she had destroyed the international reputation of Sweden. The scandal also took ethnic overtones, with Rossellini described as the over-sexed Latin lover. On the other hand, Bergman was defended by Swedish feminists, especially in 1955 when Bergman first returned to Sweden after the scandal, causing friction between conservative journalists and the emerging feminist movement. In the U.S., the scandal also took xenophobic turns. Sen. Edwin C. Johnson stated that "under the law, no alien guilty of turpitude can set foot on American soil again" and that Bergman had "deliberately exiled herself from this country that was so good to her". Isabella Rossellini said that "[..] she was chased out of America because they felt that foreigners and stars, we come to America, and then behave immorally and are bad examples to the younger generations." Although post-war social conservative morals stoked the public outrage, another factor was Bergman's on-screen image as a pure, saint-like character; she later commented: "People saw me in Joan of Arc, and declared me a saint. I'm not. I'm just a woman, another human being" and "It was because so many people, who knew me only on the screen, thought I was perfect and infallible and then were angry and disappointed that I wasn't ... A nun does not fall in love with an Italian."

Her marriage with Rossellini declined and eventually ended in divorce in 1957. Rossellini's cousin, Renzo Avanzo, was worried that Bergman would discourage Rossellini from making pictures he should be making. Rossellini didn't like her friends, fearing they would lure her back to Hollywood. He was possessive and would not allow Bergman to work for anyone else. In 1957, Rossellini had an affair with Sonali Das Gupta while filming in India. Bergman met with Indian Prime Minister Jawaharlal Nehru in London, to get permission for Rossellini to leave India.

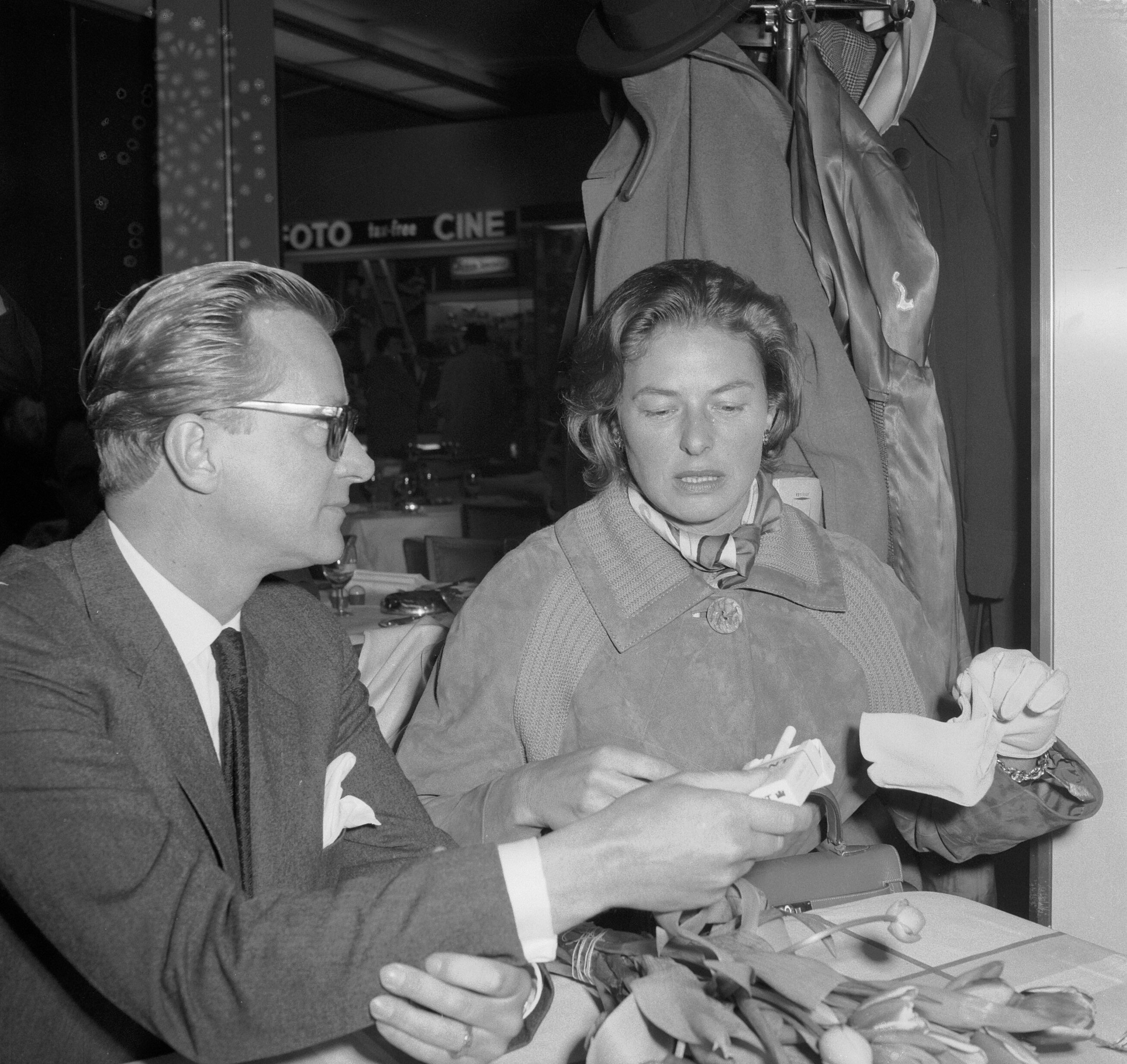
Bergman with third husband, theatre producer, Lars Schmidt

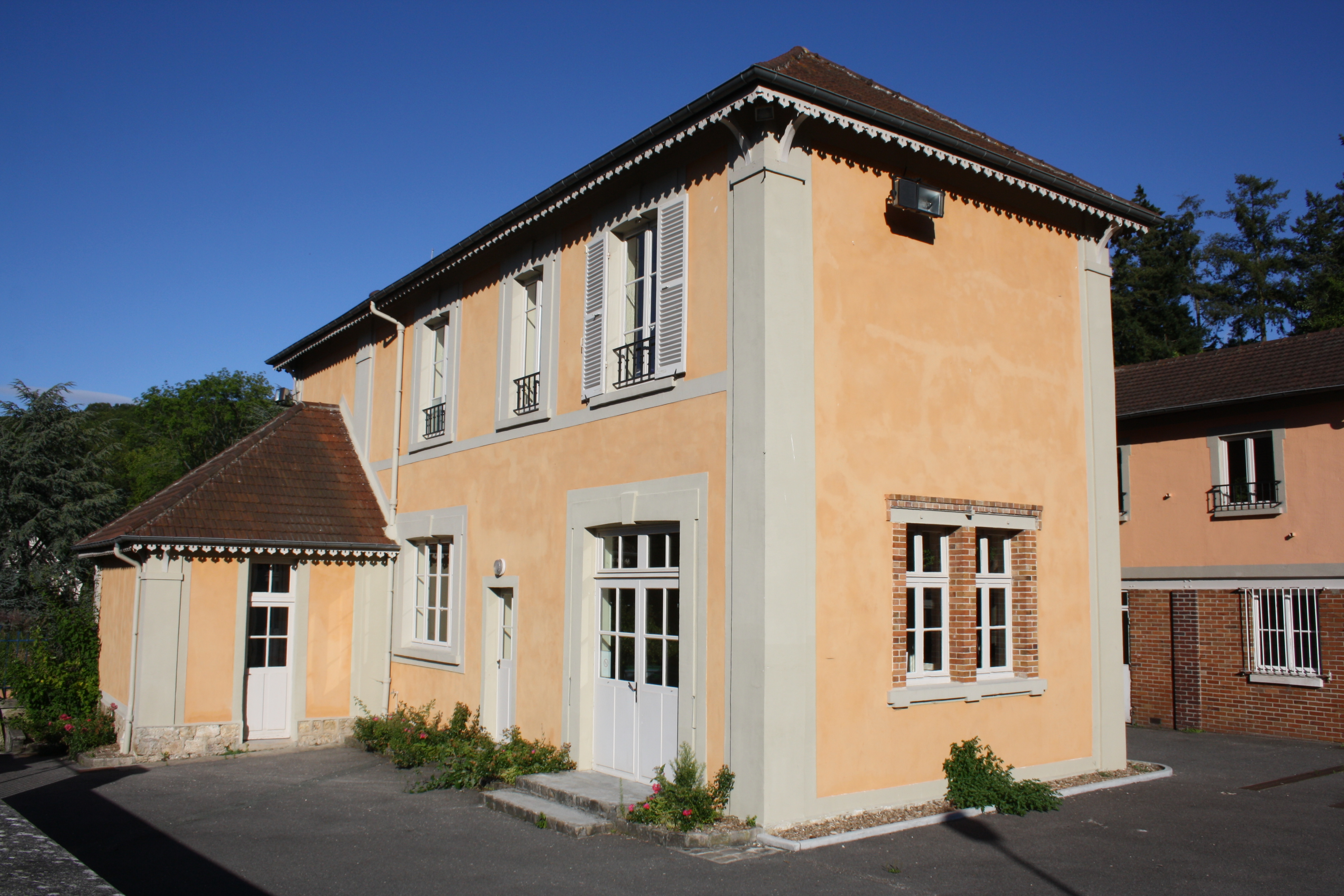
Bergman's former residence in Choisel, where she lived with Lars Schmidt in the 60s

On 21 December 1958, Bergman married Lars Schmidt, a theatrical entrepreneur from a wealthy Swedish shipping family. She met Schmidt through her publicist, Kay Brown. The couple and their children spent summers together in Danholmen, Lars's private island off the coast of Sweden. They also stayed at Choisel near Paris. Bergman traveled frequently for filming, while Lars produced plays and television shows all over Europe, and their work schedules put a strain on their marriage. While vacationing with Schmidt in Monte Gordo beach in Algarve, Portugal in 1963, right after making the TV movie Hedda Gabler, she received a ticket for wearing a too-revealing bikini by the modesty standards of conservative Portugal. After almost two decades of marriage, the couple divorced in 1975. Nonetheless, Lars was by her side when she died on 29 August 1982, her 67th birthday.

One of Bergman's grandchildren is Elettra Rossellini Wiedemann.

In October 1978, Bergman gave an interview on her last film role, Autumn Sonata, which explored the relationship between a mother and daughter. She played a classical concert pianist, who values her career more than motherhood and caring for her two daughters. Bergman said: "A lot of it is what I have lived through, leaving my children, having a career." She recalled instances in her own life, "when she had to pry her children's arms from around her neck, 'and then go away' to advance her career." In her will, the bulk of her estate was divided among her four children, with some provision for Rossellini's niece Fiorella, Bergman's maid in Rome, and her agent's daughter Kate Brown.

=== Relationships ===
Bergman had affairs with her directors and co-stars in the 1940s. Spencer Tracy and Bergman briefly dated during the filming of Dr. Jekyll and Mr. Hyde. She later had an affair with Gary Cooper while shooting For Whom the Bell Tolls. Cooper said, "No one loved me more than Ingrid Bergman, but the day after filming concluded, I couldn't even get her on the phone." Jeanine Basinger writes, [Victor] "Fleming fell deeply in love with the irresistible Swede and never really got over it". While directing his final film Joan of Arc, he was completely enthralled with Bergman. She had a brief affair with musician Larry Adler when she was travelling across Europe entertaining the troops in 1945. In Anthony Quinn's autobiography, he mentions his sexual relationship with Bergman, among his many other affairs. Howard Hughes was also quite taken by Bergman. They met through Cary Grant and Irene Selznick. He phoned one day to inform her that he had just bought RKO as a present for her.

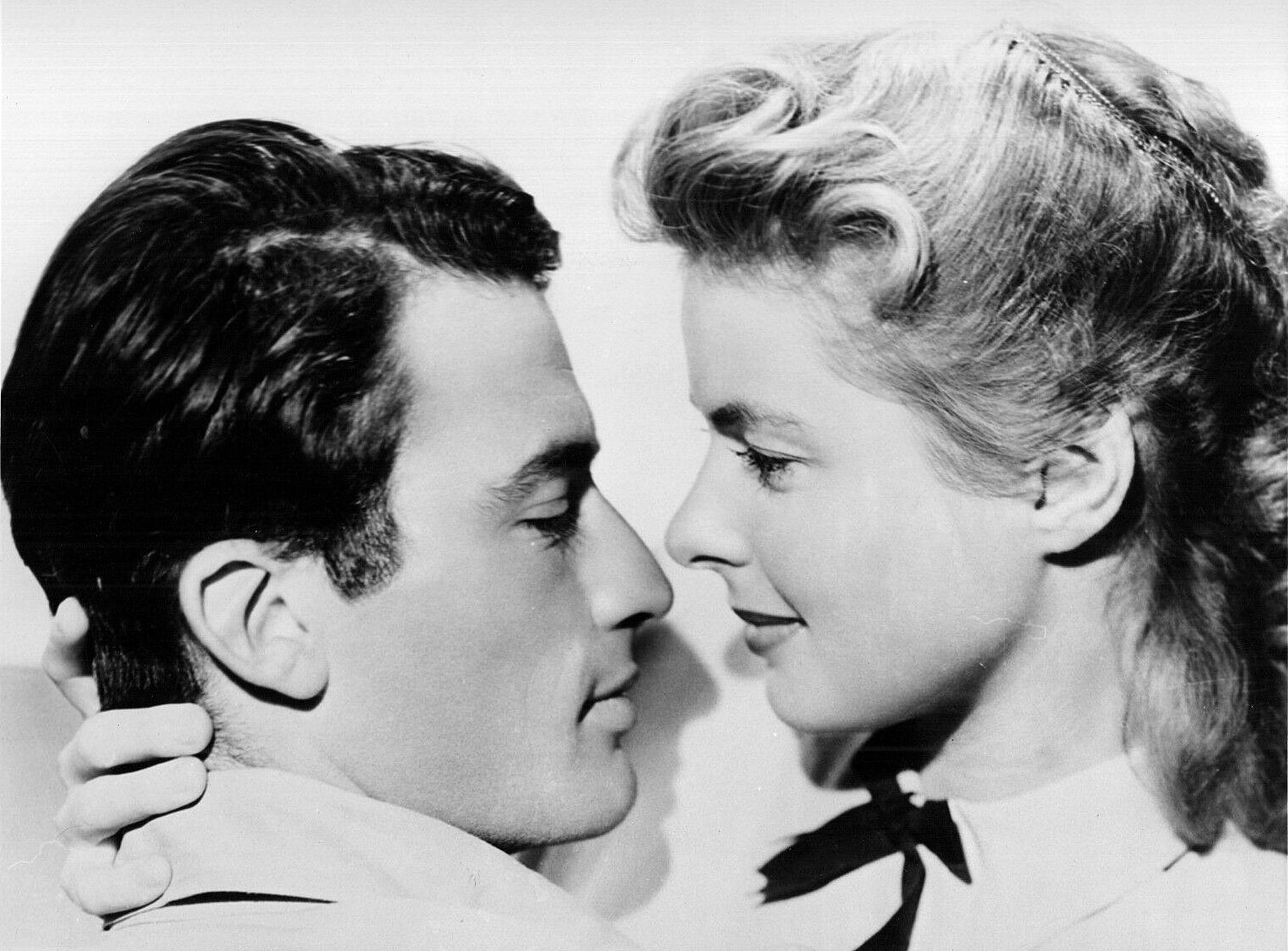
Gregory Peck admitted to having an affair with Bergman during the making of the 1945 film Spellbound.

During her marriage to Lindström, Bergman also had affairs with the photographer Robert Capa and actor Gregory Peck. It was through Bergman's autobiography that her affair with Capa became known.^{p. 176} In June 1945, Bergman was passing through Paris, on her way to Berlin to entertain American soldiers. In response to a dinner invitation she met Capa and novelist Irwin Shaw. By her account, they had a wonderful evening. The next day, she departed for Berlin. Two months later, Capa was in Berlin, photographing ruins, and they met again. Distressed over her marriage to Lindström, she fell in love with Capa, and wished to leave her husband. During their months together in Berlin, Capa made enough money to follow Bergman back to Hollywood. Although Life magazine assigned him to cover Bergman, he was unhappy with the "frivolity" of Hollywood.

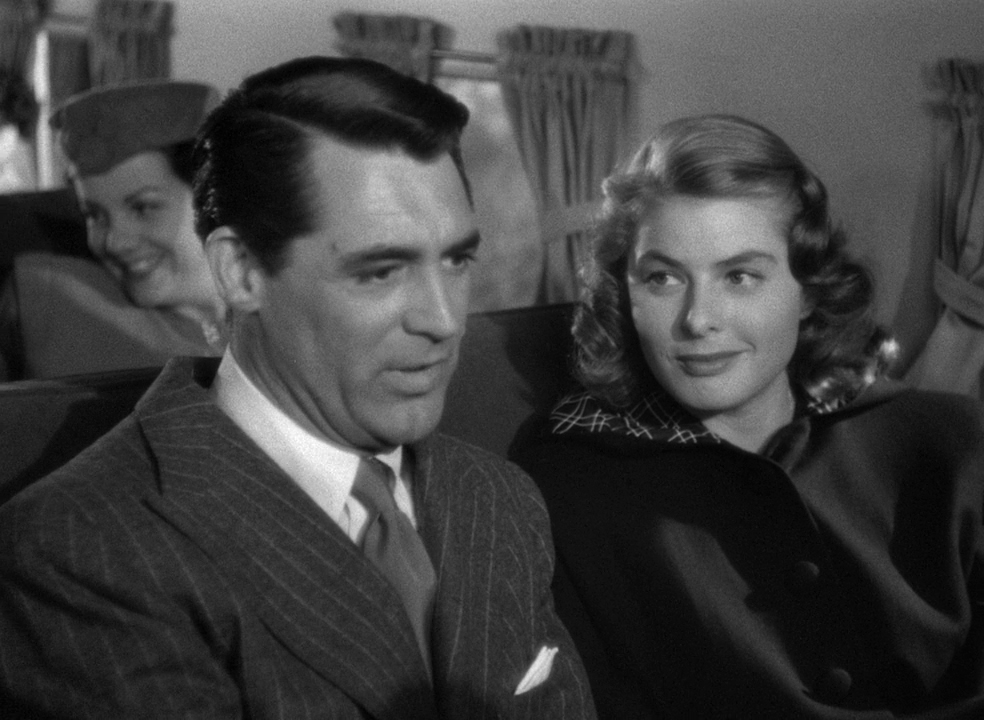
Ingrid Bergman and Cary Grant had a close friendship, and he accepted her Academy Award on her behalf for her role in Anastasia at the 29th Academy Awards ceremony.

Bergman's brief affair with Spellbound co-star Gregory Peck was kept private until Peck confessed it to Brad Darrach of People in an interview five years after Bergman's death. Peck said, "All I can say is that I had a real love for her (Bergman), and I think that's where I ought to stop ... I was young. She was young. We were involved for weeks in close and intense work."

Bergman was a Lutheran, once saying of herself, "I'm tall, Swedish, and Lutheran".

Later, her daughter Isabella Rossellini said: "She showed that women are independent, that women want to tell their own story, want to take initiative, but sometimes, they can't because sometimes, our social culture doesn't allow women to break away from certain rules."

After the making of Intermezzo: A Love Story (1939), producer David O. Selznick and his wife Irene became friends with Bergman and remained so throughout her career. Bergman also formed a lifelong friendship with her Notorious co-star, Cary Grant. They met briefly in 1938 at a party thrown by Selznick. Scott Eyman in his book, Cary Grant: A Brilliant Disguise, wrote: "Grant found that he liked Ingrid Bergman a great deal.... She was beautiful, but lots of actresses are beautiful. What made Bergman special was her indifference to her looks, her clothes, to everything except her art." Bergman and Hitchcock also formed a sustained friendship out of mutual admiration.

At 5 feet 9 inches (1.75 m), she was taller than some of her male costars, causing occasional problems. She was two inches (5 cm) taller than Humphrey Bogart, and Bogart was reported as standing on blocks or sitting on cushions in their scenes together in Casablanca. Bergman was also taller than Claude Rains, and for the scenes in Notorious where Rains and Bergman were to walk hand-in-hand, Hitchcock devised a system of ramps that boosted Rains's height below camera level, and Rains also wore elevator shoes in some scenes.

== Illness and death ==
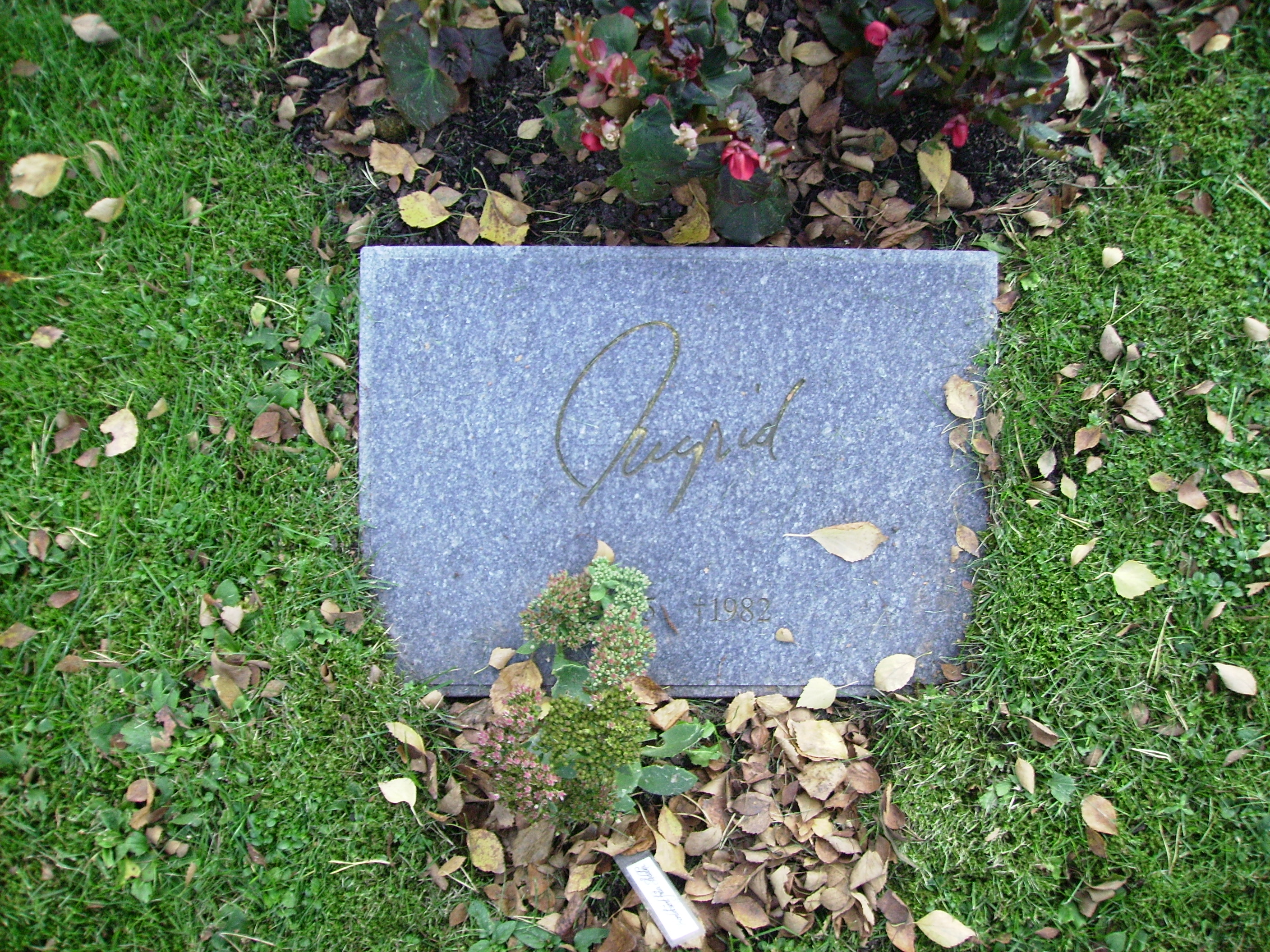
Bergman's grave at Norra Begravningsplatsen

During the run of The Constant Wife in London, Bergman discovered a hard lump under her left breast. The lump was removed on 15 June 1974 in a London clinic. While working on Autumn Sonata, Bergman discovered another lump, and flew back to London for another surgery. Afterward, she began rehearsals for Waters of the Moon (1978).

Despite her illness, she agreed to play Golda Meir in 1981, then retired to her apartment in Cheyne Gardens, London, where she underwent chemotherapy. As photographers camped outside on the pavement, she refrained from approaching the front window. The cancer had spread to her spine, collapsing her twelfth vertebra; her right lung no longer functioned, and only a small part of her left lung had not collapsed.

Bergman died in London on 29 August 1982, at midnight on her 67th birthday. Her ex-husband Lars Schmidt and three other people were present, having drunk their last toast to her hours earlier. A copy of The Little Prince was at her bedside, opened to a page near the end. The memorial service was held in St Martin-in-the-Fields church in October with 1,200 mourners. In attendance were her children, the Rossellinis, and relatives from Sweden, as well as numerous fellow actors and costars, including Liv Ullmann, Sir John Gielgud, Dame Wendy Hiller, Birgit Nilsson and Joss Ackland. As part of the service, quotations from Shakespeare were read. Musical selections included "This Old Man" from The Inn of the Sixth Happiness, and "As Time Goes By". Bergman's grandson, Justin Daly, recalled the event as hundreds of photographers were waiting and taking pictures, when a camera hit him on the head: "In the middle of all this chaos, I could sense that she wasn't just my grandmother. She belonged to everyone else. She belonged to the world."

Ingrid Bergman was cremated at a private ceremony attended only by close relatives and five friends at Kensal Green Cemetery, London, and her ashes were taken to Sweden. Most were scattered in the sea around the islet of Dannholmen, near the fishing village of Fjällbacka in Bohuslän. The location is on the west coast of Sweden, a place where she had spent most of the summers from 1958 until her death. The remainder of her ashes were placed next to her parents' ashes in Norra Begravningsplatsen (Northern Cemetery or Burial Place), Stockholm, Sweden.

== Acting style, public image and screen persona ==
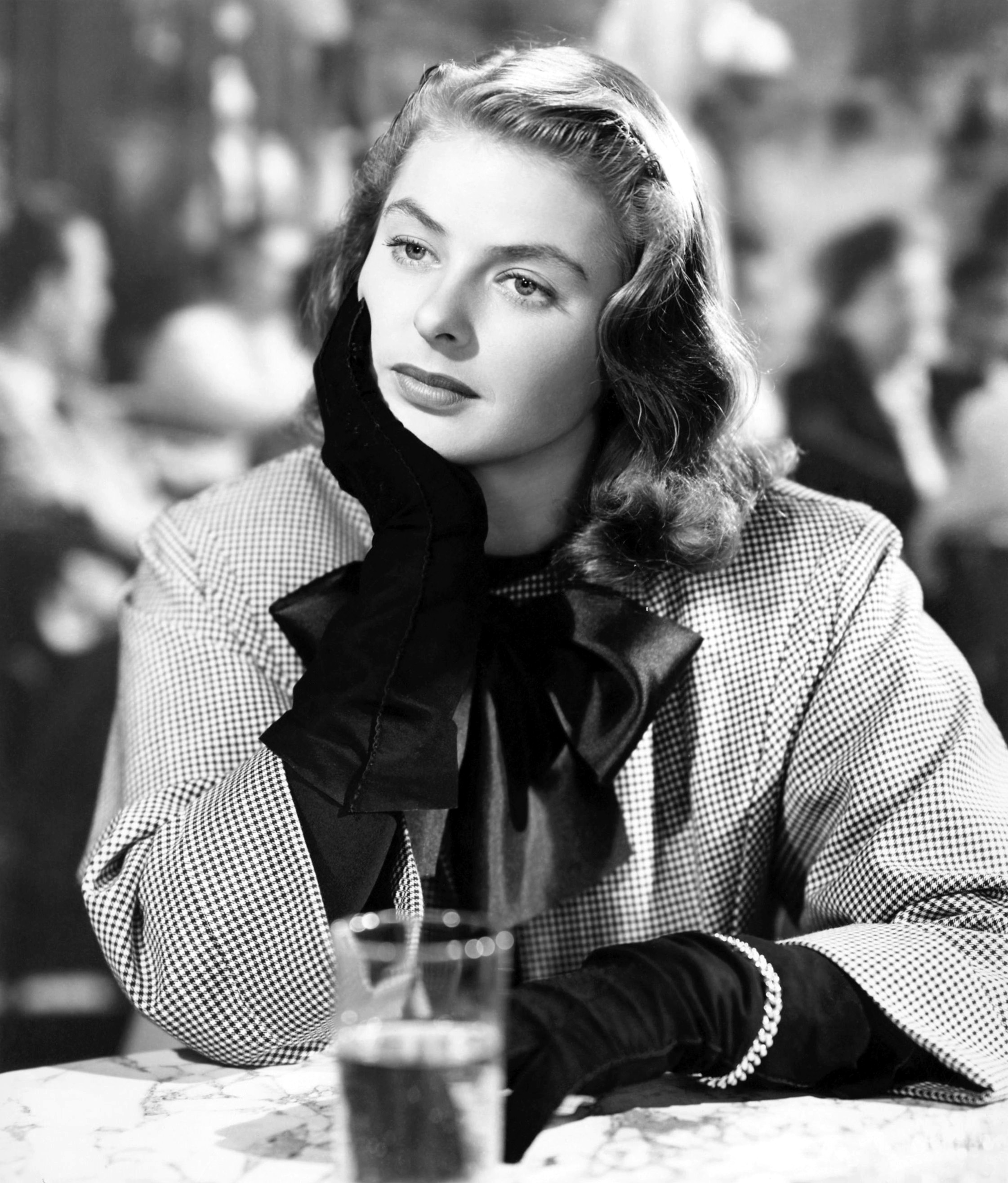
Ingrid Bergman in Notorious (1946). American film critic Dan Callahan called Bergman "The great female Hitchcock actor".

According to the St. James Encyclopedia of Popular Culture, upon her arrival in the U.S. Bergman quickly became "the ideal of American womanhood" and a contender for Hollywood's greatest leading actress. David O. Selznick once called her "the most completely conscientious actress" with whom he had ever worked.

Bergman was often associated with vulnerable yet strong characters who were in love but were also troubled by anxiety and fear. As preparation for Gaslight she went to a mental hospital and observed a particular patient. For A Woman Called Golda she reviewed tapes in order to master Meir's mannerisms. In Autumn Sonata, she moves across the screen like a caged animal but always keeps a ladylike composure that makes her words even more "silent but deathly". Bergman could be rigid and stubborn in her acting approach. Ingmar Bergman stated that they argued frequently, on set. "She went to a limit and objected to go beyond the limit." Jan Göransson of the Swedish Film Institute described Bergman as stubborn and loved to question her directors, whose innovative ideas about acting eventually won her over.

Bergman's ability to instantly change emotions was one of her greatest talents. Funing Tang from the University of Miami asserted, "even a moment of reticence, a little glance, or even an eye movement can alter the film's direction and provide her film and character with suspense, ambiguity and mysteriousness, which are rooted in her singular characteristics."

Roger Ebert echoed the same observation when he cited that Bergman has her way of looking into a man's face. He added: "She doesn't simply gaze at his eyes, as so many actresses do, their thoughts on the next line of dialogue. She peers into the eyes, searching for meaning and clues, and when she is in a close two-shot with an actor, watch the way her own eyes reflect the most minute changes in his expression."

For writer Susan Kerr, Bergman might have the greatest downcast eyes in history. "She got her greatest effects in Casablanca and Gaslight and Spellbound and Notorious by swooping her eyes down to the floor and darting them back and forth, as if watching a mouse scurry across the room", Kerr wrote.

Of course, some of Ingrid's pictures in those early American years were not masterpieces, but I remember very clearly that whatever she did I was always fascinated by her face. In her face-the skin-the eyes-the mouth-especially the mouth. There was this very strange radiance and an enormous erotic attraction. It had nothing to do with the body, but in the relationship between her mouth, her skin, and her eyes.

— Ingmar Bergman on Ingrid Bergman

According to Stardom and the Aesthetics of Neorealism: Ingrid Bergman in Rossellini's Italy, Alfred Hitchcock was responsible for transforming Bergman's screen persona towards "less is more". He coaxed her to be more understated and neutral, while his camera concentrated the expression in the micro-movement of her face. Much of his work with her involved efforts to quell her expressiveness, gestures and body movements. Susan White, one of the contributing authors in A Companion to Alfred Hitchcock, argued that while Bergman was one of his favorite collaborators, she is not the quintessential Hitchcock blonde. She is more like "a resistant and defiant blonde", in contrast to the Grace Kelly type (who was) more malleable and conformative. For Bergman, the face became a central aspect to her persona. In many of her films, her body is covered up in what are often elaborate costumes; nun's habits, doctor's coats, soldier's armors, and Victorian dresses. The technique of chiaroscuro had been used in many of Bergman's films to capture the ambience and the emotional turmoils of her characters through her face. In the case of Casablanca, shadows and lighting were used to make her face look thinner. Peter Byrnes of The Sydney Morning Herald wrote that Casablanca is perhaps the world's best close-up movie, in which he added, "after the initial set-up, they just keep coming, a series of stunningly emotional close-ups to die for". Byrnes asserted that these close-ups are the start of the seduction process between Bergman and the audience. He added, "She is so beautiful, and so beautifully lit, that the audience feels they've had their money's worth already." Bergman's daughter, Pia Lindstrom felt that her mother gave some of her best acting in her later films once her mother had finally been freed of her youthful, radiant physical beauty.

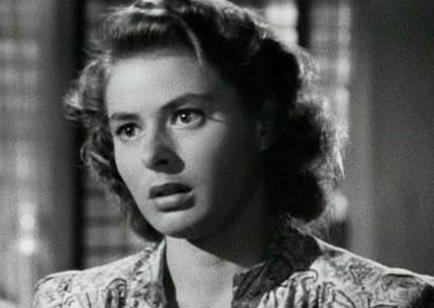
Bergman as Ilsa Lund in Casablanca, her most famous role.

Prominent film writer Dan Callahan commented that there is an element of suspense when watching how Bergman – who was a polyglot – emotes, enhanced by her voice and the way she read her lines. He wrote that Bergman was less effective while speaking in French and German, as if she were void of creative energy. Angelica Jade Bastién of Vulture echoed the same sentiment, that Bergman's secret weapon is her voice and her accent.

Bergman portrayed women in extra-marital affairs in Intermezzo and Casablanca, prostitutes in Arch of Triumph and Dr Jekyll and Mr Hyde, and a villainess in Saratoga Trunk. Nonetheless, the public seemed to believe that Bergman's off-screen persona was similar to the saintly characters she played in Joan of Arc and The Bells of St. Mary's. Although the preponderance of "fallen woman" roles did not besmirch Bergman's saintly status, the publicized affair with Rossellini resulted in a public sense of betrayal. David O. Selznick testified later, "I'm afraid I'm responsible for the public's image of her as Saint Ingrid. We deliberately built her up as the normal, healthy, unneurotic career woman, devoid of scandal and with an idyllic home life. I guess that backfired later."

== Legacy ==
The news of Bergman's death was widely reported across the United States and Europe. Both the Los Angeles Times and the New York Post printed front page notices. The New York Post announcement was in bold red. The New York Times stated: "Ingrid Bergman, Winner of Three Oscars Is Dead." The Washington Post paid its tribute in an article that called her "an actress whose innocent yet provocative beauty made her one of the great stars of stage and screen".

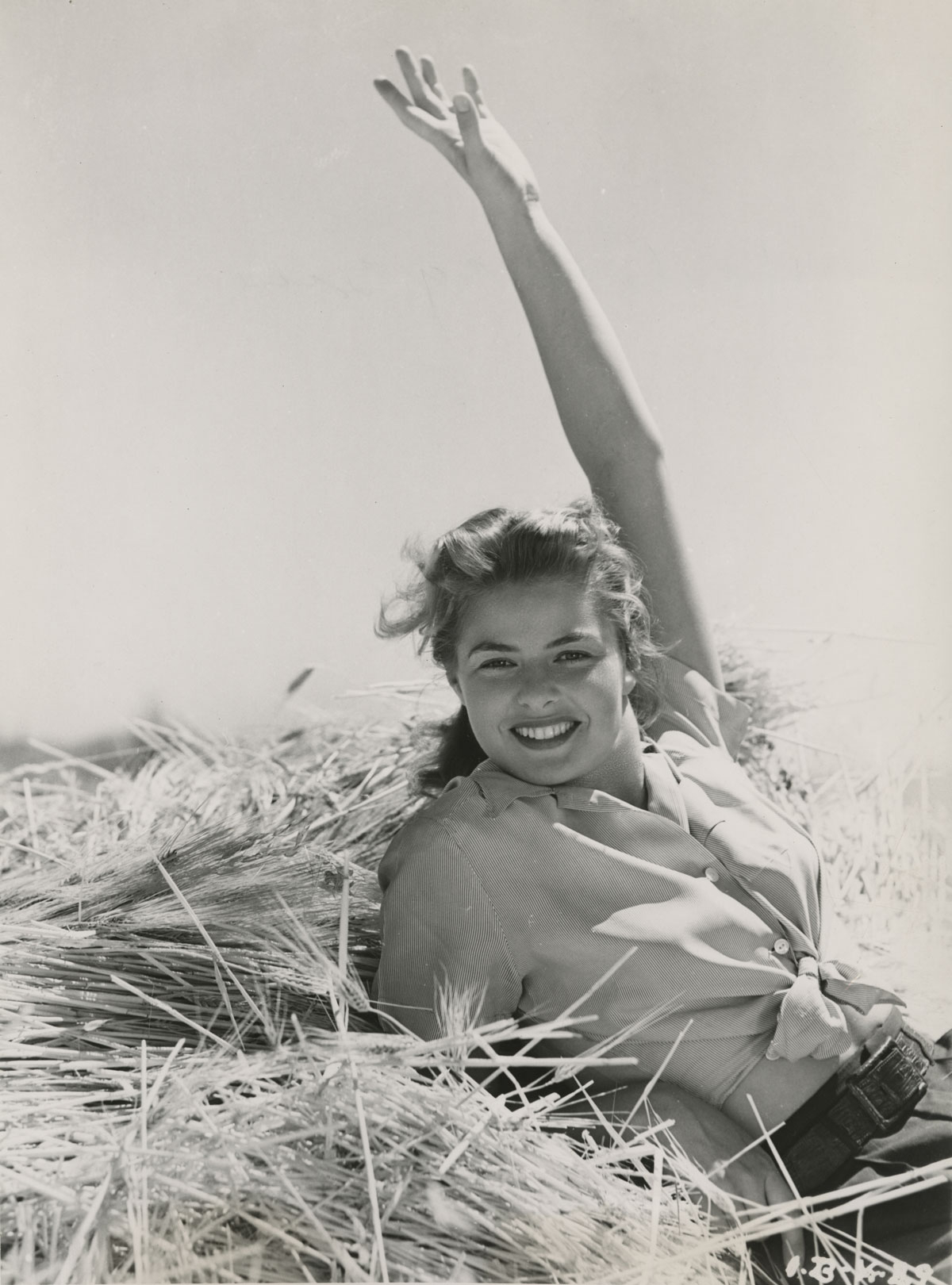
Bergman in a magazine photo shoot in the 1940s

Bergman was mourned by many, especially her fellow co-stars. They praised her tenacity, spirit, and warmth. Joseph Cotten considered her a great friend and a great actress. Paul Henreid commented: "She was so terribly beautiful in her youth. She was a very strong lady with great desires and emotions and she led a colorful life." Liv Ullmann said that she would mourn her because "She made me very proud to be a woman," she added. Leonard Nimoy praised her tenacity and courage. "I developed enormous respect for her as a person and talent. She was a marvelous lady and actress".

On 30 August 1983, stars, friends and family came to Venice Film Festival to honour the late Bergman on the first anniversary of her death. Among the many guests were Gregory Peck, Walter Matthau, Audrey Hepburn, Roger Moore, Charlton Heston, Prince Albert of Monaco, Claudette Colbert and Olivia de Havilland. They dined and wined for five days while remembering Bergman and the legacy she left behind.

Despite suffering from cancer for eight years, Bergman continued her career and won international honours for her final roles. "Her spirit triumphed with remarkable grace and courage", added biographer Donald Spoto. Director George Cukor once summed up her contributions to the film media when he said to her, "Do you know what I especially love about you, Ingrid, my dear? I can sum it up as your naturalness. The camera loves your beauty, your acting, and your individuality. A star must have individuality. It makes you a great star."

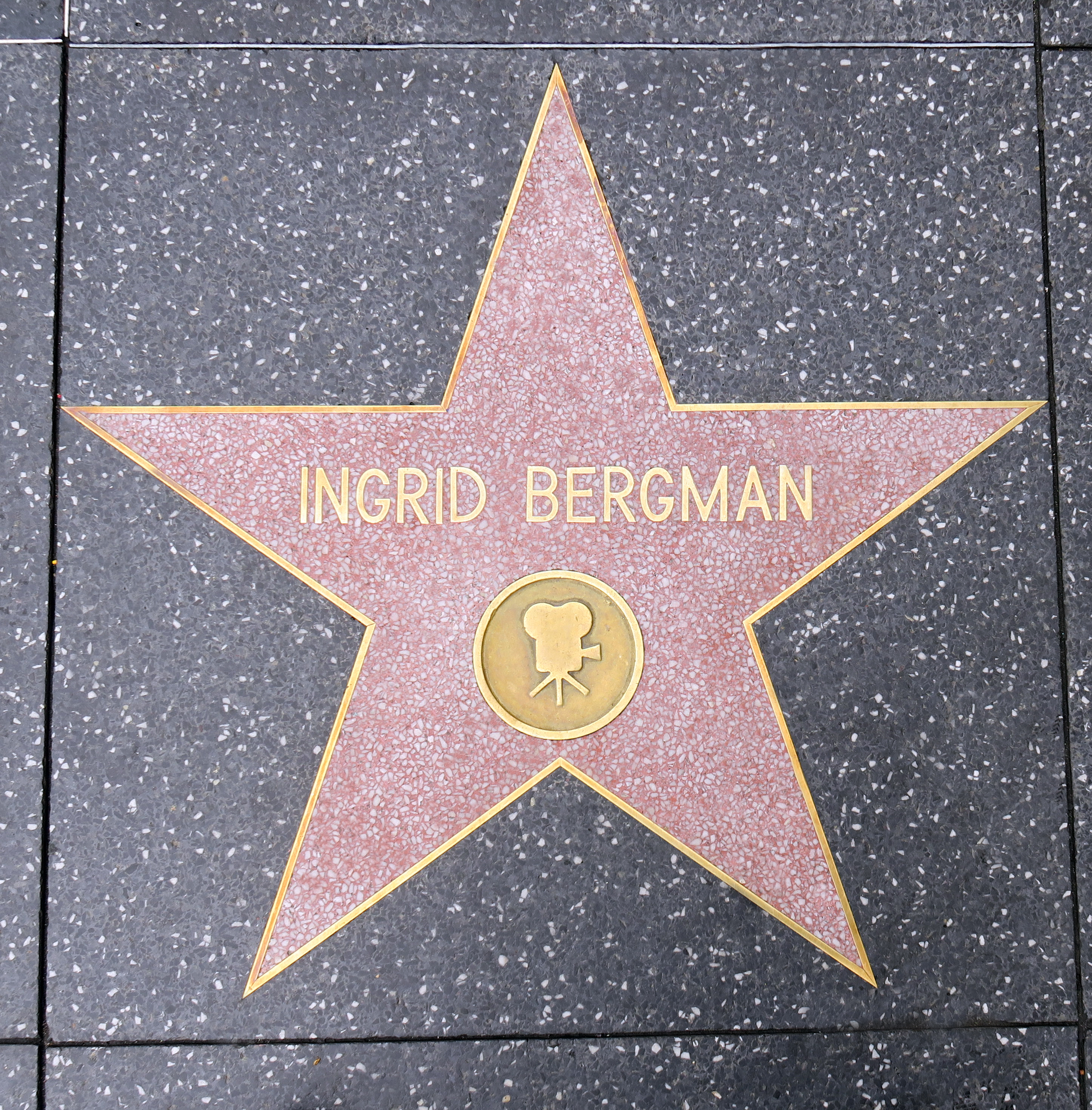
Ingrid Bergman star on Hollywood Walk of Fame

Writing about her first years in Hollywood, Life stated that "All Bergman vehicles are blessed", and "they all go speedily and happily, with no temperament from the leading lady". She was "completely pleased" with the management of her early career by David O. Selznick, who always found excellent dramatic roles for her to play, and equally satisfied with her salary, once saying, "I am an actress, and I am interested in acting, not in making money." Life adds that "she has greater versatility than any actress on the American screen ... Her roles have demanded an adaptability and sensitiveness of characterization to which few actresses could rise".

Biographer Donald Spoto said she was "arguably the most international star in the history of entertainment". After her American film debut in the film Intermezzo: A Love Story (1939), Hollywood saw her as a unique actress who was completely natural in style, and without need for much make-up. Film critic James Agee wrote that she "not only bears a startling resemblance to an imaginable human being; she really knows how to act, in a blend of poetic grace with quiet realism".

Film historian David Thomson, said she "always strove to be a 'true' woman", and many filmgoers identified with her:

There was a time in the early and mid-1940s when Bergman commanded a kind of love in America that has been hardly ever matched. In turn, it was the strength of that affection that animated the "scandal" when she behaved like an impetuous and ambitious actress instead of a saint.

According to her daughter Isabella Rossellini, her mother had a deep sense of freedom and independence. She then added: "She was able to integrate so many cultures... she is not even American but she is totally part of American culture like she is totally part of the Swedish, Italian, French, European film making."

Wesleyan University hosts the "Ingrid Bergman Collection" of Bergman's personal papers, scripts, awards, portraits, photos, scrapbooks, costumes, legal papers, financial records, stills, clippings and memorabilia.

=== Activism ===
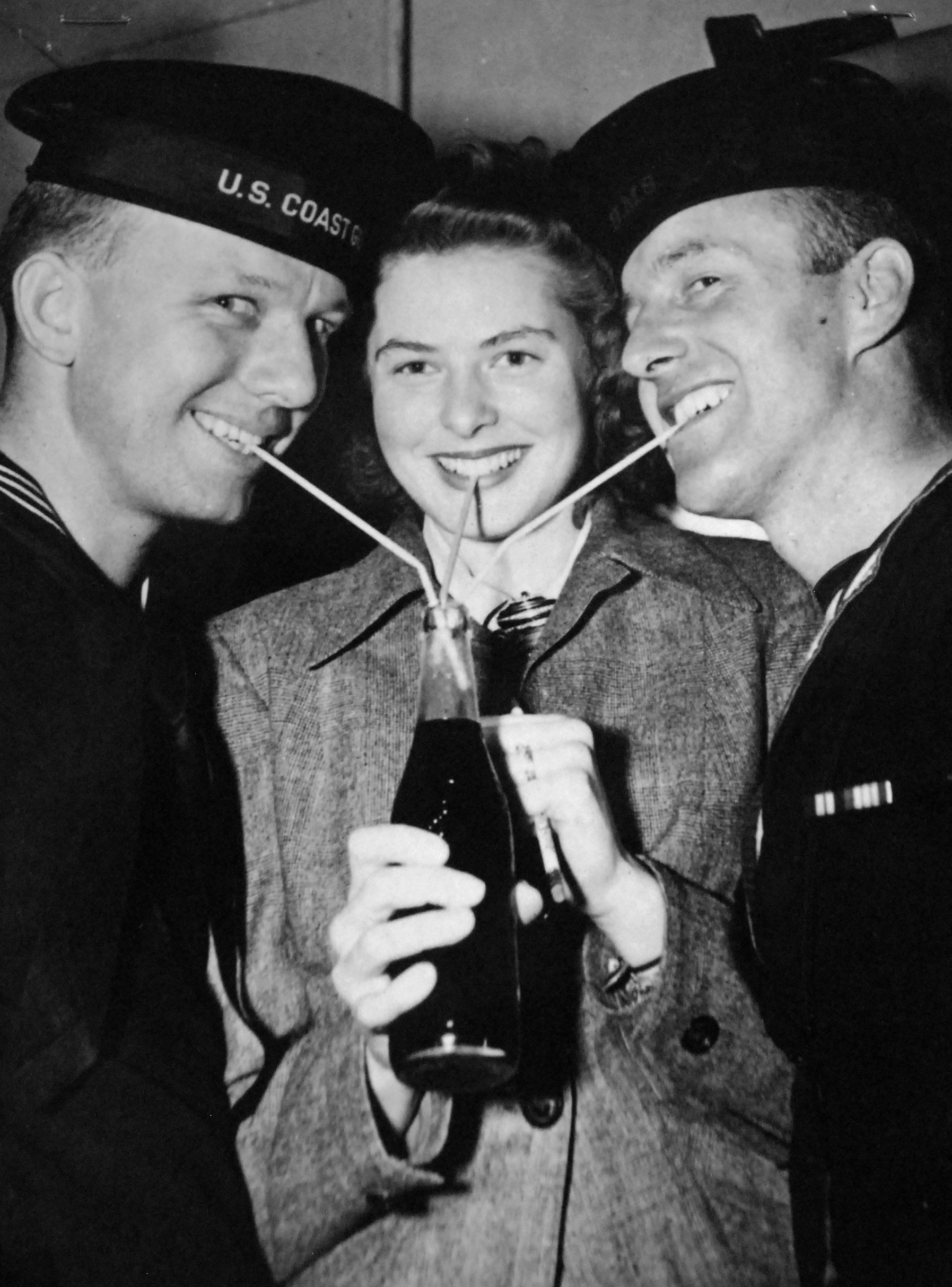
Bergman and two seamen of the United Nations—a U.S. Coast Guardsman, (left), and a Royal Navy (British) sailor—take a sip of a drink through three straws, at New York City's Stage Door Canteen that distributed cigarettes, sandwiches, coffee and other refreshments to Allied servicemen.

During a 1946 press conference in Washington, D.C. for the promotion of the play Joan of Lorraine, she protested to the newspapers regarding racial segregation after seeing it first hand at Lisner Auditorium, the theater where she was working. This led to significant publicity and some hate mail. A bust of Bergman has been placed outside the Lisner Auditorium, in recognition of her protest, and as a reminder of the venue's segregated past.

Bergman went to Alaska during World War II to entertain U.S. Army troops. Soon after the war ended, she also went to Europe for the same purpose, where she was able to see the devastation caused by the war. She arrived in Paris on 6 June 1945 with Jack Benny, Larry Adler and Martha Tilton where they stayed at The Ritz Hotel. Bergman's performance was rather limited; she could not sing nor play an instrument and she did not have Jack Benny's humor. In Kassel, she ran offstage in tears. When they went to see a concentration camp, she stayed behind. After the onset of World War II, Bergman felt guilt for her initial dismissal of the Nazi state in Germany. According to her biographer Charlotte Chandler, she had at first considered the Nazis only a "temporary aberration, 'too foolish to be taken seriously'. She believed Germany would not start a war." Bergman felt that "the good people there would not permit it". Chandler adds that she "felt guilty all the rest of her life because when she was in Germany at the end of the war, she had been afraid to go with others to witness the atrocities of the Nazi extermination camps".

=== Centennial celebration ===
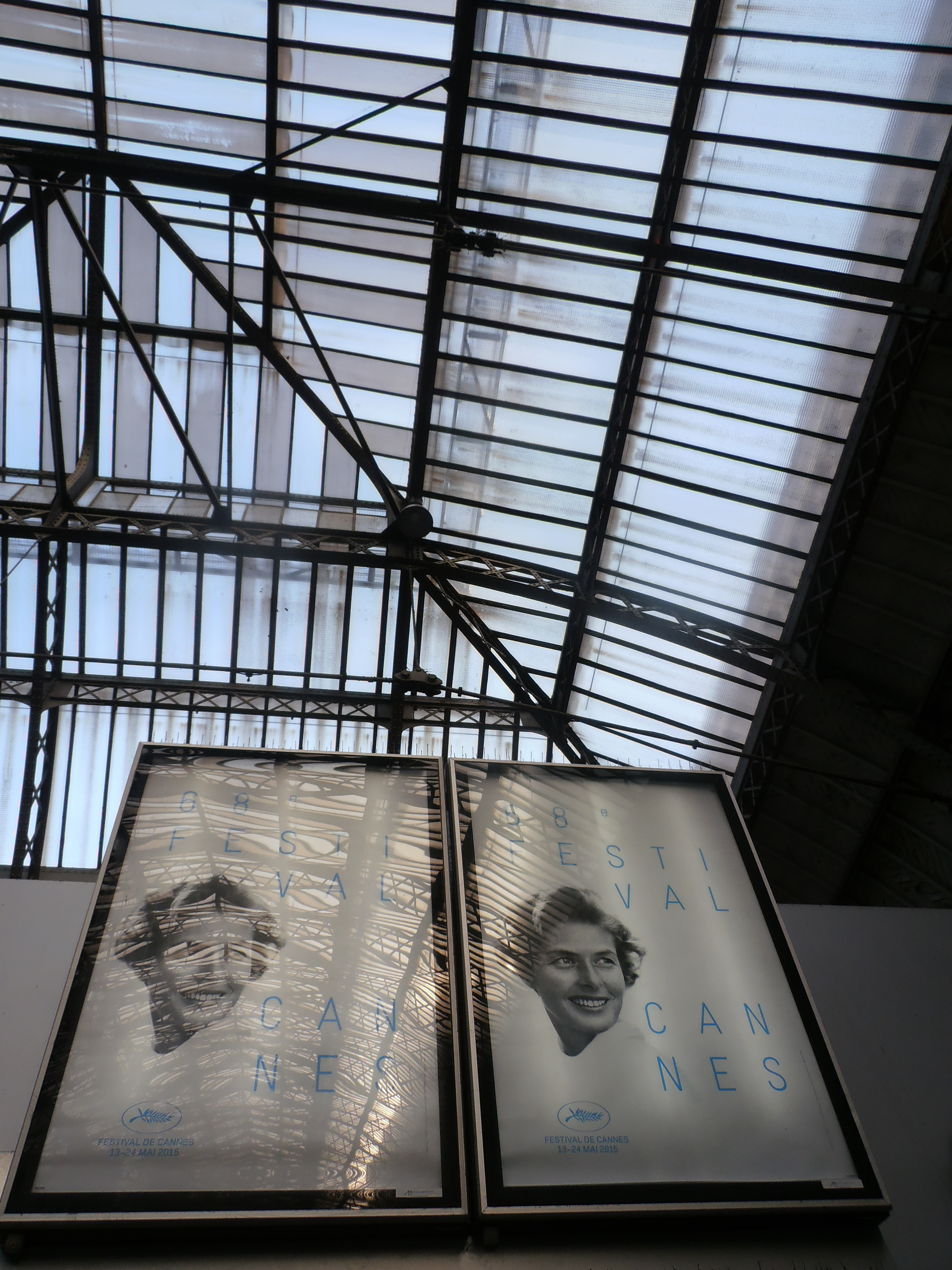
Cannes poster of Bergman (2015)

In 2015, to celebrate the Bergman centennial, exhibitions, film screenings, books, documentaries and seminars were presented by various institutions. The Museum of Modern Art (MOMA) held a screening of her films, chosen and introduced by her children. AFI Silver Theatre and Cultural Center presented an extensive retrospective of her Hollywood and Italian films. University of California, Berkeley hosted a lecture, where journalist and film critic, Ulrika Knutson called Bergman "a pioneering feminist". Toronto International Film Festival continued with Notorious: Celebrating the Ingrid Bergman Centenary which featured a series of her best-known films. Ingrid Bergman at BAM was screened at Brooklyn Academy of Music's Rose Cinemas. BAMcinématek presented "Ingrid Bergman Tribute" on 12 September 2015, an event co-hosted by Isabella Rossellini and Jeremy Irons, which featured a live reading by Rossellini and Irons taken from Bergman's personal letters. The Plaza Cinema & Media Arts Center in Patchogue, New York held a special screening of Bergman's films. Screenings and tributes occurred in other cities; London, Paris, Madrid, Rome, Tokyo and Melbourne. The Bohuslän Museum in Uddevalla, north of Gothenburg opened an exhibition titled "Ingrid Bergman in Fjällbacka". A pictorial book titled Ingrid Bergman: A Life in Pictures was published by the Bergman estate.

Ingrid Bergman: In Her Own Words, is a 2015 Swedish documentary film, directed by Stig Björkman, which was made to celebrate her centennial. It was screened in the Cannes Classics section at the 2015 Cannes Film Festival, where it received a special mention for L'Œil d'or. A photograph of Bergman, by David Seymour was featured as the main poster at Cannes. The festival described Bergman as a "modern icon, an emancipated woman, an intrepid actress, and a figurehead for the new realism". The New York Film Festival and The Tokyo International Film Festival also presented the documentary.

At the 2015 Vancouver International Film Festival, the film was chosen as "Most Popular International Documentary", based on audience balloting. The film "loses no chance to illuminate the independence and courage she showed in her private life". Although the viewer may pronounce judgement on " Bergman's free-wheeling, non-conformist maternal lifestyle, there can be no doubt about her determination and professional commitment." Ending with her last screen appearance in Autumn Sonata in 1978, "Bjorkman leaves behind the image of a uniquely strong, independent woman whose relaxed modernity was way ahead of its time."

To celebrate the same occasion, the U.S. Postal Service and Posten AB of Sweden, jointly issued commemorative stamps in Bergman's honor. The stamp art features a circa 1940 image of Bergman taken by László Willinger, with a colorized still of Bergman from Casablanca as the selvage photograph. Her daughter, Pia Lindstrom commented, "I think she would be very surprised that she is on a U.S. stamp and I know she would think it is great fun."

=== Biographical stage plays ===
Bergman was portrayed by her daughter, Isabella Rossellini in My Dad is 100 years Old (2005). In 2015, Notorious, a play based on Hitchcock's Notorious was staged at The Gothenburg Opera. Bergman's Italian period has been dramatised on stage in the musical play which is titled, Camera; The Musical About Ingrid Bergman. It was written by Jan-Erik Sääf and Staffan Aspegren and performed in Stockholm, Sweden.

=== In popular culture ===
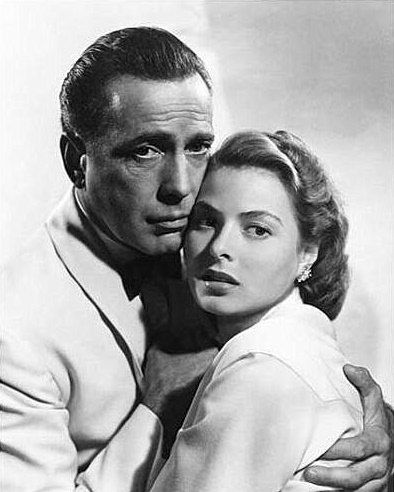
Bogart and Bergman in Casablanca, an image that has been parodied

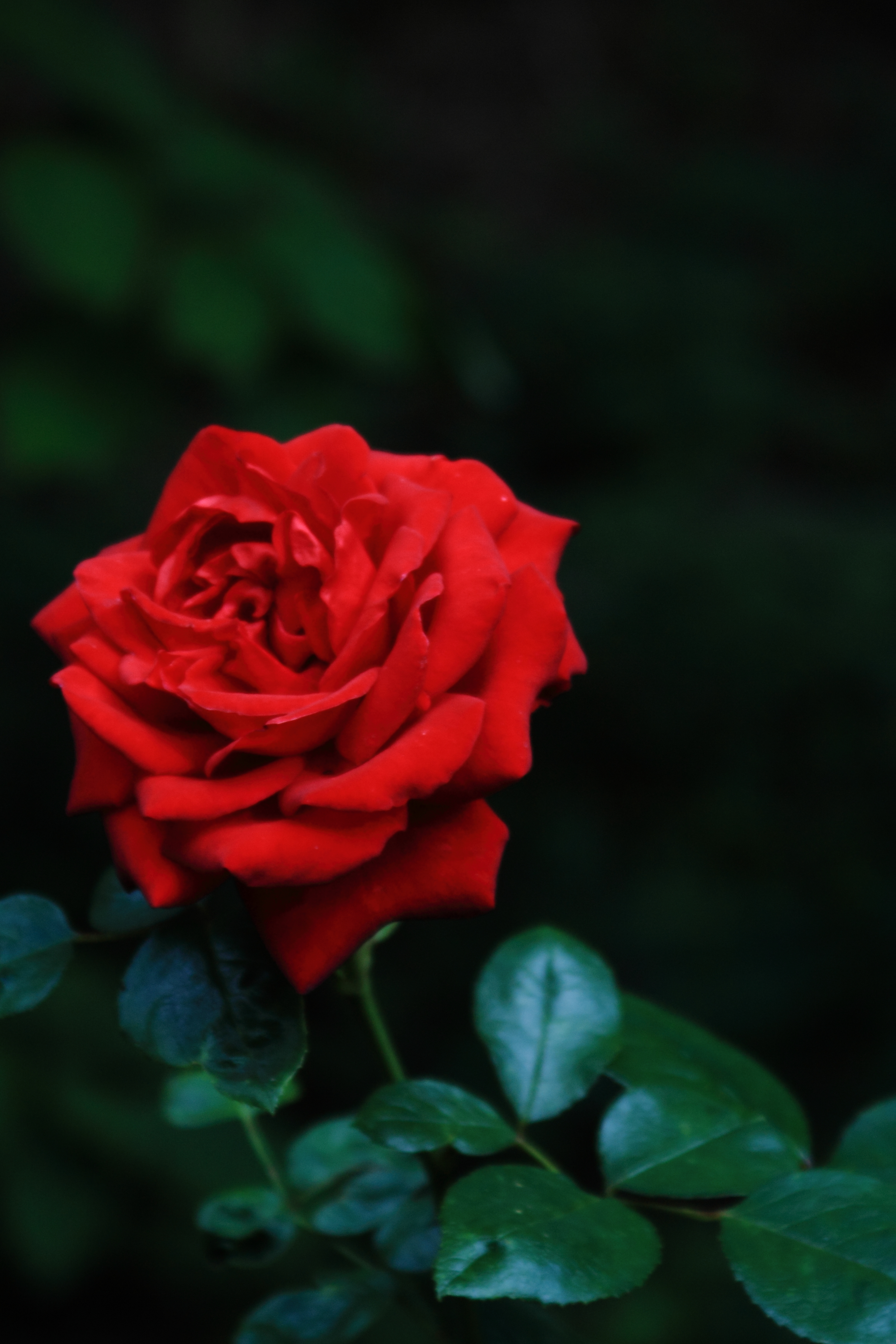
Ingrid Bergman rose

Woody Guthrie composed "Ingrid Bergman", a song about Bergman in 1950. The lyrics have been described as "erotic", and make reference to Bergman's relationship with Roberto Rossellini, which began during work on the film Stromboli. Billy Bragg and Wilco covered the song on their album Mermaid Avenue (1998).

Alfred Hitchcock based his film Rear Window (1954) (starring James Stewart as a Life wartime photographer) on Bergman and Capa's romance.

In 1984, a hybrid tea rose breed was named "Ingrid Bergman", in honor of the star.

Her portrayal of Ilsa Lund from Casablanca was parodied by Kate McKinnon in one episode of Saturday Night Live. In the opening montage of the 72nd Academy Awards, Billy Crystal, as Victor Laszlo, made a parody out of Casablanca's final scene. In the '80s, Warner Bros made Carrotblanca as a homage to Bogart and Bergman's character in Casablanca. In When Harry Met Sally (1989), Casablanca is a recurring theme, with the lead characters arguing over the meaning of its ending throughout the film. Bogart and Bergman also appeared in Tesco's Clubcard advertisement (2019).

To help educate and inform about the importance of mask-wearing during the COVID-19 pandemic, WarnerMedia, the Ad Council, and the Centers for Disease Control and Prevention (CDC), released a video featuring Bogart and Bergman in a scene from Casablanca wearing masks.

In one scene from Dead Men Don't Wear Plaid (1982), with some creative editing, Steve Martin's character is having a conversation with Alicia Huberman from Notorious. In one scene from the movie Lake House (2006), Sandra Bullock's character is seen to be watching the kiss scene from Notorious. The kiss scene between Bergman and Spencer Tracy from Dr Jekyll and Mr Hyde is featured in the Cinema Paradiso (1988) closing montage. Bergman's Sister Benedict is referenced in The Godfather (1972). There is one episode in the second season of The Days and Nights of Molly Dodd, which is titled Here's a Little Known Ingrid Bergman Incident.

Bergman's Ilsa also inspired the character Ilsa Faust, played by Swedish actress Rebecca Ferguson, in the Mission: Impossible film series. Ferguson was told by costar Tom Cruise and director Christopher McQuarrie to review Notorious and other of Bergman's films as preparation for her role.

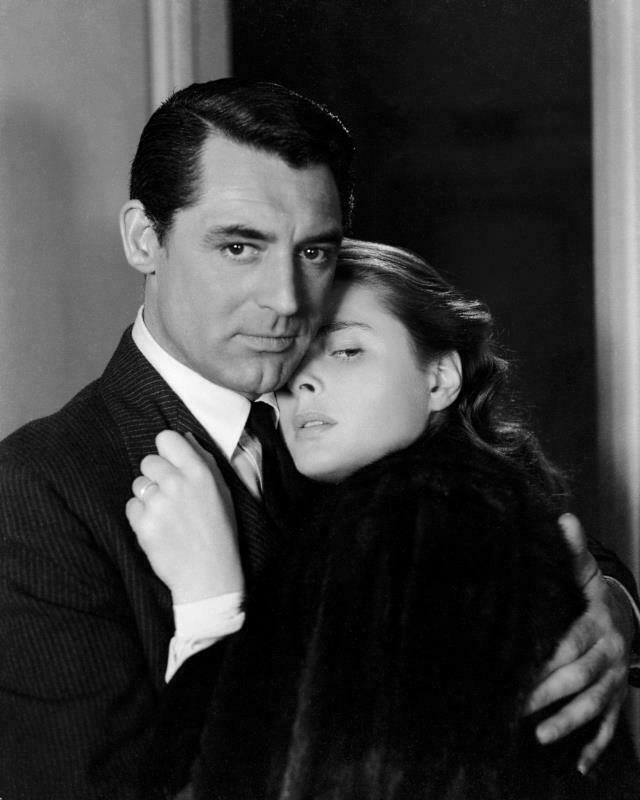
Cary Grant and Bergman in Notorious (1946)

In the movie La La Land (2016), the lead female character has a poster of Bergman on her bedroom wall. Near the end of the movie, another poster of Bergman can be seen by the side of a road. One of the original soundtracks for the film is named 'Bogart and Bergman.'

Bergman's publicity photo from Notorious was used as the front cover of the book by Dan Callahan, The Camera Lies: Acting for Hitchcock (2020). Bergman's love affair with Robert Capa has been dramatised in a 2012 novel by Chris Greenhalgh, Seducing Ingrid Bergman. Bergman is also referenced in Donald Trump's 2004 book How to Get Rich, and in Small Fry, a memoir by Lisa Brennan-Jobs, the daughter of Steve Jobs.

As part of its dedication to the female icons of Italian cinema, Bergman was immortalised in a mural on a public staircase off Via Fiamignano near Rome. A mural of her image from Casablanca was painted on the outdoor cinema wall in Fremont, Seattle. The Dutch National Airline named one of their planes "Ingrid Bergman" in the 2010s. There is a wax figure of her displayed at Madame Tussaud's, Hollywood, California. In Fjällbacka, off the coast of Sweden, a square was named as Ingrid Bergman's Square to honor her memory. A wooden mould of Bergman's feet is on display at Salvatore Ferragamo Museum in Florence, Italy.

== Awards and nominations ==
Ingrid Bergman became the second actress to win three Academy Awards for acting: two for Best Actress, and one for Best Supporting Actress. She is tied for second place in Oscars won with Walter Brennan (all three for Best Supporting Actor), Jack Nicholson (two for Best Actor and one for Best Supporting Actor), Meryl Streep (two for Best Actress and one for Best Supporting Actress), Frances McDormand (all three for Best Actress), Daniel Day-Lewis (all three for Best Actor), and Sean Penn (two for Best Actor and one for Best Supporting Actor). Katharine Hepburn holds the record, with four (all for Best Actress).

In 1960, Bergman became the second actress to complete the American Triple Crown of Acting status, after winning an Emmy Award.

== See also ==
- List of actors with two or more Academy Awards in acting categories
- List of Academy Award records – first Nordic to win for acting, in Gaslight (1944)
- List of actors nominated for Academy Awards for non-English performances – nominated for Best Actress, in Autumn Sonata (1978)
- List of Nordic Academy Award winners and nominees
- Primetime Emmy Award for Outstanding Lead Actress in a Limited or Anthology Series or Movie
