= List of Ingrid Bergman performances =

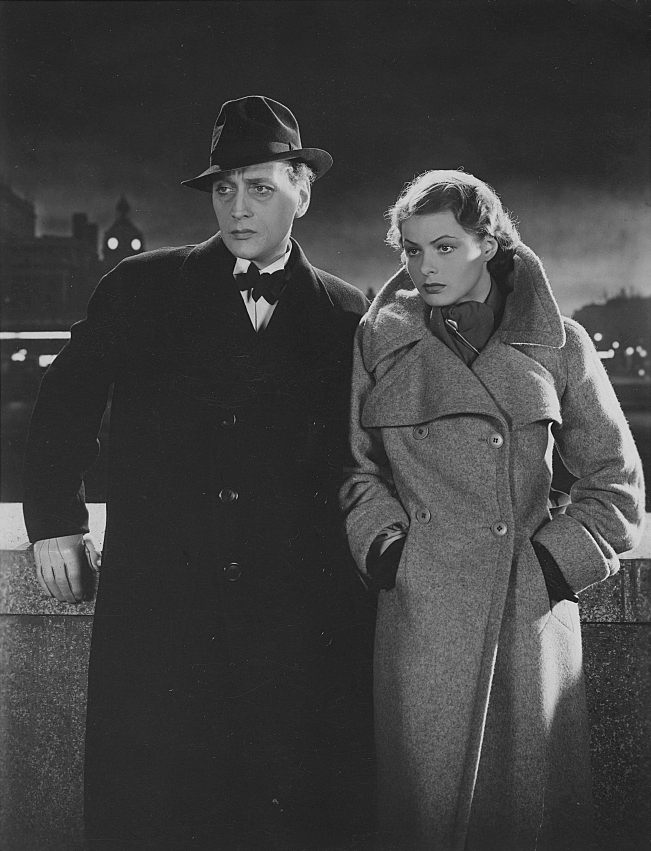
Gösta Ekman and Ingrid Bergman in Intermezzo (1936), the film that launched her international career

Ingrid Bergman (29 August 1915 – 29 August 1982) was a multilingual, Academy Award-winning actress born in Stockholm, conversant in Swedish, German, English, Italian, and French. She had been preparing for an acting career all her life. After her mother Frieda died when she was three years old, she was raised by her father Justus Samuel Bergman, a professional photographer who encouraged her to pose and act in front of the camera. As a young woman, she was shy, taller than the average women of her generation, and somewhat overweight. Acting allowed her to transcend these constraints, enabling her to transform herself into a character. She first appeared as an uncredited extra in the film Landskamp (1932), and was accepted into the Royal Dramatic Theatre of Stockholm as a scholarship student in 1933.

She appeared in a dozen films in Sweden, before being offered work in the American film industry. The movie that both she and historians cite as launching her international career was Intermezzo (1936), in which she shared the lead opposite Gösta Ekman. It brought her to the attention of producer David O. Selznick, who purchased the rights to the story and cast her as the female lead in the American version, Intermezzo: A Love Story (1939), with British actor Leslie Howard taking over the male lead. Bergman signed a three-picture contract with the German production company UFA GmbH, intending to launch her career in German films. In the end, she only acted in the comedy The Four Companions (Die vier Gesellen) (1938), directed by Carl Froelich. At the time of filming, she was pregnant with daughter Pia Lindström by her first husband, physician Petter Lindström, and performed with her abdomen bound. Following her daughter's birth, she made the Swedish film June Night (1940), and three American films: Adam Had Four Sons (1941), Rage in Heaven (1941), and Dr. Jekyll and Mr. Hyde (1942).

Bergman made over 40 films in her career, many of them for American producers and directors. In the early stages of making the World War II romantic drama Casablanca (1942), she and her co-stars Humphrey Bogart and Paul Henreid thought it would be an insignificant film, and all three wanted out of their commitments to the production. (Note: "Bogart and Paul [Henreid] and especially me believed that Casablanca was a little picture, a waste of our time." p. 10. ... "[Bergman] didn't want to be Ilsa in Casablanca. She wanted to be Maria in For Whom The Bell Tolls. And Humphrey didn't really want to be Rick. Ingrid remembered that the only subject they had in common, was how much they both wanted to get out of Casablanca" p. 82 ... "[Henreid] had declined the part of Lazlo, because he felt it wouldn't be a good one for his future career in Hollywood." p. 85) The script was a work in progress, with director Michael Curtiz in frequent conflict with the writers and with producer Hal B. Wallis. The actors and Curtiz were crafting the characters and story line as they went along. After its release, the film struck a chord with wartime audiences. It was nominated for eight Academy Awards, winning in the categories of Best Picture, Best Director, and Best Screenplay. For decades afterwards, there were special screenings and retrospectives of the film, often with Bergman as a guest speaker. She had attended so many events for the film, being asked the same questions over and over, that she once remarked, "When I die, I hope they won't show it again".

Alfred Hitchcock directed her in three films: Spellbound (1945), Notorious (1946), and Under Capricorn (1949). Impressed by Italian director Roberto Rossellini's films Rome, Open City (1945) and Paisà (1946), she wrote to him offering her services as an actress. Together, they would make Stromboli (1950), Europa 51 (1951), Siamo donne (1953), Journey to Italy (1954), and Joan of Arc at the Stake (1954). Her off-screen relationship with Rossellini ended her marriage to Lindström, and produced out-of-wedlock son Renato Roberto Ranaldo Giusto Giuseppe ("Robin") Rossellini. She and Lindström divorced in 1950, and she married Rossellini. After the 1952 births of their twin daughters Isotta Ingrid and Isabella, she and Rossellini divorced in 1957. Hitchcock had remained her life-long friend, and told her, "He ruined your career".

Bergman married for a final time in 1958, to Swedish film producer Lars Schmidt. He produced her works of 24 Hours in a Woman's Life (1960-TV), The Human Voice (1960-TV), and Hedda Gabler (1962-Stage play; 1963-TV). They divorced in 1975.

Someone, I don't remember who, a woman, told me, "You can't have it all", especially a woman can't have it all. Well, I did. I had it all, even if I did muddle some of it. Sometimes I hurt myself. That's the way life is. I took the risks. Happiness is good health and a bad memory.

— Ingrid Bergman,

Ingrid Bergman was the recipient of numerous global nominations and awards for her work, including three Academy Awards. In the category of Best Actress, she won for Gaslight (1944) and Anastasia (1956). For Murder on the Orient Express (1974), she was named Best Supporting Actress. She appeared multiple times on the American stage. In the pre-television era, she was a prolific guest on radio programs. Bergman received a star on the Hollywood Walk of Fame on 8 February 1960.

A Woman Called Golda on American television earned her the 1982 Primetime Emmy Award for Outstanding Lead Actress in a Miniseries or a Movie. When asked to play Israeli Prime Minister Golda Meir, Bergman doubted that the audience would accept her – a tall Swedish Protestant – in the part, but producer Gene Corman and director Alan Gibson believed that on screen, she generated the same feeling of public trust as did Meir. She was in the last stages of her battle with breast cancer when shooting commenced, making her un-insurable for the production, but all concerned believed the project was worth the risk. The film premiered on American television on 26 April 1982. Four months later, Bergman died on her birthday. Her daughter Pia accepted the Emmy award on her behalf.

== Films ==
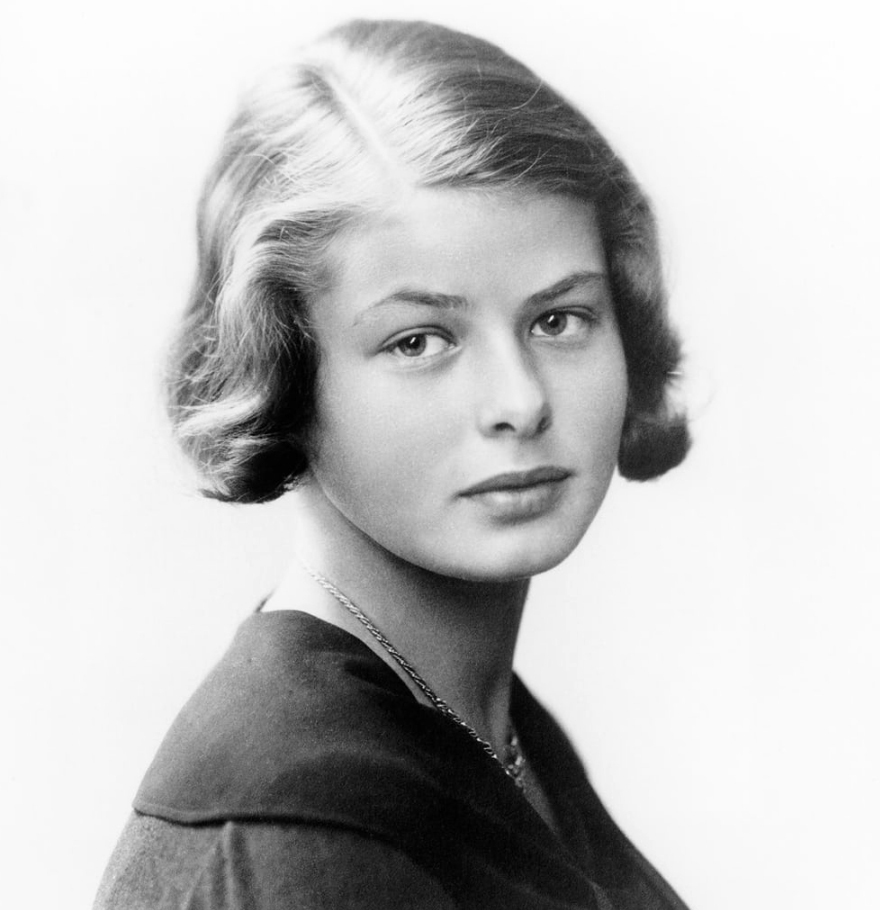
Ingrid Bergman at age 14

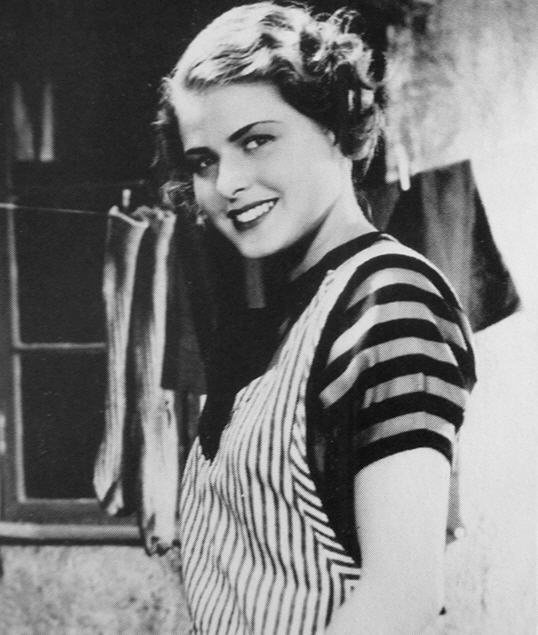
Ingrid Bergman in The Count of Monk's Bridge (1934)

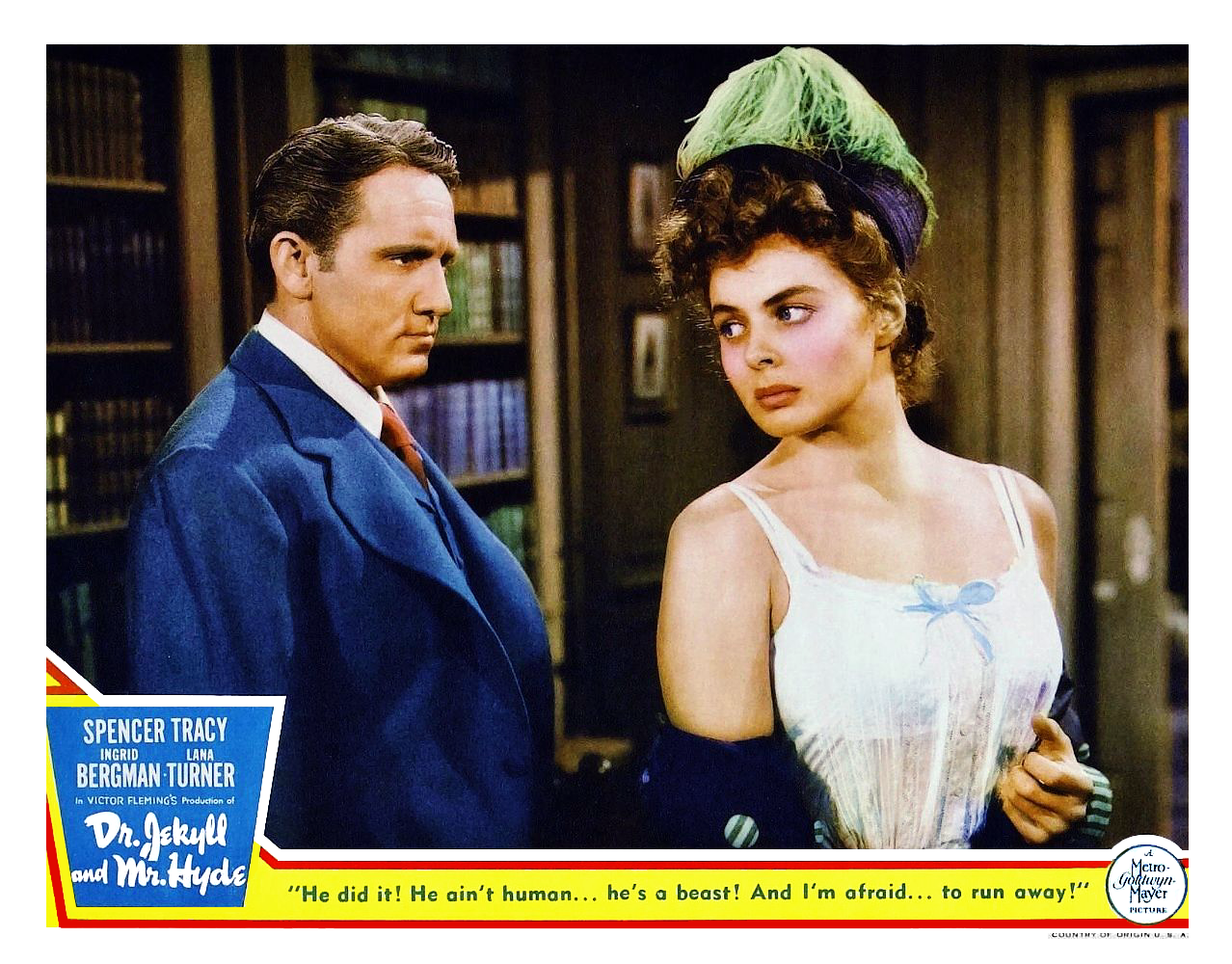
Lobby poster, Spencer Tracy and Ingrid Bergman in Dr. Jekyll and Mr. Hyde (1941)

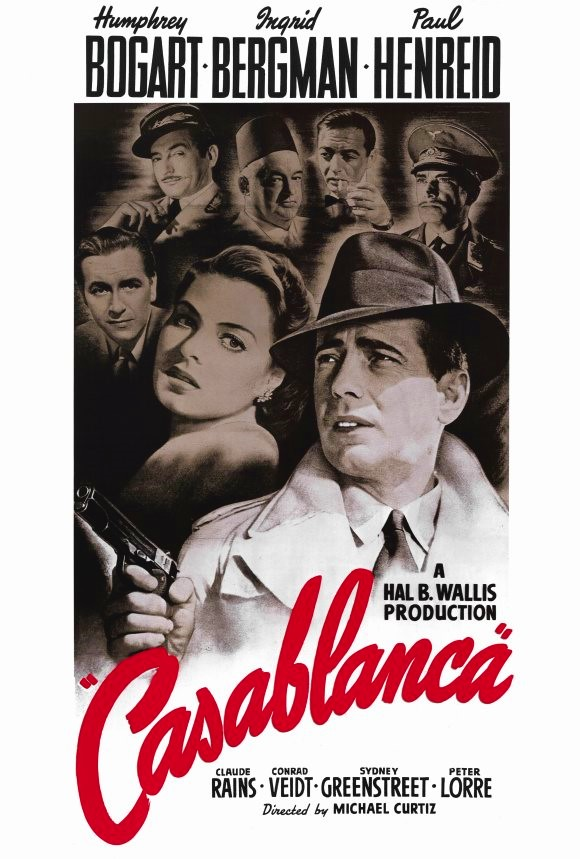
Lobby poster for Casablanca, (1942)

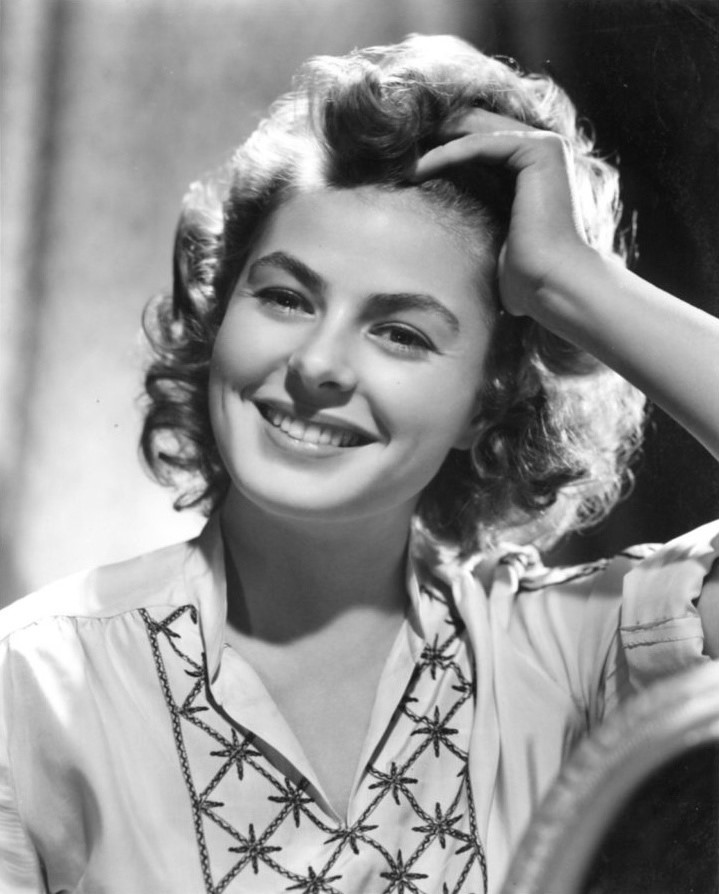
Ingrid Bergman in Gaslight (1944)

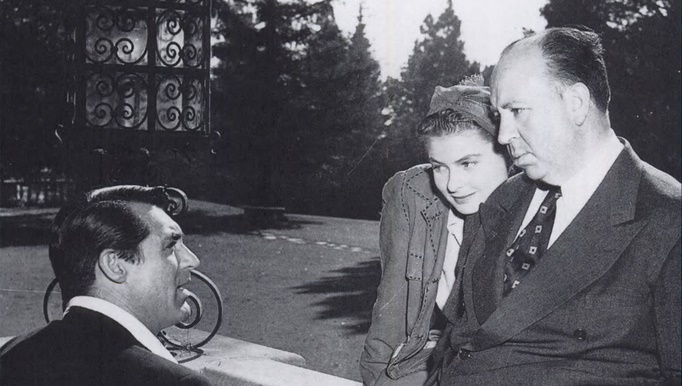
Cary Grant, Bergman, and Alfred Hitchcock filming Notorious (1946)

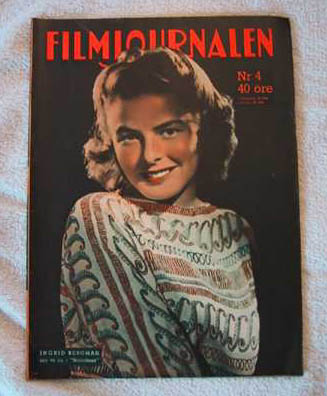
Bergman on the cover of Swedish magazine Filmjournalen (1947)

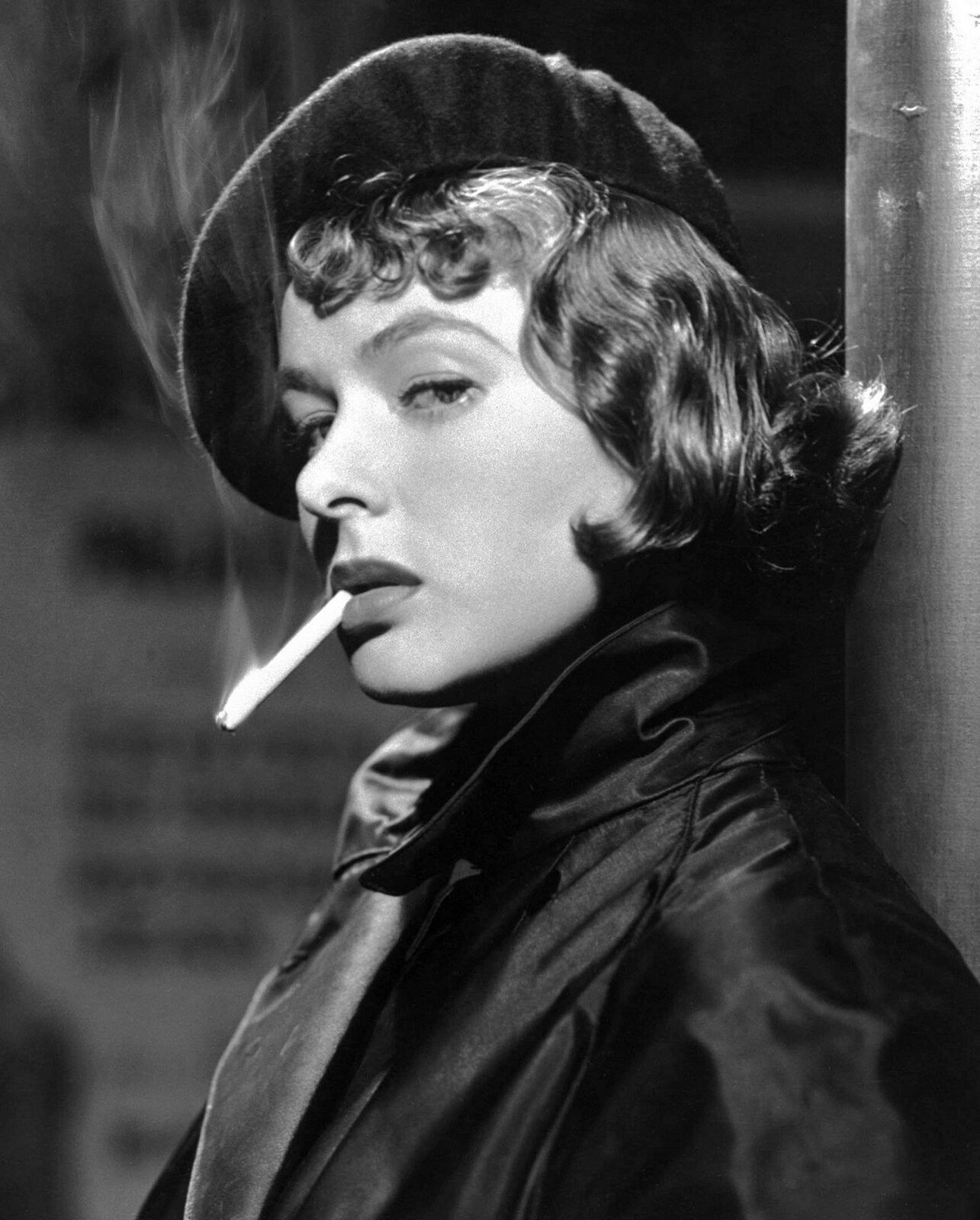
Ingrid Bergman in Arch of Triumph (1948)

Feature length film credits of Ingrid Bergman
Title	Year	Role	Notes	Ref(s)
International Match	1932	Girl waiting in line	Uncredited	
Tagning "På solsidan"	1935		Film short	
The Count of the Old Town	1935	Elsa Edlund; Swedish title: Munkbrogreven	AB Svensk Filmindustri	
Swedenhielms	1935	Astrid, Bo Swedenhielms fästmö	AB Svensk Filmindustri	
Ocean Breakers	1935	Karin Ingman	Bränningar	
Walpurgis Night	1935	Lena Bergström	Valborgsmässoafton	
On the Sunny Side	1936	Eva Bergh, bankkassörska	AB Wivefilm; På solsidan	
Intermezzo	1936	Anita Hoffman	AB Svensk Filmindustri	
Dollar	1938	Julia Balzar, skådespelerska	AB Svensk Filmindustri	
The Four Companions	1938	Marianne Kruge	Die Vier Gesellen	
A Woman's Face	1938	Anna Holm, aka Anna Paulsson	En kvinnas ansikte AB Svensk Filmindustri	
Only One Night	1939	Eva Beckman	En enda natt	
Intermezzo: A Love Story	1939	Anita Hoffman	Selznick International Pictures	
June Night	1940	Kerstin Norbäc aka Sara Nordanå	Juninatten; AB Svensk Filmindustri	
Adam Had Four Sons	1941	Emilie Gallatin	Columbia Pictures	
Rage in Heaven	1941	Stella Bergen	Metro-Goldwyn-Mayer (MGM)	
Dr. Jekyll and Mr. Hyde	1941	Ivy Peterson	MGM	
Casablanca	1942	Ilsa Lund	Warner Bros.	
For Whom the Bell Tolls	1943	María	Paramount Pictures; Nomination - Academy Award for Best Actress; Preserved at the UCLA Film & Television Archive	
Swedes in America	1943	Herself (short subject)	United Films	
Gaslight	1944	Paula Alquist Anton	MGM; Academy Award for Best Actress; Golden Globe Award for Best Actress in a Motion Picture – Drama	
Spellbound	1945	Dr. Constance Petersen	Selznick International Pictures; New York Film Critics Circle Award for Best Actress; Preserved at the UCLA Film & Television Archive	
Saratoga Trunk	1945	Clio Dulaine	Warner Bros.	
The Bells of St. Mary's	1945	Sister Mary Benedict	RKO Pictures Nomination - Academy Award for Best Actress; New York Film Critics Circle Award for Best Actress; Golden Globe Award for Best Actress in a Motion Picture – Drama	
The American Creed	1946	Herself	National Conference for Community and Justice	
Notorious	1946	Alicia Huberman	RKO Pictures	
Arch of Triumph	1948	Joan Madou	Enterprise Productions, Inc.	
Joan of Arc	1948	Joan [D'Arc]	Sierra Pictures; Preserved at the UCLA Film & Television Archive; Nomination - Academy Award for Best Actress	
Under Capricorn	1949	Lady Henrietta Flusky	Warner Bros.	
Stromboli	1950	Karin Bjiorsen	RKO Pictures	
Europa 51	1952	Irene Girard	Volpi Cup for Best Actress aka "Greatest Love"; Roberto Rossellini Productions	
We, the Women aka Siamo donne	1953	Herself	(segment: "Ingrid Bergman"); Alfredo Guarini Productions	
Journey to Italy	1954	Katherine Joyce	Viaggio in Italia; Roberto Rossellini Productions	
Fear	1954	Irene Wagner	Minerva-Ariston-Aniene	
Joan of Arc at the Stake	1954	Giovanna d'Arco (Joan of Arc)	Roberto Rossellini Productions	
Elena and Her Men	1956	Elena et les hommes Princess Elena Sokorowska	Franco London Films SA; Les Films Gibé; Electra Compania Cinematographia	
Anastasia	1956	Anna Koreff / Anastasia	Academy Award for Best Actress; Golden Globe Award for Best Actress in a Motion Picture – Drama; 20th Century Fox	
Indiscreet	1958	Anna Kalman	Warner Bros. Nomination - Golden Globe Award for Best Actress – Motion Picture Comedy or Musical	
The Inn of the Sixth Happiness	1958	Gladys Aylward	Nomination - Golden Globe Award for Best Actress in a Motion Picture – Drama BAFTA Award for Best Actress in a Leading Role; National Board of Review Award for Best Actress; 20th Century Fox	
Goodbye Again	1961	Paula Tessier	United Artists	
Auguste / Kolka, My Friend	1961	Cameo	Les Films Marceau	
The Visit	1964	Karla Zachanassian	20th Century Fox	
The Yellow Rolls-Royce	1964	Gerda Millett	MGM	
Stimulantia	1967	Mathilde Hartman (Segment: "The Necklace")	Omnia Films	
Cactus Flower	1969	Stephanie Dickinson	Columbia Pictures; Nomination - Golden Globe Award for Best Actress – Motion Picture Comedy or Musical	
Henri Langlois	1970	Herself (documentary)	Hershon Films	
A Walk in the Spring Rain	1970	Libby Meredith	Columbia Pictures	
From the Mixed-Up Files of Mrs. Basil E. Frankweiler	1973	Mrs. Frankweiler	Westfall Productions	
Murder on the Orient Express	1974	Greta Ohlsson	Academy Award for Best Supporting Actress; BAFTA Award for Best Supporting Actress; G. W. Films Ltd.	
A Matter of Time	1976	Countess Lucretia Sanziani	American International Pictures	
Autumn Sonata	1978	Charlotte Andergast	New World Pictures; Nomination - Academy Award for Best Actress; Nomination - Golden Globe Award for Best Actress in a Motion Picture – Drama; Nomination - National Board of Review Award for Best Actress; National Society of Film Critics Award for Best Actress	

=== Box Office Ranking ===
- 1944 - 24th (US)
- 1945 - 13th (US)
- 1946 - 2nd (US), 7th (UK)
- 1947 - 3rd (US), 9th (UK)
- 1948 - 10th (US)
- 1957 - 24th (US)
- 1958 - 17th (US)
- 1959 - 23rd (US)

== Television ==
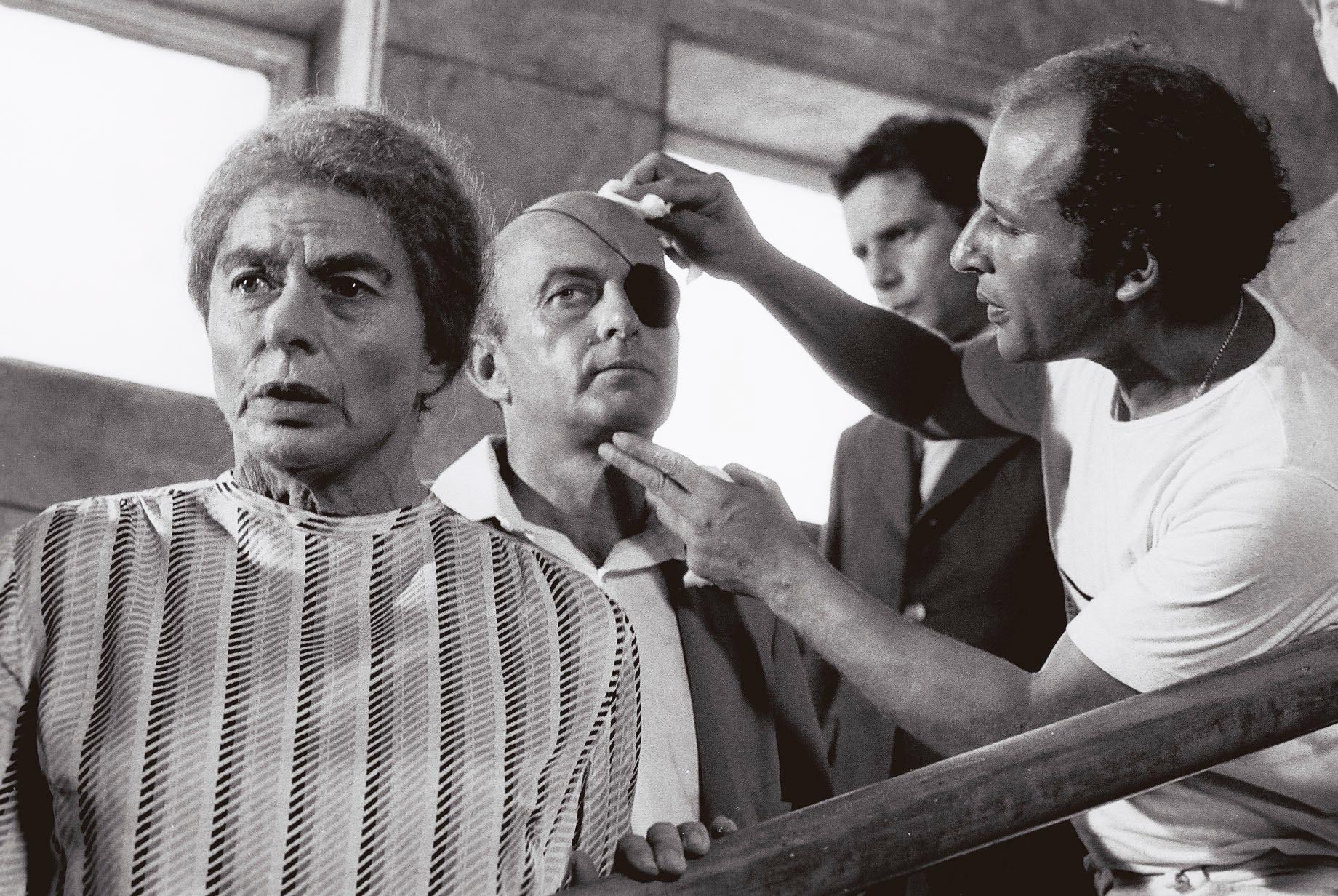
Ingrid Bergman and actor Yossi Graber in A Woman Called Golda (1982)

Television credits of Ingrid Bergman
Title	Year	Role	Notes	Ref(s)
The Turn of the Screw	1959	Governess	Emmy Award; NBC-TV	
24 Hours in a Woman's Life	1960	Clare Lester	CBS-TV	
Hedda Gabler	1963	Hedda Gabler	CBS-TV	
The Human Voice	1967	A Woman	ABC-TV	
American Film Institute Salute to Alfred Hitchcock	1979	Herself	CBS-TV	
A Woman Called Golda	1982	Golda Meir	Emmy Award; Paramount Television	

== Theatre ==
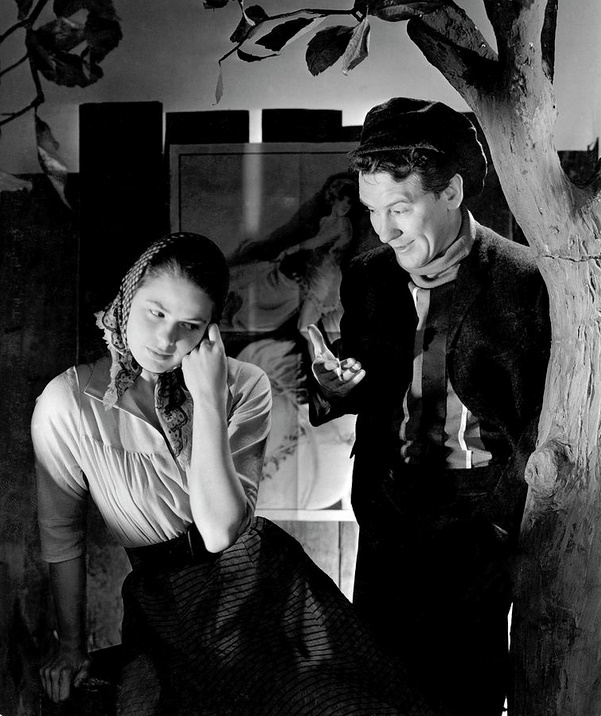
Ingrid Bergman and Burgess Meredith in Liliom (1940)

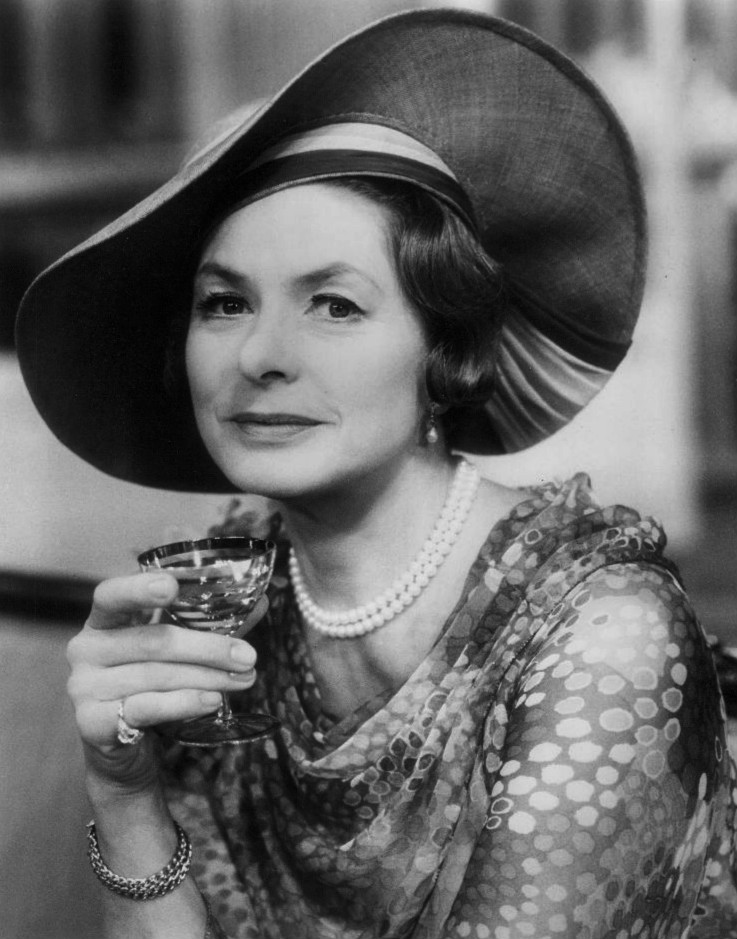
Ingrid Bergman in The Constant Wife (1975)

Theatre credits of Ingrid Bergman
Title	Year	Role	Theatre/Notes	Ref(s)
Liliom	1940	Julie	44th Street Theatre; New York City, New York	
Anna Christie	1941	Anna Christie	Lobero Theatre; San Diego, California	
Joan of Lorraine	1946	Joan of Arc / Mary Grey	Alvin Theater; New York City. NY	
Joan of Arc at the Stake	1953	Joan of Arc	San Carlo Opera House; Naples, Italy	
Joan of Arc at the Stake	1954	Joan of Arc	Stoll Theatre; London, United Kingdom	
Tea and Sympathy	1956	Laura Reynolds	Théâtre de Paris; Paris, France	
Hedda Gabler	1962	Hedda Gabler	Théâtre Montparnasse Gaston Baty; Paris, France	
A Month in the Country	1965	Natalia Petrovna	Yvonne Arnaud Theatre; Guildford, United Kingdom; Cambridge Theatre; London, United Kingdom	
More Stately Mansions	1967	Deborah Harford	Broadhurst Theatre; New York City; Ahmanson Theatre; Los Angeles	
Captain Brassbound's Conversion	1971	Lady Cecily Waynflete	Cambridge Theatre; London, United Kingdom	
Captain Brassbound's Conversion	1972	Lady Cecily Waynflete	Opera House, Kennedy Center; Washington, D.C.	
The Constant Wife	1973–1975	Constance Middleton	Albery Theatre; London, United Kingdom; Shubert Theatre; New York, NY	
Waters of the Moon	1977–1978	Helen Lancaster	Festival Theatre; Chichester, United Kingdom; Haymarket Theatre; London, United Kingdom	

== Radio ==
Radio credits of Ingrid Bergman
Show	Air date	Episode	Role	Co-stars	Ref(s)
Lux Radio Theatre	29 January 1940	"Intermezzo"	Anita Hoffman	Herbert Marshall; Gail Patrick	
Lux Radio Theatre	1 December 1941	"A Man's Castle"	Trina	Spencer Tracy	MP3
The Kate Smith Variety Show	16 January 1942	"Patterns"		Orson Welles, Olivia de Havilland, Lou Holtz	
Readers and Writers	24 March 1942		Herself	Edwin Seaver	
Cavalcade of America	30 March 1942	"The Silent Heart"	Jenny Lind	Karl Swenson, Bill Johnstone	
CBS Looks At Hollywood	1942		Herself	Hedda Hopper, Gary Cooper	
The Screen Guild Theater	26 April 1943	"Casablanca"	Ilsa Lund	Humphrey Bogart, Paul Henreid	MP3
Mail Call	15 September 1943	#56		Kay Thompson, Cass Daley, Edgar Bergen	
Star Program with Lorne Greene	October 1943	Herself		Lorne Greene, Walter Huston, Joan Fontaine	
March of Dimes		"1944 March of Dimes Campaign"	Herself	Basil O'Connor, John B. Kennedy	
Mayerling	2 April 1944	"Star and the Story"	Marie Vetsera	Walter Pidgeon	
Everything for the Boys	25 April 1944	"Death Takes A Holiday"	Grazia	Ronald Colman	MP3
Silver Theater	21 May 1944	"The Guardsman"	The Actor's Wife	Herbert Marshall, Nigel Bruce	
Rudy Vallee Show	9 September 1944	Premiere Show	Herself	Edith Gwynn, Fritz Feld, Lou Lubin	
The Screen Guild Theater	30 October 1944	"Anna Karenina"	Anna Karenina	Gregory Peck	MP3
The Kate Smith Variety Show	12 November 1944			Milton Berle	
Mail Call	31 January 1945	#130	Guest	Edgar Bergen, Marion Hutton	MP3
Lux Radio Theatre	12 February 1945	"For Whom The Bell Tolls"'	Maria	Gary Cooper, Akim Tamiroff	MP3
17th Academy Awards Ceremony	15 March 1945		Recipient – Best Actress	Bob Hope, John Cromwell, Jennifer Jones, et al.	MP3
Command Performance	29 March 1945	#168	Guest	Bob Hope, Charles Boyer, et al.	MP3
Arch Oboler's Plays	5 April 1945	"Strange Morning"	Miss Stewart		MP3
Our Hour of National Sorrow	15 April 1945	A Tribute to President Roosevelt	Poem Reader	Multiple celebrities	MP3
Seventh War Loan Drive Show	13 May 1945	(replay of 5 April + Morgenthau speech)	Miss Stewart	Henry Morgenthau	RA
Lux Radio Theatre	4 June 1945	"Intermezzo"	Anita Hoffman	Joseph Cotten, Paula Winslowe	MP3
The Fred Waring Show	14 August 1945	Guest	Self	Fred Waring, Jack Benny, Larry Adler	
Jack Benny Show	14 October 1945	"Gaslight"	Guest	Jack Benny, Larry Adler	MP3
Newspaper Guild Page-One Awards	6 December 1945		Herself	Norman Corwin, Duke Ellington, Irving Berlin	
The Radio Hall of Fame	20 January 1946	"Presentation of Film Critics Awards"	Recipient – Best Actress	Ray Milland	MP3
Bob Hope Show	5 February 1946	"Look Achievement Awards"	Herself	Bob Hope, Frances Langford	
18th Academy Awards Ceremony (#217)	14 April 1946	Command Performance	Presenter – Best Actor	Bob Hope, Frank Sinatra, George Murphy, Ray Milland, et al.	
Lux Radio Theater	29 April 1946	"Gaslight"	Paula Alquist Anton	Charles Boyer, Gale Gordon	
United Jewish Appeal	16 May 1946	"The Star Spangled Way "	Herself	Jack Benny, Ginger Rogers, Tallulah Bankhead	
The Screen Guild Theater	26 August 1946	"Bells of St. Mary's"	Sister Mary Benedict	Bing Crosby	MP3
Centennial Anniversary of Ellen Terry	27 February 1947	"Born in a Merry Hour"'	Herself	Helen Hayes, Margaret Webster, Eva Le Gallienne, John Gielgud	
Theater Guild on the Air	6 April 1947	"Still Life"	Laura Jesson	Sam Wanamaker, Peggy Wood	MP3
The Screen Guild Theater	6 October 1947	"Bells of St. Mary's"	Sister Mary Benedict	Bing Crosby	MP3
U.S.O. Campaign	1947		Herself	Douglas Fairbanks Jr., George Murphy	
Building For Peace	1947	"Flood Tide"			
Words with Music	1947	#29	Poetry Reader		
Lux Radio Theater	26 January 1948	"Notorious"	Alicia Huberman	Joseph Cotten	MP3
Theater Guild on the Air	18 April 1948	"Anna Karenina"	Anna Karenina		
Red Cross Flood Relief Show	13 June 1948		Herself	Chester Lauck, Andy Russell	
Lux Radio Theater	14 June 1948	"Jane Eyre"	Jane Eyre	Robert Montgomery, Bill Johnstone	MP3
Ford Theater	12 November 1948	"Camille"	Marguerite Gautier		
Lux Radio Theater	13 December 1948	"The Seventh Veil"	Francesca Cunningham	Robert Montgomery, Bill Johnstone	MP3
The Screen Guild Theater	6 January 1949	"Notorious"	Alicia Huberman	John Hodiak, J. Carrol Naish	MP3
Ford Theater	21 January 1949	"Anna Christie"	Anna Christopherson	Broderick Crawford, John Qualen	MP3
Great Scenes from Great Plays	18 February 1949	"A Doll's House"	Nora Helmer	Brian Aherne	MP3
Star Spots	1949	"Whole Blood Ready" (1 of 3 mini-dramas)		Fred MacMurray, Joan Leslie	
Stage-Struck (CBS Radio)	10 January 1954	"Why Young Actors Try To Break Into The Theatre"	Herself	Mike Wallace, Arthur Schwartz, Dorothy Fields, Renee Jeanmaire	
Stage-Struck (CBS Radio)	2 May 1954	Season Finale	Herself	All seasonal guest stars	

== Audio recordings ==
Audio books read by Ingrid Bergman
Title	Year	Notes	Ref(s)
The Pied Piper of Hamelin	1946	2 10" 78 RPM Records	
The Human Voice	1960	12" Microgroove LP 33⅓ RPM Record	
The Inn of the Sixth Happiness	1979	Abridged Audiobook, 2 Cassettes	

== See also ==
- List of awards and nominations received by Ingrid Bergman

== Bibliography ==
- Chandler, Charlotte (2007). Ingrid : Ingrid Bergman, a personal biography. New York: Simon & Schuster. ISBN 978-0-7432-9421-8.
- Leamer, Laurence (1986). As Time Goes By : the Life of Ingrid Bergman. New York : Harper & Row. ISBN 978-0-06-015485-1.
- Lunde, Arne (2010). Nordic Exposures: Scandinavian Identities in Classical Hollywood Cinema. Seattle: University of Washington Press. ISBN 978-0-295-99045-3.
- Quirk, Lawrence J. (1989). The Complete Films of Ingrid Bergman. Citadel Press. ISBN 978-0-8065-0972-3.
- Thomson, David (2010). Ingrid Bergman. Faber and Faber, Inc. ISBN 978-0-86547-934-0.
