= Elettra Rossellini Wiedemann =

American food editor, writer, fashion model, and socialite

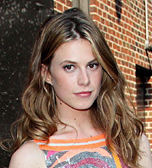
- Wiedemann in 2008
- Born: Elettra-Ingrid Wiedemann; July 26, 1983 (age 43); New York City, U.S.
- Education: The New School; London School of Economics
- Spouses: James Marshall (m. 2012; div. 2015) Caleb Lane (m. 2023)
- Children: 2
- Parents: Isabella Rossellini; Jonathan Wiedemann
- Relatives: Ingrid Bergman (maternal grandmother); Roberto Rossellini (maternal grandfather); Isotta Ingrid Rossellini (maternal aunt)
- Modeling information
- Height: 5 ft 11 in (1.80 m)
- Hair color: Brown
- Eye color: Brown

Elettra-Ingrid Rossellini Wiedemann (born July 26, 1983) is an American food editor, writer, fashion model, and socialite. She is the daughter of Italian actress and model Isabella Rossellini and Jonathan Wiedemann, an American. Her maternal grandparents were Swedish actress Ingrid Bergman and Italian film director Roberto Rossellini.

== Early life ==
Wiedemann was born and raised in New York City. She has three half siblings from her father's second marriage. She also has a brother on her mother's side. She attended high school at the United Nations International School, where she became fluent in French. Growing up, Wiedemann suffered from scoliosis, a spinal condition that had also afflicted her mother, and had to wear a back brace 23 hours a day from the ages of 12 to 17.

She attended college at The New School, graduating with a Bachelor of Arts in International Relations. She attended a two-year graduate school program at the London School of Economics in order to receive a master's degree in Biomedicine, Bioscience and Society.

== Career ==
Wiedemann worked as a fashion model and spokesperson for over 10 years before Impatient Foodie. She was discovered by Bruce Weber and quickly became one of the industry's most coveted models, shooting with photographers such as Karl Lagerfeld, Patrick Demarchelier, Annie Leibovitz, Arthur Elgort, Mario Testino, and Craig McDean for magazines such as American Vogue, French Vogue, Harpers Bazaar, Another, GQ, the French and Italian editions of Elle, to name a few. She has also been a spokesmodel for Lancôme since 2004 and done ads for Lancôme makeup, fragrance, and skin care worldwide.

While she was modeling, Wiedemann attended graduate school at the London School of Economics, ultimately receiving her Masters of Science (MSc) in Biomedicine, Biosciences and Society in 2010.

Upon graduation from the LSE, Wiedemann launched a pop-up restaurant, GOODNESS. GOODNESS featured a different chef and different menu every day. GOODNESS popped up twice at NY Fashion Week and at Iceland's Design March Festival before turning into a show (Elettra's Goodness) on Vogue's new channel. Guests included Blake Lively, Seth Meyers, Grace Coddington, and Karlie Kloss.

She has also written for publications including Refinery29, VICE Munchies, Teen Vogue, SELF, Paper Magazine, The Cut, and Cherry Bombe.

== Personal life ==
Wiedemann was married to restaurateur James Marshall from 2012 to 2015. She has two sons with actor Caleb Lane.

She raced in several triathlons and three Half Ironman races. For her last race (Ironman 70.3 in Lake Stevens), she renounced energy gels and baked all of her own bite-sized food for racing fuel, and is convinced it helped her achieve her fastest 70.3 time.
