= List of awards and nominations received by Ingrid Bergman =

Ingrid Bergman awards and nominations
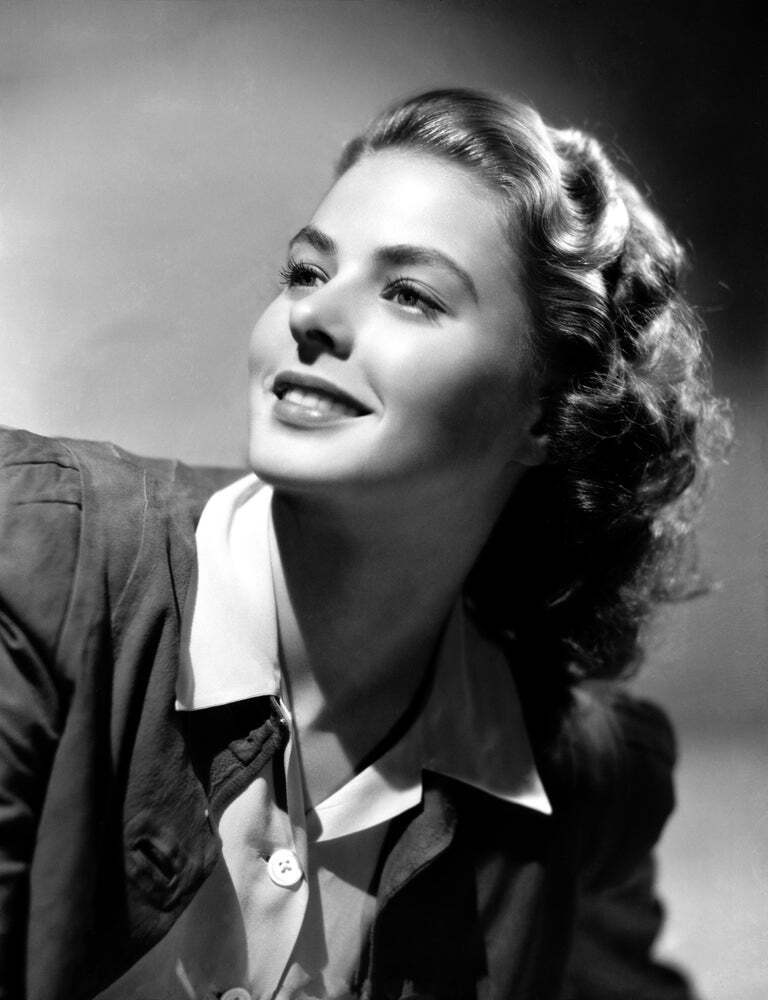
- Bergman in 1940
Awards and nominations
Award	Wins	Nominations
Academy Awards	3	7
BAFTA Awards	1	2
Emmy Awards	2	3
Golden Globes	4	8
Olivier Awards	0	1
Tony Awards	1	1

Totals (Note: Certain award groups do not simply award one winner. They acknowledge several different recipients, have runners-up, and have third place. Since this is a specific recognition and is different from losing an award, runner-up mentions are considered wins in this award tally. For simplification and to avoid errors, each award in this list has been presumed to have had a prior nomination.)
- Wins: 32
- Nominations: 47

Ingrid Bergman was a Swedish actress known for her extensive and dynamic roles on stage and screen. Over her career she received several awards including three Academy Awards, a British Academy Film Award, four Golden Globe Awards, two Primetime Emmy Award, a Tony Award and the Volpi Cup for Best Actress prize from the Venice International Film Festival as well as a nomination for a Laurence Olivier Award. She was honored with the Honorary César in 1976 and was inducted into the Hollywood Walk of Fame with a Motion Picture Star in 1960.

She has appeared in a number of critically acclaimed European and American films and television series. She subsequently received a number of awards, primarily during the 1940s and 1950s, though she did receive some recognition during the 1930s, 1960s, 1970s, and 1980s. She is best remembered for her roles as Ilsa Lund in Casablanca, and Alicia Huberman in Notorious, but despite the critical success of both films, she was a notable absence from the nominations they received in their subsequent awards seasons.

The first role for which she received major awards recognition was for her role as a young woman traumatized by the Spanish war in the epic war film For Whom the Bell Tolls (1943), for which she was nominated for the Academy Award for Best Actress. That same year she starred as the romantic love interest in the war drama Casablanca (1943). The following year she played a young woman manipulated by her husband in the George Cukor directed psychological thriller Gaslight (1944) for which she won the Golden Globe Award for Best Actress in a Motion Picture – Drama and the Academy Award for Best Actress. She then played a compassionate nun in the musical dramedy The Bells of St. Mary's (1945) for which she earned her a second consecutive Golden Globe Award for Best Actress in a Motion Picture – Drama as well as a nomination for the Academy Award for Best Actress. For her portrayals of the title role in the historical epic Joan of Arc (1948) and title role in the historical drama Anastasia (1956) she received further Oscar-nominations winning her second Academy Award for the later.

Outside of the United States, she also received recognition in the United Kingdom for her performance as Gladys Aylward in the British war film The Inn of the Sixth Happiness, for which she was nominated for the BAFTA for Best Foreign Actress, though she went on to lose to Simone Signoret for Room at the Top. In Italy, too, she came to prominence for her role in Europe '51, an Italian neorealist film, for which she won the Nastro d'Argento for Best Actress. In Germany, she received five Bambi Awards, whilst in France, she was awarded an honorary César in 1976. After winning two Academy Awards she won her third, this time in the category of Best Supporting Actress, for 1974's Murder on the Orient Express, based on the Agatha Christie novel of the same name, for which she also received her first and only BAFTA Award. Her Oscar nomination for the Ingmar Bergman tragedy movie Autumn Sonata (1978) was the first she had received for a film in her native language of Swedish.

On the Broadway stage, Bergman played the title role in the Maxwell Anderson play Joan of Lorraine (1947) for which she won the Tony Award for Best Actress in a Play. On the West End stage, she played Helen Lancaster in the N. C. Hunter play Waters of the Moon (1978). On television, she won two Primetime Emmy Awards for Outstanding Lead Actress in a Limited Series or Movie for her portrayals of The Governess in Startimes production of "The Turn of the Screw" (1960) and the Prime Minister of Israel Golda Meir in the television film A Woman Called Golda (1982).

Bergman won three Academy Awards for acting - two for Best Actress, and one for Best Supporting Actress. She remains tied for second place in terms of Oscars won, along with Walter Brennan (all for Best Supporting Actor), Jack Nicholson (two for Best Actor, and one for Best Supporting Actor), Meryl Streep (two for Best Actress, and one for Best Supporting Actress), Daniel Day-Lewis (all for Best Actor), and Frances McDormand (all for Best Actress). Katharine Hepburn still holds the record, with four (all for Best Actress).

== Major associations ==
=== Academy Awards ===
Year	Category	Nominated work	Result	Ref.
1943	Best Actress	For Whom the Bell Tolls	Nominated	
1944	Best Actress	Gaslight	Won	
1945	Best Actress	The Bells of St. Mary's	Nominated	
1948	Best Actress	Joan of Arc	Nominated	
1956	Best Actress	Anastasia	Won	
1974	Best Supporting Actress	Murder on the Orient Express	Won	
1978	Best Actress	Autumn Sonata	Nominated	

=== BAFTA Awards ===
Year	Category	Nominated work	Result	Ref.
British Academy Film Awards
1958	Best Actress in a Leading Role	The Inn of the Sixth Happiness	Nominated	
1974	Best Actress in a Supporting Role	Murder on the Orient Express	Won	

=== Emmy Awards ===
Year	Category	Nominated work	Result	Ref.
Primetime Emmy Awards
1960	Outstanding Actress in a Limited Series or Movie	The Turn of the Screw	Won	
1961	Outstanding Actress in a Limited Series or Movie	Twenty-Four Hours in a Woman's Life	Nominated	
1982	Outstanding Actress in a Limited Series or Movie	A Woman Called Golda	Won	

=== Golden Globe Awards ===
Year	Category	Nominated work	Result	Ref.
1944	Best Actress in a Motion Picture – Drama	Gaslight	Won	
1945	Best Actress in a Motion Picture – Drama	The Bells of St. Mary's	Won	
1956	Best Actress in a Motion Picture – Drama	Anastasia	Won	
1958	Best Actress in a Motion Picture – Drama	The Inn of the Sixth Happiness	Nominated	
1958	Best Actress in a Motion Picture – Musical or Comedy	Indiscreet	Nominated	
1969	Best Actress in a Motion Picture – Musical or Comedy	Cactus Flower	Nominated	
1978	Best Actress in a Motion Picture – Drama	Autumn Sonata	Nominated	
1982	Best Actress in a Miniseries or Motion Picture – Television	A Woman Called Golda	Won	

=== Laurence Olivier Awards ===
Year	Category	Nominated work	Result	Ref.
1978	Actress of the Year in a Revival	Waters of the Moon	Nominated	

=== Tony Awards ===
Year	Category	Nominated work	Result	Ref.
1947	Best Leading Actress in a Play	Joan of Lorraine	Won	

== Miscellaneous awards ==
Organizations	Year	Category	Nominated work	Result	Ref.
Hollywood Women's Press Club	1946	Sour Apple Award (Least Cooperative Actress)	—N/a	Won	
Bambi Awards (Germany)	1950	Best Actress - International	Joan of Arc	Nominated	
Bambi Awards (Germany)	1951	Best Actress - International	Under Capricorn	Won	
Bambi Awards (Germany)	1951	Best Actress - International	Stromboli	Won	
Bambi Awards (Germany)	1952	Best Actress - International	Notorious	Won	
Bambi Awards (Germany)	1953	Best Actress - International	Europe '51	Won	
Bambi Awards (Germany)	1954	Best Actress - International	Journey to Italy	Won	
Bambi Awards (Germany)	1955	Best Actress - International	Fear	Nominated	
César Awards (France)	1976	Honorary César		Won	
David di Donatello Awards (Italy)	1957	Best Foreign Actress	Anastasia	Won	
David di Donatello Awards (Italy)	1979	Best Foreign Actress	Autumn Sonata	Won	
David di Donatello Awards (Italy)	1982	Golden Medal of the Minister of Tourism		Won	
Photoplay Awards	1947	Gold Medal	—N/a	Won	
Venice International Film Festival	1952	Volpi Cup for Best Actress (Note: The Volpi Cup was not awarded to her in 1952 because she was dubbed (by Lydia Simoneschi) in the version presented at the Festival. However, in 1992 she was awarded posthumously. The prize was accepted by her son Roberto Rossellini.)	Europe '51	Won	

== Critics' awards ==
Organizations	Year	Category	Nominated work	Result	Ref.
Nastro d'Argento Awards	1953	Best Actress	Europe '51	Won	
Los Angeles Film Critics Association	1978	Best Actress	Autumn Sonata	Nominated	
National Board of Review Awards	1958	Best Actress	The Inn of the Sixth Happiness	Won	
National Board of Review Awards	1978	Best Actress	Autumn Sonata	Won	
National Society of Film Critics Awards	1978	Best Actress	Autumn Sonata	Won	
New York Film Critics Circle Awards	1945	Best Actress	The Bells of St. Mary's	Won	
New York Film Critics Circle Awards	1945	Best Actress	Spellbound	Won	
New York Film Critics Circle Awards	1956	Best Actress	Anastasia	Won	
New York Film Critics Circle Awards	1978	Best Actress	Autumn Sonata	Won	
Online Film & Television Association Awards	1998	OFTA Film Hall of Fame	Herself	Won	

== Other awards ==
=== All-Time Rankings ===
All-Time Rankings
Rank	Organizations	Category	Ref.
1st	The Metropolist	Our top 10 Hollywood actresses from the 1940s	
3rd	AMC	The 50 Greatest Actresses of All Time	
4th	American Film Institute	100 Years...100 Stars	
5th	Film School WTF	Top 100 Best Hollywood Actresses Of All Time	
29th	TheWrap	The Best Actresses to Ever Win Oscars for Best Actress	

=== Hollywood Walk of Fame ===
Walk of Fame
Year	Category	Result	Ref.
1960	Hollywood Walk of Fame Star (Motion Picture Category)	Won	

== See also ==
- Ingrid Bergman performances
