= Renzo Rossellini =

Renzo Rossellini may refer to:

- Renzo Rossellini (composer) (1908–1982), Italian composer
- Renzo Rossellini (producer) (born 1941), Italian film producer
