= The Philosophers (series) =

French-Italian biographical film series

The Philosophers (I filosofi) is a French-Italian drama video-biographical film series, produced by the Istituto Luce and directed by the Italian film director Roberto Rossellini, in the period 1971-1974; a feature-length tetralogy chronicling the lives of Modern Age philosophers: Sócrates (1971), Blaise Pascal (1972), Augustine (1972) and, René Descartes (1974), together with the evolution of his theories in a philosophical perspective, and show moments in history when human consciousness undergoes a radical transformation.

== Antecedent ==
In 1965, Rossellini wrote a manifesto about the loss of contact between art and science. On one hand, the amelioration which science has brought to our lives has provoked “agitation, violence, indifference, ennui, anguish, spiritual inertia, passive resignation. Men today in developed countries seem no longer to have a sense of self or of things.” The civilization is in crisis and totally unprepared to face the challenges of a future. Art, on the other hand, has “in the last hundred years turned into complaining. It is the expression of moral discomfort, unhappiness, incomprehension, but that is all. This complaining is based on a refusal to know the world; we are complaining because we are confronted by a world whose architecture we cannot grasp.” Rossellini believed that we no longer possess the basic elements of a language for art. Our “art” has become infantile and corrupt.
