= Pia Lindström =

Swedish television reporter (born 1938)

- Born: Friedel Pia Lindström; 20 September 1938 (age 87); Stockholm, Sweden
- Other name: Jennie Ann Lindstrom
- Spouses: Fuller Earle Callaway III (m. 1960; div. 1961) Joseph Daly (m. 1971; div. 1990) John Carley (m. 2001)
- Children: 2
- Parent(s): Ingrid Bergman; Petter Lindström
- Relatives: Isabella Rossellini (maternal half-sister); Isotta Ingrid Rossellini (maternal half-sister)

Friedel Pia Lindström (born 20 September 1938) is a Swedish-American television journalist, and the first child of actress Ingrid Bergman.

== Life and career ==
Lindström is the only child born to Ingrid Bergman and her first husband, Swedish-American neurosurgeon Petter Lindström. She was greatly affected when her mother left her father for Italian director Roberto Rossellini. Petter Lindström sued for desertion and waged a custody battle with Bergman for their daughter, and Pia did not reunite with her mother until 1957. Her half-brother, Roberto Ingmar Rossellini, was born on 7 February 1950, and her mother married Roberto Rossellini on 24 May 1950. On 18 June 1952, Lindström's twin half-sisters Isabella Rossellini and Isotta Rossellini were born.

Lindström began her broadcasting career as a reporter at KGO-TV in San Francisco in 1966 and in 1971 went to WCBS-TV in New York City.

From 1973 to 1997, she was a news anchorwoman and also a theater and arts critic for WNBC-TV in New York City, and made television appearances and did some acting (in mostly Italian films) before she became a news correspondent. Her Italian films include Marriage Italian Style (1964), The Possessed (1965) and The Queens (1966). She received two Emmy Awards for news coverage and on-screen performance, as well as the Associated Press Broadcaster's Award. She is now retired.

== Personal life ==
Married three times, Lindström has two sons from her second marriage, to Joseph Daly. They married on December 28, 1971. She is currently married to attorney Jack H. Carley.
