= Gaumont Italia =

Italian film studio

- Logo used since 2026
- Type: Subsidiary
- Industry: Films (original); Television (relaunch)
- Founded: 1978 (original); 2022 (relaunch)
- Founder: Gaumont
- Defunct: 1984 (original)
- Fate: Closed (original)
- Headquarters: Rome, Italy
- Key people: Marco Rossi (president)
- Owner: Gaumont
- Members: 50 (2024)
- Parent: Gaumont
- Website: https://gaumont.it

Gaumont Italia is the Italian subsidiary of the French film company Gaumont, operational in two stages, the first between 1978 and 1984, and the second, since 2022. Several factors, including a corporate restructuring of its French parent, led to its closure in 1984.

== History ==
=== First subsidiary ===
Logo of the former version of the subsidiary

In 1978, Gaumont set up three new international subsidiaries, Gaumont Italia, Gaumont do Brasil and Gaumont, Inc. (this last one was to act as a distributor on behalf of Triumph Films). Its president was film producer Renzo Rossellini, under his tenure, a Gaumont film school (Scuola di Cinema Gaumont) opened in 1981 with the support of its corporate parent.

The company was affected by a 1982 law to counter the rise of pornographic productions released theatrically, which outlawed preventive censorship. The company announced during the 1982 Venice Film Festival that it would release its movies without screening authorization. This was halted when its opening night screening of The Eyes, the Mouth was aborted because the company had to wait a few days for an official visa. In November that year, the film censorship board rejected Querelle, a West German film, due to its themes, which had no moral or cultural resolution. In a provocative act, Gaumont Italia tried selling the film to a private television station: at the time, local stations operating in Italy aired adult movies. The company appealed and released the movie with minimal cuts on 11 February 1983.

In November 1983, Rossellini resigned as president of Gaumont Italia. The company was experiencing a crisis, with a small number of its fourteen titles released in the past two years (up until that time) generating revenues. The Italian film industry was on the decline, and only Gaumont and Italian state broadcaster RAI were the main financial supporters. The emergence of national private television networks owned by Silvio Berlusconi, who, through his production company Reteitalia, caused the dissolution of several film companies, also affected Gaumont, whose parent company in France opted to close the Italian subsidiary, among other international assets, to curb its financial losses.

=== Revival ===
Logo used from 2022 until 2026

On 25 January 2022, Gaumont re-entered the Italian market, opening new facilities in Rome, this time being involved in the production of TV series for linear TV and streaming services in the Italian language, under the presidency of Marco Rosi. In May 2022, Serena Lonigro and Mirko Cetrangolo joined the company.
