= Unanimal =

Unanimal is a 2025 documentary film by Tuva Björk and Sally Jacobson which explores the relationship between humans and animals. The film is narrated by Isabella Rossellini.
