= Isabella Rossellini =

Italian and American actress (born 1952)

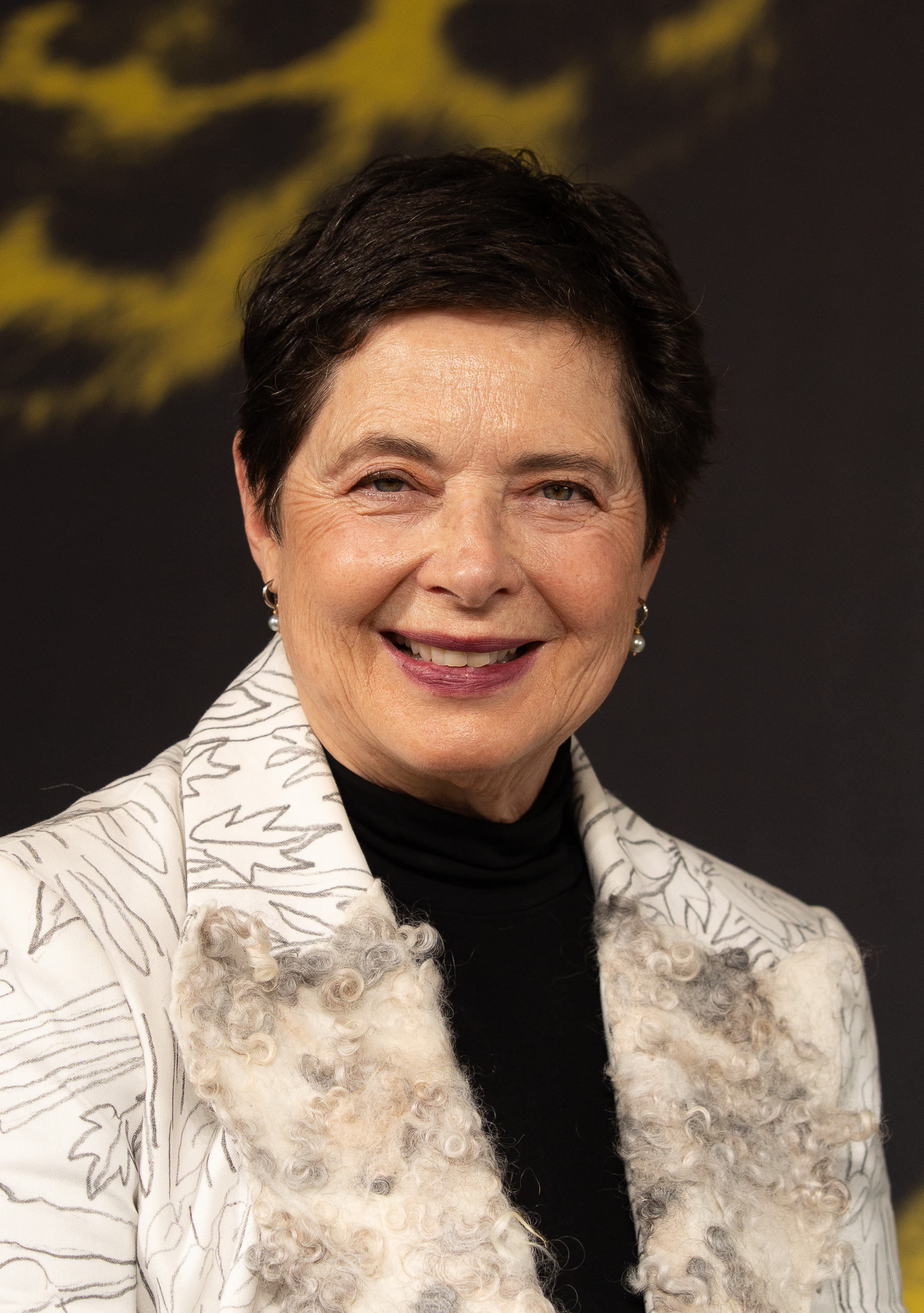
- Rossellini in 2026
- Born: Isabella Fiorella Elettra Giovanna Rossellini; 18 June 1952 (age 74); Rome, Lazio, Italy
- Citizenship: Italy; United States
- Education: New York University (BA); Hunter College (MA)
- Occupations: Actress; model
- Years active: 1976–present
- Spouses: Martin Scorsese (m. 1979; div. 1982); Jonathan Wiedemann (m. 1983; div. 1986)
- Partners: Luciano De Crescenzo (1973–1978); David Lynch (1986–1991); Gary Oldman (1994–1996)
- Children: 2, including Elettra Rossellini Wiedemann
- Parents: Roberto Rossellini (father); Ingrid Bergman (mother)
- Relatives: Isotta Ingrid Rossellini (twin sister); Pia Lindström (maternal half-sister); Renzo Rossellini (paternal half-brother)

Isabella Fiorella Elettra Giovanna Rossellini (Italian: [izaˈbɛlla rosselˈliːni]; born 18 June 1952) is an Italian-American actress and model. The daughter of Swedish actress Ingrid Bergman and Italian film director Roberto Rossellini, she is noted for her successful tenure as a Lancôme model and an established career in American and European cinema. She has received nominations for an Academy Award, two Golden Globe Awards, a British Academy Film Award, and a Primetime Emmy Award.

After making her acting debut with A Matter of Time (1976), Rossellini had her breakthrough role in David Lynch's Blue Velvet (1986) for which she received the Independent Spirit Award for Best Female Lead. She had a minor role in the box office hit Death Becomes Her (1992), and had further roles in Cousins (1989), Wild at Heart (1990), Fearless (1993), Wyatt Earp (1994), Big Night (1996), Roger Dodger (2002), Infamous (2006), Two Lovers (2008), Enemy (2013), Joy (2015), and La chimera (2023). She also voiced roles in Incredibles 2 (2018) and Marcel the Shell with Shoes On (2021). For playing the nun Sister Agnes in Conclave (2024), she garnered a nomination for an Academy Award for Best Supporting Actress.

Rossellini received a Golden Globe Award nomination for the HBO film Crime of the Century (1996). She received a Primetime Emmy Award for Outstanding Guest Actress in a Drama Series nomination for Chicago Hope (1997). She also has guest starred in the sitcoms Friends and 30 Rock as well as the dramas Alias and The Blacklist. She portrayed Simone Beck in the HBO series Julia (2022).

== Early life ==
Rossellini was born in Rome, Lazio Region, Italy, the daughter of Swedish actress Ingrid Bergman, who was half Swedish and half German, and Italian director Roberto Rossellini, who was born in Rome from a family originally from Pisa, Tuscany. She has three siblings from her mother: her fraternal twin sister Isotta Ingrid Rossellini, who is an adjunct professor of Italian literature, a brother, Robertino Ingmar Rossellini; and a half-sister, Pia Lindström, who formerly worked on television and is from her mother's first marriage to Petter Lindström. She has four other siblings from her father's two other marriages: Romano (who died at age nine), Renzo, Gil, and Raffaella. Growing up, she received "a liberal Catholic education".

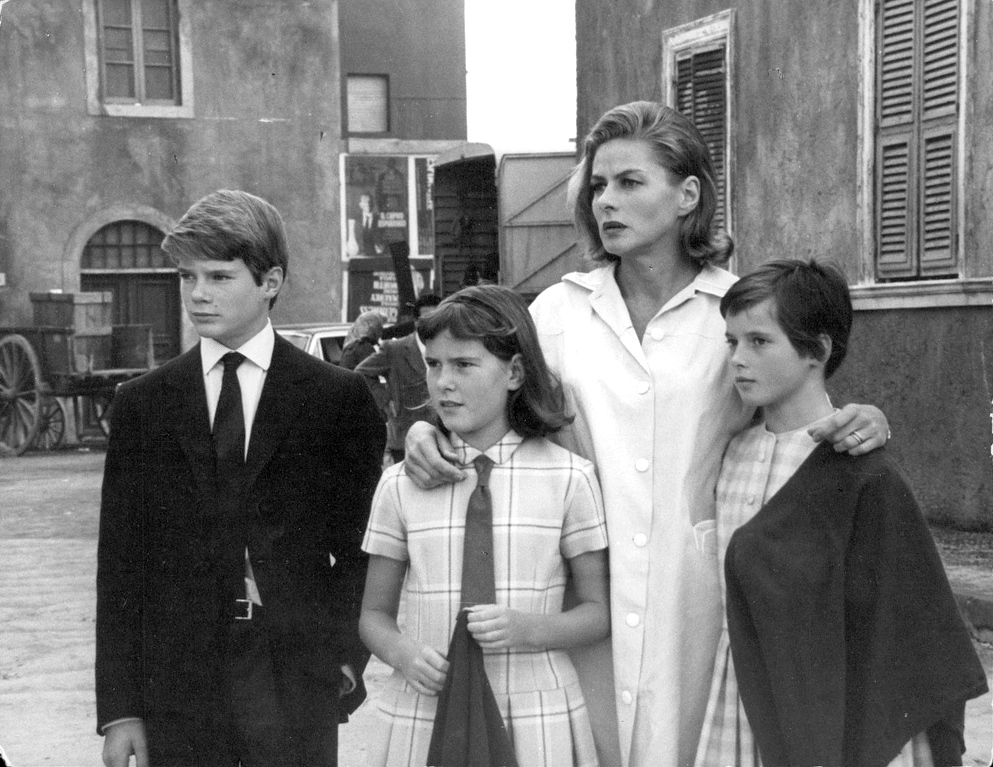
Isabella (right) with twin sister Isotta, brother Robertino and their mother Ingrid Bergman on the filming set of The Visit

Rossellini was raised in Rome, as well as in Santa Marinella and Paris. She underwent an operation for appendicitis at the age of five. At 11, she was diagnosed with scoliosis. To correct it, she had to undergo an 18-month ordeal of painful stretchings, body casts and surgery on her spine using pieces of one of her shin bones. Consequently, she has incision scars on her back and shin.

At 19, she went to New York City, where she attended Finch College, while working as a translator and as a television reporter for RAI, the Italian national public broadcasting company She also appeared intermittently on L'altra Domenica (The Other Sunday), a TV show featuring Roberto Benigni. However, she decided not to stay full-time in New York until her marriage to Martin Scorsese (1979–1982), whom she met when she interviewed him for RAI.

== Career ==
=== Modeling ===
At the age of 28, her modeling career began, when she was photographed by Bruce Weber for British Vogue and by Bill King for American Vogue. During her career, she has also worked with many other renowned photographers, including Richard Avedon, Steven Meisel, Helmut Newton, Peter Lindbergh, Norman Parkinson, Eve Arnold, Francesco Scavullo, Annie Leibovitz, Denis Piel, and Robert Mapplethorpe. Her image has appeared on such magazines as Marie Claire, Harper's Bazaar, Vanity Fair, and Elle. In March 1988, an exhibition dedicated to photographs of her, called Portrait of a Woman, was held at the Musée d'Art Moderne de Paris.

Rossellini's modeling career led her into the world of cosmetics, when she became the exclusive spokesmodel for the French cosmetics brand Lancôme in 1982, replacing Nancy Dutiel in the United States and Carol Alt in Europe. At Lancôme, in 1990, she was involved in product development for the fragrance Trésor. In 1996, when she was 43, she was removed as the face of Lancôme for being "too old". In 2016, at the age of 63, she was rehired by Lancôme's new female CEO, Francoise Lehmann, as a global brand ambassador for the company.

In October 1992, Rossellini modelled for Madonna's controversial book Sex. Rossellini also appeared in Madonna's music video for her single "Erotica", released in autumn 1992.

Rossellini was the inaugural brand ambassador for the Italian Silversea Cruises company in 2004, and she appeared in print ads and on their website. Barbara Muckermann, the senior vice-president of worldwide marketing and communications in 2004, said at the time of the announcement, "Isabella is the ideal personification of Silversea's exclusive standard of elegance, glamour and sophistication."

=== Film and television ===
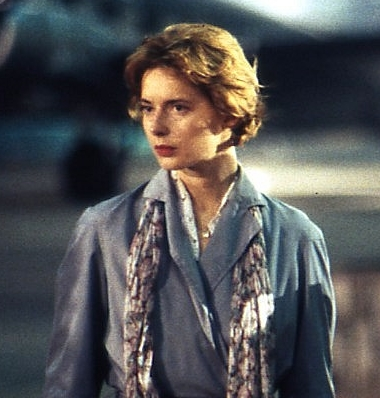
Rossellini on location at Tempelhof Airport in Berlin in 1992 to shoot some scenes for the film The Innocent

Rossellini made her film debut with a brief appearance as a nun opposite her mother in the 1976 film A Matter of Time. Her first role was the 1979 film The Meadow, and then in 1980 she appeared in Renzo Arbore's film In the Pope's Eye with her then husband Martin Scorsese.

Following her mother's death in 1982, Rossellini was cast in her first American film, White Nights (1985). This was followed by her notable role as the tortured nightclub singer Dorothy Vallens in the David Lynch film Blue Velvet, in which she also contributed her own singing, most notably covering "Blue Velvet" (1951). Other significant film roles during this period include her work in Cousins (1989), Death Becomes Her (1992), Fearless (1993), and Immortal Beloved (1994). In 1996, she appeared as herself in an episode of the TV series Friends called "The One with Frank Jr."

In 2003, Rossellini was a recurring character on the television series Alias. In that same year, she also appeared in the Canadian film The Saddest Music in the World, directed by Guy Maddin. In 2004, she played the High Priestess Thar in the Sci-Fi Channel miniseries Legend of Earthsea, and the director Robert Lieberman stated that Rossellini "brings a very big persona to the screen. She carries a great deal of beauty. We needed someone who had a feeling of authority to be this kind of mother superior type and at the same time not be totally dour and unattractive."

In 2006, Rossellini appeared in several television documentaries. First, she narrated a two-hour television special on Italy for the Discovery Channel's Discovery Atlas series. Then, alongside Segway PT inventor Dean Kamen, she spoke about her past and current activities on an episode of Iconoclasts, a series that featured on the Sundance Channel (known as SundanceTV from 2014 onwards), an independent film network founded by film industry veteran Robert Redford. The Sundance Channel then purchased the 2006 Guy Maddin-directed short film My Dad Is 100 Years Old, a tribute that Rossellini created for her father. In the film, she played almost every role, including Federico Fellini, Alfred Hitchcock and her mother, Ingrid Bergman. Rossellini's twin sister, Isotta Ingrid, criticized the short film, calling it an "inappropriate" tribute.

In 2007, Rossellini guest starred on two episodes of the television show 30 Rock, playing Alec Baldwin's character Jack Donaghy's ex-wife. Around the same time, Rossellini enrolled at New York University where she undertook an undergraduate degree in Art and Environmental Studies, and then pursued with a master's degree at Hunter College in New York to study animal behavior. Then the Sundance Channel commissioned her to contribute a short-film project to the environmental program The Green. Rossellini explained in a 2013 interview:

They contacted me again when they had allocated some money to experiment in making a web series. At first, I thought I didn't know what to say, I didn't know what to write and then thought it might be really fun to do little short films about animals. This is how the first three episodes of Green Porno came about. When I showed them the pilot, Sundance commissioned eight more. It was a huge hit!

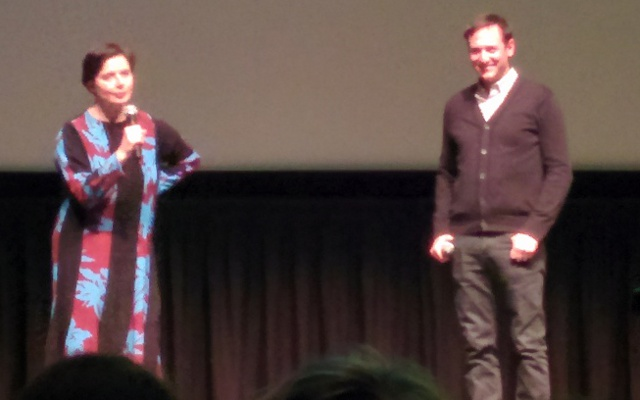
Rossellini worked on Green Porno with Jody Shapiro

Debuting in 2008, the first series of Green Porno had over 4 million views on YouTube and two further seasons were produced; there are 18 episodes in the series. Rossellini worked with a small budget for Green Porno and she was responsible for the scripts, helped to design the creatures, directed the episodes, and is the primary actor in the series. In each of the episodes, she acts out the mating rituals and reproductive behaviour of various animals while commentary is played.

Green Porno was followed by two other animal-themed television productions: Seduce Me: The Spawn of Green Porno and Mammas. Seduce Me: The Spawn of Green Porno is a five-episode online series that was premiered in mid-2010 and explores the topic of animal courtship. As with Green Porno, Rossellini wrote, directed and acted in the series; she is also a producer of the series. Rossellini explained in 2010, "I always wanted to make films about animals – there's not an enormous audience, but there's an enormous audience for sex."

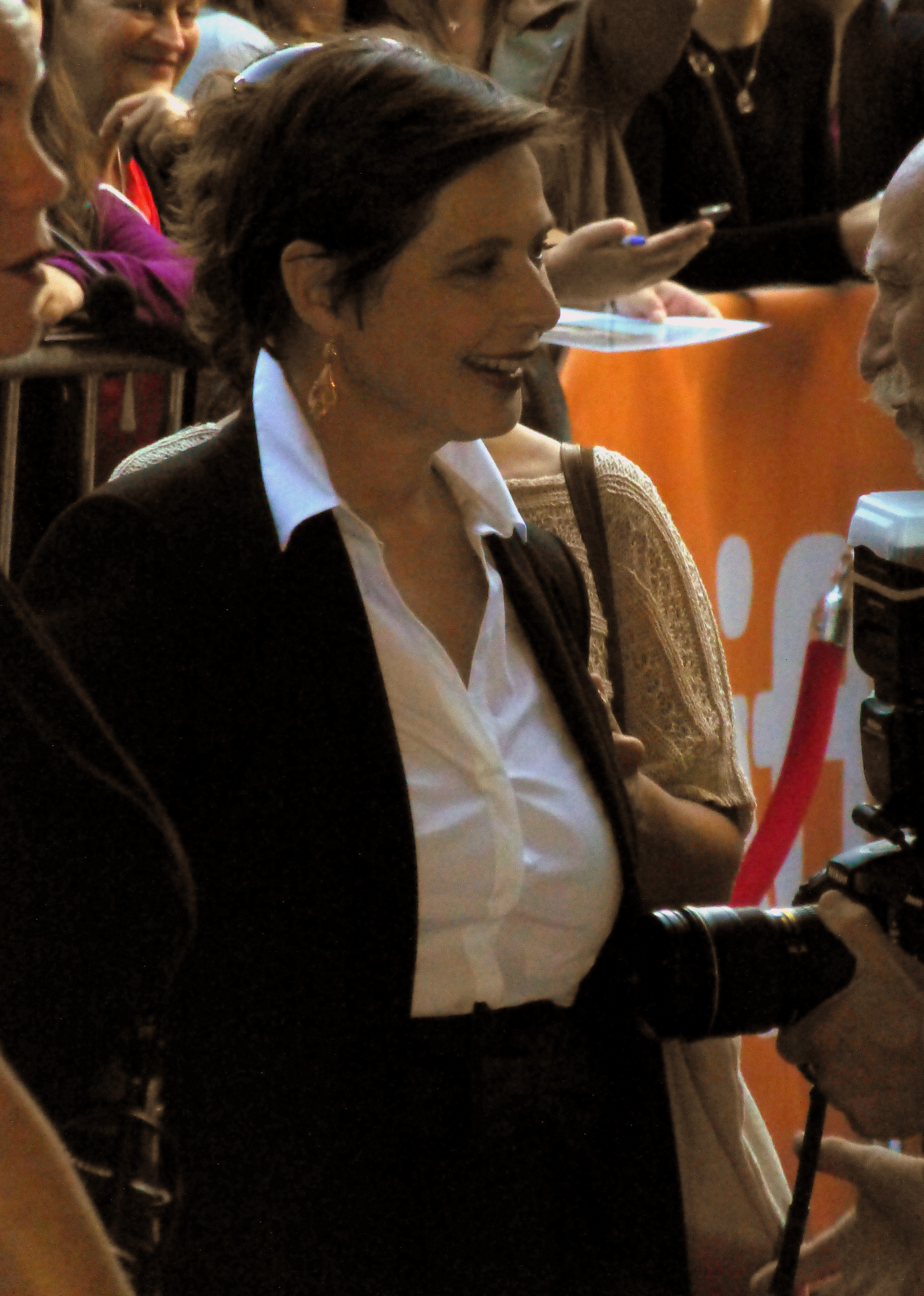
Rossellini at the 2013 Toronto Film Festival

Mammas debuted in the United States on 12 May 2013, Mother's Day weekend there, and is a celebration of the maternal aspects of the animal world. Rossellini is again the primary actor and plays the maternal versions of animals such as spiders and hamsters. Rossellini explained in a 2013 interview part of the research process for Mammas: "First of all it's about diversity. When talking about motherhood, I would find examples of ten different species that either don't get pregnant in the belly but in the mouth or back. Or species that abandon their children all-together so that I don't tell ten stories that are too similar."

After the completion of her Green Porno productions, Rossellini acted in the film Enemy, with Jake Gyllenhaal, which was shown at the 2013 Toronto International Film Festival (TIFF). Rossellini praised the film during a TIFF interview: "I love the subtlety of the film. It reminded me of Kafka. It's very metaphysical, but yet it's also a solid thriller. It made me leap up out of my seat at the end." Rossellini also played the silent film actor Rudolph Valentino's mother in Vladislav Alex Kozlov's Silent Life: The Story of the Lady in Black, a feature-length version of the director's silent, black-and-white short film Daydreams of Rudolph Valentino. Kozlov's film was due for release in 2012, but, as of February 2014, the film has not been officially released.

Rossellini was the president of the jury for the 61st Berlin International Film Festival in 2011. In April 2015, she was announced as the president of the jury for the Un Certain Regard section of the 2015 Cannes Film Festival.

In 2016, Rossellini was cast as Rita Marks, the matriarch of the Marks crime family in the Hulu original series, Shut Eye.

In 2023, Rossellini was honoured with Lifetime Achievement Award at the 18th Rome Film Festival.

In 2024, Rossellini received acclaim for her portrayal of Sister Agnes in the political drama, Conclave, opposite Ralph Fiennes, Stanley Tucci and John Lithgow, for which she received a Best Supporting Actress nomination at the 97th Academy Awards.

On February 15, 2025, it was announced that Rossellini would be joining the cast of Ryan Murphy's upcoming television series, The Beauty. On February 26, 2025, it was announced that she had been cast in Mike Newell's Wallis Simpson biopic, My Duchess, playing opposite Joan Collins. Rossellini is also set to star in Jeremiah Zagar's upcoming film The Painted Bride, alongside actors Jeremy Allen White and Mandy Patinkin.

The distribution rights to a documentary starring Rossellini, A Season with Isabella Rossellini, were secured by Escapade Media in September 2025. The documentary, directed by Marian Lacombe, sees Rossellini reflecting on her life as a celebrated model as well as her colorful life.

Rossellini was cast in Marco Perego's film Petrichor shot in Italy over the summer of 2025. In May 2026, it was announced that Rossellini had been cast and was currently filming Alice Rohrwacher's Three Incestuous Sisters.

== Stage and live performance ==
In 2004, Rossellini acted in an Off-Broadway production of Terrence McNally's The Stendhal Syndrome, with Richard Thomas.

Rossellini's friend, Carole Bouquet, also a model who later became an actress, suggested that Green Porno could be transformed into a lecture format with a longer duration. Bouquet then introduced Rossellini to the French filmmaker and screenwriter, Jean-Claude Carrière, and they created a 70-minute-long monologue that expands upon the Green Porno films. The structure of the performance is in accordance with the types of reproductive systems:

Some animals reproduce with male and female; some animals change sex – they start female and they end male or vice-versa. Some fish do that. Some animals are hermaphrodites – they don't need anybody, they have both vaginas and penises. Then we have animals that don't need sex at all, they just clone themselves.

In the live show, Rossellini explores the topics of homosexuality ("I think society has made the mistake of seeing the act of making love or mating as an act of reproduction, when actually it is used for other things, too. Animals use it for social events, bonding, solving conflict and so on.") and maternal instincts, and has explained that her research has influenced her perspective on societal notions of beauty: "If you look at nature, there is no perfection. Everything is always evolving and adapting according to whatever the environmental pressure. The more diversity there is, the more things are going to survive."

Rossellini debuted the live version of Green Porno at the Adelaide Festival of Arts on 15 March 2014 and was warmly received by the audience. The show was the first of the 2014 program to sell out. Much of the production and backstage documentary footage was shot and directed by her nephew, Tommaso Rossellini.

Rossellini's "smallest circus in the world", a stage play exploring the ability of animals to think, was premiered in May 2018, at the Jerome Robbins Theater of the Baryshnikov Arts Center. The play "addresses the scientific discoveries about animal minds, intelligence, and emotions. Joined onstage by various animals portrayed by Pan, her trained dog, Rossellini transforms herself into Aristotle, Descartes, B.F. Skinner, Charles Darwin, and more, to deliver a vivid monologue about the brilliance of the animal kingdom".

Rossellini performed "Link Link Circus" (as in Ring Ring) as a benefit for The Gateway Performing Arts Center of Suffolk County, in Bellport, New York, the south shore Long Island village where she is a local organic farmer. "Link Link Circus" is performed by Rossellini in a black and red ringmaster's tailcoat, with the assistance of her dog, Peter Pan, who performs a few tricks and is costumed as other animals including a chicken and a dinosaur. In addition to Rossellini and Pan, the production includes puppets, handled by puppeteer Schuyler Beeman, and still photos, home movies, animation and excerpts from her "Green Porno" film series projected on a large screen behind the set decorated with Rossellini's childhood toys, including a marionette stage and a toy upright piano, which Rossellini plays in the show. The set was designed by Andy Byers, who is also the costume designer and composer for the show. In promoting the show, which was performed twice at The Gateway, Rossellini appeared in Long Island's Newsday. Proceeds from The Gateway production of "Link Link Circus" also benefited The Plaza Cinema & Media Arts Center, a non-profit located near Rossellini's Bellport home in Patchogue, New York.

Rossellini has been a frequent guest narrator at Disney's Candlelight Processional at Walt Disney World, most recently appearing in the 2019 and 2022 seasons.

Rossellini is set to premiere a new one-woman show in March 2026. The show is expected to blend performance, personal storytelling, and reflections on art, nature, and identity.

== Activism ==
Rossellini is involved in conservation efforts. She is the president and director of the Howard Gilman Foundation – a leading institution focused on the preservation of wildlife, arts, photography and dance – and she has been a board member of the Wildlife Conservation Network. She received US$100,000 from Disney to help with her conservation efforts in those two organizations. She has also helped with the Central Park Conservancy, and is a major benefactor of the Bellport-Brookhaven Historical Society in Bellport, Long Island, where she is a part-time resident.

Rossellini is involved in training guide dogs for the blind. She is a former trustee of the George Eastman House and a 1997 George Eastman Award honoree for her support of film preservation. She is also a National Ambassador for the U.S. Fund for UNICEF.

== Personal life ==
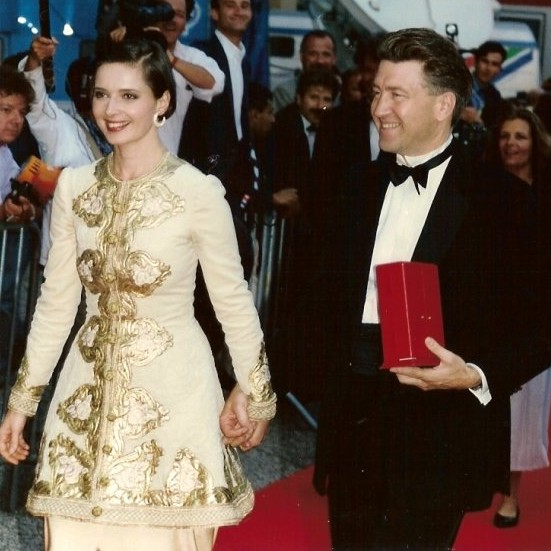
Rossellini with David Lynch at the Cannes Film Festival in 1990

Rossellini holds dual Italian and United States citizenship. She speaks Italian, French and English fluently. She is a naturalized American citizen.

From 1973 to 1978, she was in a relationship with Italian writer and director Luciano De Crescenzo.

Rossellini married filmmaker Martin Scorsese in 1979. After she and Scorsese divorced in 1982, Rossellini was married to Jon Wiedemann from 1983 to 1986. Rossellini has a daughter, Elettra Rossellini Wiedemann and an adopted son, Roberto.

Filmmaker David Lynch and Rossellini were a couple from 1986 to 1991. She was also engaged to actor Gary Oldman from 1994 to 1996.

She has always lived near her twin sister Isotta Ingrid, while growing up in Rome or residing in New York City.

Rossellini raises and trains future guide dogs for the Guide Dog Foundation.

== Filmography ==
Key
†	Denotes works that have not yet been released

=== Film ===
Year	Title	Role	Notes
1976	A Matter of Time	Sister Pia	
1979	The Meadow	Eugenia	
1980	In the Pope's Eye	Isabella	
1985	White Nights	Darya Greenwood	
1986	Blue Velvet	Dorothy Vallens	
1987	Tough Guys Don't Dance	Madeleine Regency	
1987	Siesta	Marie	
1987	Dark Eyes	Claudia	
1988	Zelly and Me	Mademoiselle Zelly	
1989	Cousins	Maria	
1989	Red Riding Hood	Lady Jean	
1990	Wild at Heart	Perdita Durango	
1990	Dames Galantes	Victoire	
1991	Caccia Alla Vedova	Rosanna	
1992	Death Becomes Her	Lisle von Rhuman	
1993	The Pickle	Planet Cleveland Woman	Uncredited
1993	The Innocent	Maria	
1993	Fearless	Laura Klein	
1994	Wyatt Earp	Big Nose Kate	
1994	Immortal Beloved	Anne Marie	
1995	Croce e delizia	Henriette	
1996	Big Night	Gabriella	
1996	The Funeral	Clara	
1998	Left Luggage	Mrs. Kalman	
1998	The Impostors	The Veiled Queen	
2000	Il Cielo cade	Kathcen	
2002	Empire	La Colombiana	
2002	Roger Dodger	Joyce	
2003	The Tulse Suitcases, Part 1: The Moab Story	Mme. Moitessier	
2003	The Saddest Music in the World	Lady Helen Port-Huntley	
2004	The Tulse Luper Suitcases, Part 2: Vauz to the Sea	Mme. Moitessier	
2004	Heights	Liz	
2004	King of the Corner	Rachel Spivak	
2005	The Feast of the Goat	Urania	
2005	My Dad Is 100 Years Old	Herself	
2006	The Architect	Julia Waters	
2006	Infamous	Marella Agnelli	
2006	Brand upon the Brain!	Narrator	Theatrical run
2007	The Last Jews of Libya	Narrator	
2008	The Accidental Husband	Mrs. Bollenbecker	
2009	Two Lovers	Ruth Kraditor	
2009	My Dog Tulip	Ms. Cavenenini	Voice
2010	The Solitude of Prime Numbers	Adele	
2011	Keyhole	Haycinth	
2011	Chicken with Plums	Parvine	
2011	Silent Life	Gabriella	
2011	Late Bloomers	Mary	
2013	Enemy	Mother	
2014	The Zigzag Kid	Lola	
2015	Closet Monster	Buffy	Voice
2015	Joy	Trudy	
2018	Incredibles 2	Ambassador Henrietta Selick	Voice
2018	Vita & Virginia	Lady Sackville	
2019	Preludio- Il Film	Voice	
2021	Land of Dreams	Jane	
2021	Marcel the Shell with Shoes On	Connie	Voice
2023	Cat Person	Dr. Enid Zabala	
2023	A Season with Isabella Rossellini	Herself	
2023	Problemista	Narrator	
2023	La chimera	Flora	
2024	Spaceman	Commissioner Tuma	
2024	Conclave	Sister Agnes	
2025	Unanimal	Narrator	
2026	Silent Life: The Rudolph Valentino Centennial Final Cut	Valentino's Mother	
2026	Farm to Fashion	Herself	Short
2026	My Duchess	Suzanne Blum	
2027	Gatto †	Contessa	Voice
TBA	Silent Retreat †	Michelle Keaton	Post-production
TBA	Petrichor †	TBA	Post-production
TBA	The Three Incestuous Sisters †	TBA	Filming

=== Television ===
Year	Title	Role	Notes
1989–1990	The Tracey Ullman Show	Mae	3 episodes
1990	Ivory Hunters	Maria DiConti	Television film
1991	Lies of the Twins	Rachel Marks	Television film
1993	Fallen Angels	Babe Lonsdale	Episode: "The Frightening Frammis"
1994	The Gift	Gabriella	Television film
1995	Tales from the Crypt	Betty Spinelli	Episode: "You, Murderer"
1996	Friends	Herself	Episode: "The One with Frank Jr."
1996	Crime of the Century	Anna Hauptmann	Television film
1997	Chicago Hope	Professor Marina Giannini	2 episodes
1997	The Odyssey	Athena	Miniseries; 2 episodes
1998	Merlin	Nimue	Miniseries; 2 episodes
1999	The Simpsons	Astrid Weller	Voice, episode: "Mom and Pop Art"
2000	Don Quixote	The Duchess	Television film
2002	Napoléon	Joséphine de Beauharnais	4 episodes
2003	Monte Walsh	Countess Martine	Television film
2004	Earthsea	Thar	Miniseries; 2 episodes
2004–2005	Alias	Katya Derevko	5 episodes
2006	Infected	Carla Plume	Television film
2006	Filthy Gorgeous	Antonia	Television film
2007	30 Rock	Bianca Donaghy	2 episodes
2008–2009	Green Porno	Various animals and insects	18 episodes
2009	The Phantom	Dr. Bella Lithia	2 episodes
2012	Treme	Theresa	Episode: "I Thought I Heard Buddy Bolden Say"
2013	The Blacklist	Floriana Campo	Episode: "The Freelancer"
2016–2017	Shut Eye	Rita Marks	20 episodes
2019	Tuca & Bertie	Pat	Voice, episode: "The Jelly Lakes"
2020–2021	The Owl House	Bat Queen	Voice, 3 episodes
2021	Domina	Balbina	Episode: "Rise"
2022	Los Espookys	Herself	Episode: "El Eclipse (The Eclipse)"
2022–2023	Julia	Simone Beck	6 episodes
2023	Human Resources	General Malice	Voice, 3 episodes
2025	Jurassic World: Chaos Theory	Nonna	Voice, 6 episodes
2025	The Loud House	Nonna Viola	Voice, episode: "Europe Road Trip: Nonna Your Business"
2025	Mr. Scorsese	Herself	2 episodes
2026	The Beauty	Franny Forst	Recurring role

=== Video games ===
Year	Title	Role	Notes
1996	Goosebumps: Escape from Horrorland	Lady Cadaver	Voice role
1997	Ceremony of Innocence	Sabine Strohem	Voice role

=== Music videos ===
Year	Title	Role	Musician	Notes
1992	"Erotica"	Herself	Madonna	Cameo

== Awards and recognition ==
Also in 1997, Rossellini was awarded The George Eastman Award. In 1998, she received an Honourable Mention at the 48th Berlin International Film Festival for her role in the film Left Luggage. In 2013, she was awarded with the Berlinale Camera at the 63rd Berlin International Film Festival. In 2016, she was granted an honorary doctorate by the Université du Québec à Montréal.

Association	Year	Category	Work	Result	Ref.
AARP Movies for Grownups Awards	2024	Best Supporting Actress	Conclave	Nominated	
Academy Awards	2024	Best Supporting Actress	Conclave	Nominated	
Alliance of Women Film Journalists	2024	Best Supporting Actress	Conclave	Won	
Alliance of Women Film Journalists	2024	Best Ensemble Cast and Casting Director	Conclave	Won (Note: Shared with the cast.)	
Astra Film Awards	2024	Best Cast Ensemble	Conclave	Nominated	
Austin Film Critics Association	2024	Best Ensemble	Conclave	Nominated	
Berlin International Film Festival	1998	Special Mention	Left Luggage	Honored	
Berlin International Film Festival	2013	Berlinale Camera	—N/a	Honored	
British Academy Film Awards	2024	Best Actress in a Supporting Role	Conclave	Nominated	
Capri Hollywood International Film Festival	2024	Best Supporting Actress	Conclave	Won	
Critics' Choice Movie Awards	2024	Best Supporting Actress	Conclave	Nominated	
Critics' Choice Movie Awards	2024	Best Acting Ensemble	Conclave	Won	
European Film Awards	2024	European Achievement in World Cinema	—N/a	Honored	
Florida Film Critics Circle	2024	Best Supporting Actress	Conclave	Nominated	
Florida Film Critics Circle	2024	Best Ensemble	Conclave	Won	
Golden Globe Awards	1996	Best Actress in a Mini-Series or Television Film	Crime of the Century	Nominated	
Golden Globe Awards	2024	Supporting Actress - Motion Picture	Conclave	Nominated	
Houston Film Critics Society	2024	Best Supporting Actress	Conclave	Nominated	
Houston Film Critics Society	2024	Best Ensemble Cast	Conclave	Won	
Independent Spirit Awards	1986	Best Female Lead	Blue Velvet	Won	
Locarno Film Festival	2026	Excellence Award	—N/a	Honored	
London Film Critics' Circle	2024	Supporting Actress of the Year	Conclave	Nominated	
National Board of Review	2024	Best Ensemble	Conclave	Won	
New York Film Critics Online	2024	Best Ensemble	Conclave	Won	
Online Association of Female Film Critics	2024	Best Supporting Actress	Conclave	Nominated	
Online Film Critics Society	2024	Best Supporting Actress	Conclave	Nominated	
Primetime Emmy Awards	1997	Outstanding Guest Actress in a Drama Series	Chicago Hope	Nominated	
San Diego Film Critics Society	2024	Best Ensemble	Conclave	Runner-up	
San Francisco Bay Area Film Critics Circle	2024	Best Supporting Actress	Conclave	Nominated	
Satellite Awards	2024	Best Actress in a Supporting Role	Conclave	Nominated	
Satellite Awards	2024	Best Ensemble	Conclave	Nominated	
Saturn Awards	1993	Best Supporting Actress	Death Becomes Her	Won	
Screen Actors Guild Awards	2024	Outstanding Performance by a Cast in a Motion Picture	Conclave	Won	
Seattle Film Critics Society	2024	Best Supporting Actress	Conclave	Nominated	
St. Louis Film Critics Association	2024	Best Ensemble	Conclave	Won	
UK Film Critics Association	2024	Best Supporting Actress	Conclave	Won	
Washington D.C. Area Film Critics Association	2024	Best Supporting Actress	Conclave	Nominated	
Washington D.C. Area Film Critics Association	2024	Best Ensemble	Conclave	Won	

== See also ==
- List of Italian Academy Award winners and nominees

== Bibliography ==
Rossellini has written four books:

- Some of Me (1997)
- Looking at Me (2002)
- In the name of the Father, the Daughter and the Holy Spirits: Remembering Roberto Rossellini (2006)
- My Chickens and I (2018)

The third title was published as a written tribute alongside the short film, My Dad Is 100 Years Old, and used the script from the short film as its basis. To accompany the third series of Green Porno, Rossellini produced a multimedia collection that contains a book and DVD, both of which give additional information for the series' third season. These were released in 2008. Further backstage material was released filmed by her nephew, Tommaso.
