= La Vispa Teresa =

- Directed by: Roberto Rossellini
- Release date: 1939
- Running time: 7 minutes
- Country: Italy
- Language: Italian

La Vispa Teresa (English: Lively Teresa) is a 1939 Italian, black and white short film directed by Roberto Rossellini. A short nature-themed film, it features a girl catching a butterfly, but is thwarted by other insects. The film is about seven minutes long.

== Plot ==
The film is based on a nursery rhyme with the same name by the famous Italian writer, Luigi Sailer. It centers around a young girl, Teresa, trying to who tries to catch a butterfly but is thwarted by other insects.

The film emphasizes observation of nature and insect life in a simple, visual style typical of Rossellini's early experimental shorts.

== See also ==
- Roberto Rossellini
- Italian neorealism
