= Isotta Ingrid Rossellini =

Italian writer and academic (born 1952)

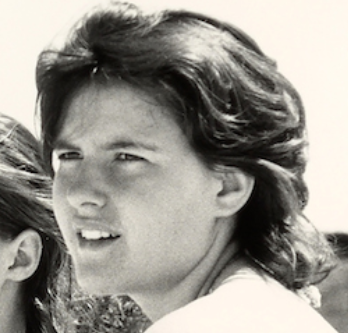
- Rossellini in 1965
- Born: Isotta Ingrid Giuliana Frieda Rossellini; 18 June 1952 (age 74); Rome, Italy
- Education: Columbia University (BA, MA, PhD)
- Occupations: Writer; academic
- Spouses: Alberto Acciarito (divorced) Richard Aborn (m. 1990)
- Children: 2
- Parents: Roberto Rossellini (father); Ingrid Bergman (mother)
- Relatives: Isabella Rossellini (twin sister); Pia Lindström (maternal half-sister); Renzo Rossellini (paternal half-brother); Elettra Rossellini Wiedemann (niece)

Isotta Ingrid Giuliana Frieda Rossellini (born 18 June 1952) is an Italian writer and academic.

== Early life ==
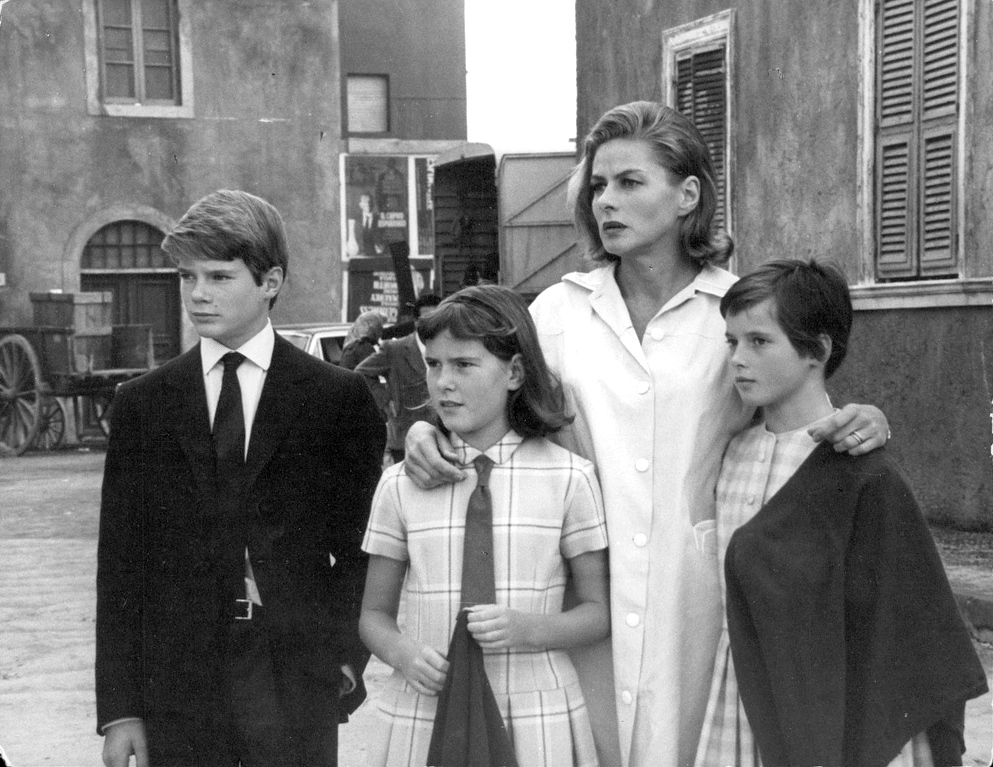
Rossellini with her mother, Ingrid Bergman, and siblings, Robertino and Isabella, on the set of The Visit in 1963

Rossellini was born in Rome, the daughter of director Roberto Rossellini and actress Ingrid Bergman, and the twin sister of actress Isabella Rossellini. After her parents' divorce, she and her siblings lived in a hotel in Rome for two years while their custody arrangement was determined. She worked as a makeup artist on the film A Matter of Time (1975), in which her mother starred.

== Career ==
Rossellini earned a bachelor's degree, master's degree, and doctorate in Italian literature from Columbia University. She has taught Italian literature at New York University, Princeton University, and Columbia University. She has also given lectures on her father's films.

In September 2015, she and her sisters hosted Ingrid Bergman: A Centennial Celebration at the Museum of Modern Art. In 2018, she published a book titled Know Thyself: Western identity from classical Greece to the Renaissance. That year, she also wrote opinion pieces for The New York Times and Literary Hub.

== Personal life ==
Rossellini has two children: Tommaso, from her first marriage to Alberto Acciarito, and Francesca, from her second marriage to Richard Aborn.

== Bibliography ==
- Rossellini, Ingrid (1995). Nel trapassar del segno: idoli della mente ed echi della vita nei Rerum vulgarium fragmenta (in Italian). Firenze: L.S. Olschki. ISBN 978-8822243683.
- Rossellini, Ingrid (2018). Know Thyself: Western identity from classical Greece to the Renaissance (1 ed.). New York: Doubleday. ISBN 978-0385541893.
