= Renzo Rossellini (producer) =

Italian film producer

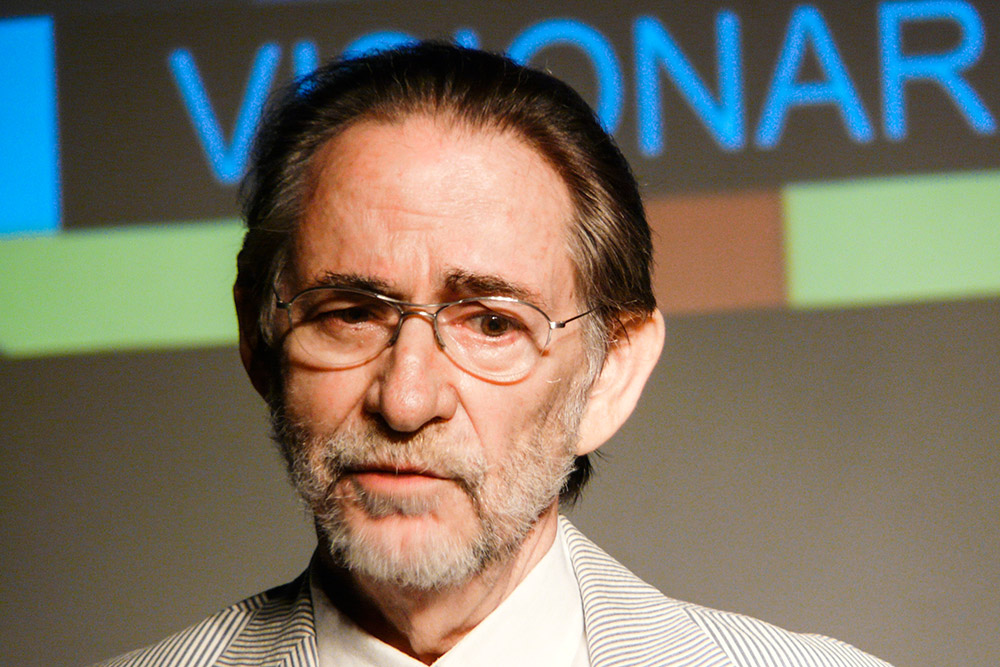
- Born: 24 August 1941 (age 85); Rome, Kingdom of Italy
- Occupations: Film producer, screenwriter
- Years active: 1953–present
- Children: 4
- Parents: Roberto Rossellini (father); Marcella De Marchis (mother)
- Relatives: Isabella Rossellini (paternal half-sister); Isotta Ingrid Rossellini (paternal half-sister)

Renzo Rossellini (born 24 August 1941), also called Rossellini Jr., is an Italian film producer. He is the second son of costume designer Marcella de Marchis and film director Roberto Rossellini. Since 1964, he has produced 64 films.

From 1977 to 1983 he was President of Gaumont Italy and was instrumental in the modernization of Italian film theaters, introducing multiplex structures. In 1975 he co-founded Radio Città Futura in Rome, one of the first "free" – not state-owned – radio stations in Italy. In 1981, one year after the Soviet invasion of Afghanistan, he co-founded Radio Free Kabul. He lives in Rome and Los Angeles.

== Learning from his father ==
In 1958, Renzo Rossellini graduated from the Accademia di Belle Arti di Venezia with a degree in Visual Arts. After graduation, he began working in the film industry, while studying History and Philosophy at the Sorbonne University in Paris, albeit without graduating. In those years, he began a relationship Katherine L. O'Brien. They had a son named Alessandro.

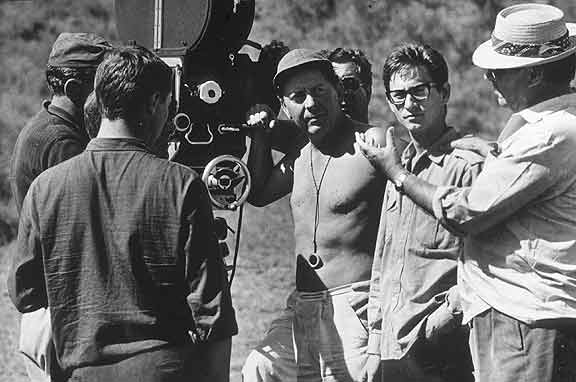
From right: Roberto Rossellini, Renzo Rossellini and Carlo Carlini on set (1964)

From 1959 to 1977, Renzo worked with his father Roberto as assistant director, second unit director, and producer. Together, they made a number of movies and TV mini-series, mainly documentaries for Italian state television RAI. He then married Patrizia Mannajuolo, his first wife.

In 1962, he directed a segment of the film Love at Twenty, which was nominated at the 12th Berlin International Film Festival.In the sixties, he filmed and produced newsreels on the birth of several national liberation movements with his San Diego Film Company, ranging from the Algerian National Liberation Front, the Palestine Liberation Organization, and the Mozambican Liberation Front. In 1966, while in Cuba, he took part to the foundation of Tricontinental, the organization built by Ernesto "Che" Guevara to promote national liberation's movements in Africa, Asia, and Latin America, in which he represented the Algerian population.

== Political Activism and Free Radios ==
In the early seventies he became a member of Avanguardia operaia, an organization of the Italian new left-wing political party. At that time, he founded the Italian National Committee against fascism in the Mediterranean with director Cesare Zavattini, actor and Nobel Prize winner Dario Fo, and director Mario Monicelli.

During those years, he lived with Chantal Personè. They had a daughter named Rossa.

In 1975, in Rome with publisher Giulio Savelli and the support from several Feminist groups, militants of Avanguardia operaia and of Partito di Unità Proletaria per il Comunismo he established Radio Città Futura, RCF, one of the major Italian free radios. In Italy, from the Fascist Thirties up to the Democratic Seventies, the only radios allowed to exist were those owned by the Government. The movement's radios of Italy set up the Federation of Democratic Italian Radios, or FRED. FRED's members, differentiating themselves from purely commercial radios, introduced the talk radio practice to the Italian audience, bringing to the forefront with interviews and live broadcasts, people and their lives' happenings. Rossellini was subsequently elected President of FRED.

In the general political elections of June 1976, like Italian screenwriter Ugo Pirro, he endorsed the Proletarian Democracy party, a coalition representing the major groups of the Italian new left.

== Death of Roberto and birth of Gaumont Italy ==
Over Christmas 1976, five months before dying, Roberto Rossellini wrote to his son Renzo a letter, which is both a summary of their relationship and a concise spiritual testament. In it, Roberto apologized for not having followed his son's inclinations and left him the task to protect and promote his audiovisual encyclopedic project. In 1977, when his father Roberto died, he took care of the large Rossellini family and became President of Gaumont Italy, the newly formed Italian branch of French-based multinational film company Gaumont, which he led until 1983. In 1978, due to the Aldo Moro Kidnapping, he was accused by the media to have foretold the kidnapping live on Radio Città Futura two hours before it actually happened. Rossellini explained that, on the morning of the kidnapping while reviewing and commenting the press, he had merely mentioned a political hypothesis. He pointed out that, on the day in which the Italian Democratic Christian party was forming a government with the explicit back up of the Italian Communist Party, this new event would most certainly lead to an attack from the Red Brigades.

In January 1979, a neofascist commando from the Nuclei Armati Rivoluzionari assaulted with automatic rifles and gunned the headquarters of Radio Città Futura, wounding five women and setting fire to their offices and transmitters. This happened just as Renzo finished reading the morning press news.

During his seven years as president of Gaumont Italy, he produced and distributed more than 100 movies.

He produced a few movies with a number of established Italian directors like Federico Fellini, Mario Monicelli, Liliana Cavani, Marco Ferreri, Lina Wertmüller, Carlo Lizzani, Francesco Rosi, Michelangelo Antonioni and Marco Bellocchio. He also promoted new younger talents, such as Nanni Moretti. He encouraged TV directors to try wide screen movies, as with Gianni Amelio. In 1984, he produced Francesca Comencini's first movie.

Following the example of the French Gaumont, he built a company encompassing the movie industry's three main branches: production, distribution, and theaters. From 1979, with the help of French funds, Rossellini bought a part of ECI (Esercizi Cinematografici Italiani), the Italian State-owned movie theater company, which was on the verge of bankruptcy.

In 1980, while arguing about a new rise in ticket prices favored by Italian movie distributors, Rossellini proposed instead to increase the number of spectators through introducing discounted prices for youth and elderly people to the introduction of multiplex theaters, like in France and the United States. During Rossellini's leadership of Gaumont Italy, in autumn of 1982, the historical Fiamma theatre was split in two screens of 800 and 250 seats respectively. Restructuring of the Odeon theater in Milan into eight screens proved to be much more difficult and lengthy. It began in 1980 and was completed six years later, three years after Rossellini's resignation as president of Gaumont Italy.

Another noteworthy Rossellini's initiative was the creation of the Gaumont Film School in 1981. Notable alumni include directors Daniele Luchetti, Carlo Carlei, Antonello Grimaldi, as well as producer Domenico Procacci.

== Radio-free Kabul ==
While serving as President of Gaumont Italy, Rossellini continued his political activism. In the summer of 1981, a group of French and defected East European intellectuals consisting of Bernard-Henri Lévy, Marek Halter, and Vladimir Bukovsky decided to organize a non-armed operation to oppose the Soviet occupation of Afghanistan. The project of the Paris based group was to help the Afghan partisans to build their radio, Radio Free Kabul, RFK.Rossellini was the operating arm of the RFK committee. In August 1981, he secretly travelled to Afghanistan, bringing with him three FM transmitters and the experience gained with Radio Città Futura. His reference in Afghanistan was the partisan commander Ahmad Shah Massoud. When Rossellini left Afghanistan, all resistance groups but one have their united radio, reaching through repeaters the Afghan capital Kabul. Radio programs are in Pashto and in Dari, with a ten minutes prerecorded part in Russian. "The radio you have brought us is worth more than a thousand Kalashnikovs", is the comment of an anonymous partisan commander to French human rights activists.

Radio Free Kabul remained on air for more than two years. It was closed at the end of 1983 and followed by two different AM radio stations. Nonetheless, the radio survived the fourth, fifth and sixth Soviet Panjshir offensives, with her score of wounded and killed technicians. One of the most popular parts of RFK programs is a 15-minute letter box, where queries from listeners in Kabul, the resistance-held areas, and the refugee camps in Pakistan were answered.

Some months after the disclosure of Rossellini's role in establishing RFK in Afghanistan, the Italian Red Brigades plan to kidnap Rossellini, for his role as one of the leaders of French multinational Gaumont. Germano Maccari, member of the Roman column of the Red Brigades, told Rossellini years later that he followed him for two months and that the operation was canceled because the manager carried a weapon.

== End of Gaumont adventure and bad car incident ==
In November 1983, Rossellini resigned as president and general manager of Gaumont Italy. In the previous two years the company had suffered significant losses. Of the fourteen movies produced in the last two years, only a handful generated revenues. In an interview, Rossellini declared: "I'm the president of a company that, in a year, suffered a dozen failures by promoting a policy of film d'auteur. Of course I feel responsible. Resigning from president was the obvious and right thing to do". Part of the problem came from the majority shareholder, French Gaumont, which decided to stop financing the Italian experiment as it wanted only to retain Gaumont Italy's theater chain or to sell it to get back the initial investment.

In spring 1984, Rossellini established Artisti Associati, a movie production and distribution company, whose major success is co-production and distribution of 9½ Weeks by Adrian Lyne.

On December 8, 1984, a day before leaving for the United States, Rossellini and his wife Elisabetta Caracciolo suffer a car accident. At the outskirts of Rome, the couple's car was pushed by two other cars out of the road and off of a cliff. Rossellini suffered multiple femur ruptures, and his wife Elisabetta ended up in a coma.

In the following months, Rossellini devoted much of his time to recover and to take care of Elisabetta. She died on the 14th of April, 1985.

== Recent activities ==
From 1987 to 2000, he took care of international marketing for movie production companies, as Phyllis Carlyle Productions, HKM Films, and Shadow Hill Productions.

In Los Angeles, California on June 7, 1989, Renzo met and married Victoria Kifferstein, his third wife. Victoria Rossellini is a lawyer and joined 20th Century Fox in 1992. In 2016, she was promoted to Senior Executive Vice President of the company.

In the second millennium, he devotes time to teaching movie and TV production for Rome's Nuova Università del Cinema e della Televisione; History of European Cinema at UCLA, at Salerno's Fisciano University, and at Naples Federico II University; Cinema History at Cuba's EICTV, and at Santo Domingo University; Movie aesthetics at Montreal's Quebec University.

In 2006 he directed Diritto di sognare, a documentary on the Italian Mafia. In 2010 he co-produced Born in U.S.E., directed by Michele Diomà. The movie is dedicated to the 120 years of the movie industry, and features Francesco Rosi, Giuseppe Tornatore and Luis Bacalov.

He works with the help of Gabriella Boccardo in maintaining, valorizing and distributing in the new media the memory of his father Roberto and his works.

== Filmography ==
=== Producer, co-producer and associate producer ===
Year	Title	Director	Notes
1967	Idea di un'isola	Roberto Rossellini	Producer, TV Movie Documentary
1969	Atti degli apostoli	Roberto Rossellini	Producer, TV Miniseries, 5 episodes
1970	Da Gerusalemme a Damasco	Roberto Rossellini	Producer
1971	Socrates	Roberto Rossellini	Producer, TV movie
1971	Rice University (film)	Beppe Cino, Roberto Rossellini	Producer, TV Movie Documentary
1971	Policeman	Sergio Rossi	Producer
1971	Equinozio	Maurizio Ponzi	Producer
1972	Blaise Pascal	Roberto Rossellini	Producer, TV movie
1972	Agostino d'Ippona	Roberto Rossellini	Producer, TV movie
1972-1973	L'età di Cosimo de Medici	Roberto Rossellini	Producer, TV mini-series, 3 episodes
1973	Intervista a Salvador Allende: La forza e la ragione	Emidio Greco	Producer, TV short documentary, Roberto Rossellini interviews Salvador Allende
1973	História do Brasil	Glauber Rocha	Producer, Documentary
1974	Cartesius	Roberto Rossellini	Producer, TV mini-series, 2 episodes
1978	Orchestra Rehearsal	Federico Fellini	Associate producer
1979	Seeking Asylum	Marco Ferreri	Co-producer, associate producer
1979	To Forget Venice	Franco Brusati	Associate producer
1979	Womanlight	Costa-Gavras	Co-producer
1979	Don Giovanni	Joseph Losey	Co-producer
1980	Death Watch	Bertrand Tavernier	Associate producer, uncredited
1980	City of Women	Federico Fellini	Producer
1980	Le Guignolo	Georges Lautner	Co-producer
1981	The Salamander	Peter Zinner	Co-producer
1981	The Skin	Liliana Cavani	Producer
1981	Three Brothers	Francesco Rosi	Associate producer, co-produced by Giorgio Nocella, Antonio Macri e Renzo Rossellini
1981	Sweet Dreams	Nanni Moretti	Producer
1981	La festa perduta	Pier Giuseppe Murgia	Producer
1981	Il marchese del Grillo	Mario Monicelli	Producer
1982	That Night in Varennes	Ettore Scola	Producer
1982	Blow to the Heart	Gianni Amelio	Associate producer, co-producer
1982	The Magic Mountain	Hans W. Geissendörfer	Associate producer, co-producer
1982	Fitzcarraldo	Werner Herzog	Associate producer
1982	Identification of a Woman	Michelangelo Antonioni	Associate producer, uncredited
1982	The Good Soldier	Franco Brusati	Associate producer
1982	Fanny & Alexander	Ingmar Bergman	Co-producer, uncredited
1983	Danton	Andrzej Wajda	Associate producer, uncredited
1983	Moon in the Gutter	Jean-Jacques Beineix	Co-producer, uncredited
1983	Nostalghia	Andrei Tarkovsky	Executive producer
1983	The House of the Yellow Carpet	Carlo Lizzani	Associate producer, uncredited
1983	Lontano da dove	Francesca Marciano	Producer, Executive producer
1983	Benvenuta	André Delvaux	Co-producer
1983	A Joke of Destiny	Lina Wertmüller	Co-producer
1983	Fanny och Alexander	Ingmar Bergman	Co-producer, uncredited, TV mini-series,
1983	E la nave va	Federico Fellini	Associate producer
1984	Henry IV	Marco Bellocchio	Co-producer
1984	Good King Dagobert	Dino Risi	Producer
1984	Desiderio	Anna Maria Tatò	Producer
1984	Carmen	Francesco Rosi	Co-producer
1984	Pianoforte	Francesca Comencini	Producer, debut film of director Francesca Comencini
1985	Juke Box	Carlo Carlei, Enzo Civitareale, Sandro De Santis, Antonello Grimaldi, Valerio Jalongo, Daniele Luchetti, Michele Scura	Producer, movie of the Gaumont Italia School of cinema
1986	9½ Weeks	Adrian Lyne	Co-producer
1987	Il mistero del panino assassino	Giancarlo Soldi	Producer, video
2003	Red Riding Hood	Giacomo Cimini	Co-executive producer
2009	La fisica dell'acqua	Felice Farina	Producer
2010	La nuova armata Brancaleone	Mario Monicelli	Producer, credit only
2011	L'era legale	Enrico Caria	Producer

=== Director ===
- Love at Twenty (1962)
- L'età del ferro, TV mini-series, 5 episodes (1965)
- La lotta dell'uomo per la sua sopravvivenza, TV series, 12 episodes (1970)
- The World Population, TV documentary (1974)
- Controsud, supervisor, (2004)

=== Second Unit Director and Assistant Director ===
- General Della Rovere (1959)
- Furore di vivere (1959)
- Era notte a Roma (1960)
- Viva l'Italia (1961)
- Vanina Vanini (1961)
- Ro.Go.Pa.G. (1963)
- Texas, addio (1966)
- La presa del potere da parte di Luigi XIV (1966)
- Idea di un'isola (1967)
- Atti degli apostoli, 5 episodes (1969)
- Da Gerusalemme a Damasco (1970)

=== Screenwriter ===
- L'amore a vent'anni (1962)
- Idea di un'isola (1967)
- Rice University (1971)
- Blaise Pascal (1972)
- Intervista a Salvador Allende: la forza e la ragione (1973)
- Cartesius (1974)
- Concerto per Michelangelo (1977)
- Beaubourg (1977)

== Writings ==
- In 2002 Luca Sossella ed. publishes Chat Room Roberto Rossellini, a book by Rossellini and Osvaldo Contenti
- In 2007 Liguori Editore publishes Dal neorealismo alla diffusione della conoscenza, by Rossellini and Pasquale Faccio
- In 2007 Donzelli Editore publishes Impariamo a conoscere il mondo mussulmano, By Rossellini
