= 1945 New York Film Critics Circle Awards =

11th New York Film Critics Circle Awards

11th New York Film Critics Circle Awards

January 20, 1946
(announced January 1, 1946)

The Lost Weekend

The 11th New York Film Critics Circle Awards, announced on 1 January 1946, honored the best filmmaking of 1945.

== Winners ==
- Best Film:
  - The Lost Weekend
- Best Actor:
  - Ray Milland - The Lost Weekend
- Best Actress:
  - Ingrid Bergman - Spellbound and The Bells of St. Mary's
- Best Director:
  - Billy Wilder - The Lost Weekend
- Special Awards:
  - The Fighting Lady
  - The True Glory
