= Petter Lindström =

Swedish-American neurosurgeon (1907–2000)

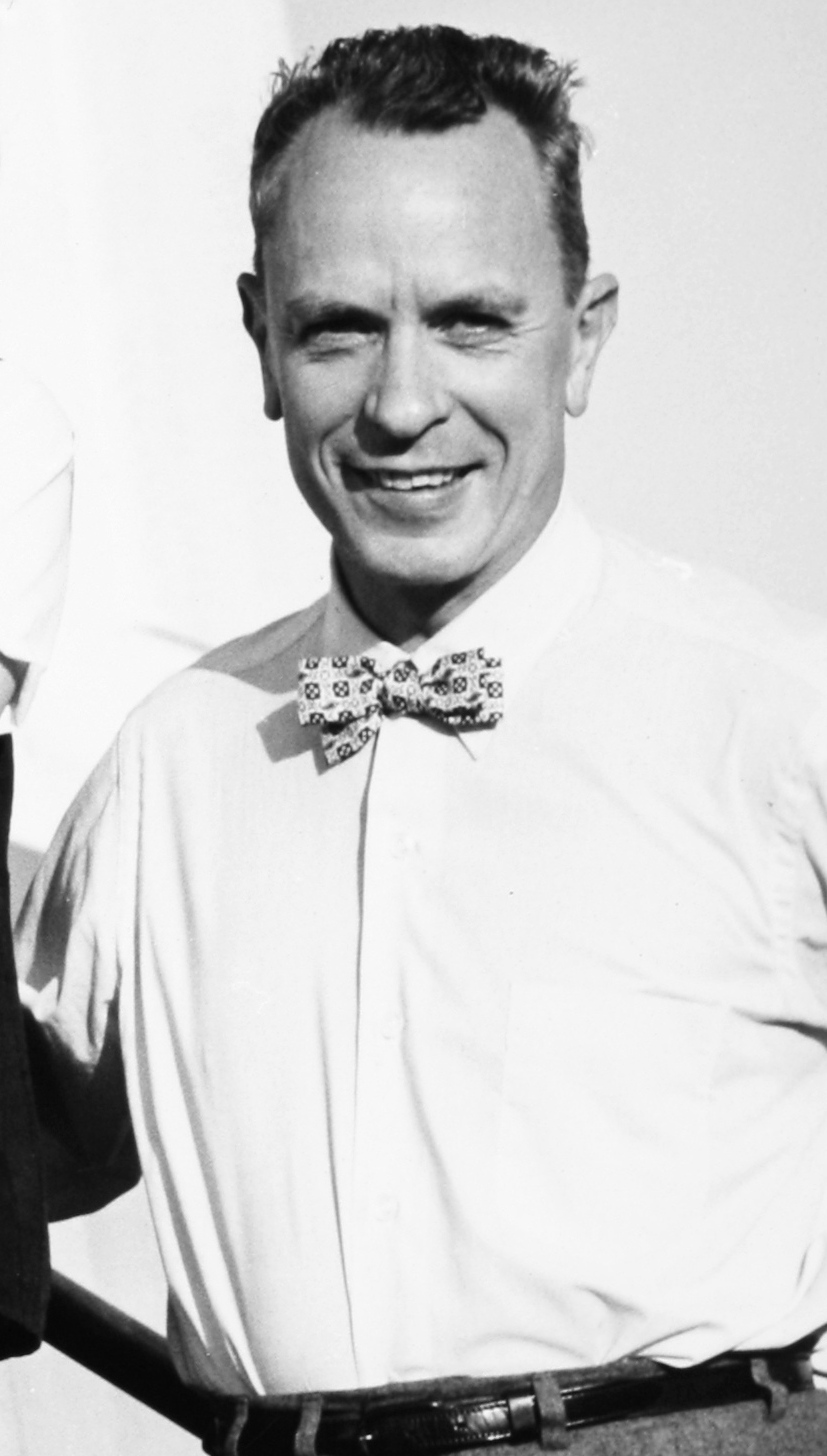
- Lindström in the 1950's
- Born: March 1, 1907; Stöde, Sundsvall Municipality, Sweden
- Died: May 24, 2000 (aged 93); Sonoma, California, USA
- Citizenship: Sweden; United States
- Occupation: Neurosurgeon
- Known for: First husband of actress Ingrid Bergman
- Spouses: Ingrid Bergman (m. 1937; div. 1950); Agnes Ronavec (m. 1953)
- Children: 5, including Pia Lindström

Petter Lindström (March 1, 1907 – May 24, 2000) was a Swedish-American neurosurgeon. He was the first husband of actress Ingrid Bergman. Their marriage ended in divorce due to her affair with filmmaker Roberto Rossellini.

== Biography ==
Lindström was born in Stöde. He earned dental and medical degrees at Heidelberg University and Leipzig University.

In 1933, Lindström met Bergman in Stockholm. They married in 1937, and had a daughter Pia. In 1943, he moved to the United States, where he studied for a medical degree from the University of Rochester. He eventually became a U.S. citizen.

In 1950, Lindström's marriage to Bergman ended in divorce due to her bearing Rossellini's son, Roberto.

In 1954, Lindström married Agnes Ronavec and they had four children: Karl, Peter, Michael and Brita.

Lindström taught neurosurgery at the University of California, Los Angeles. He also taught medicine at the University of Pittsburgh and the University of Utah. From 1955 to 1964 he was Chief of Neurosurgery at the Veterans Administration Hospital in Salt Lake City, and from 1964 to 1978 he held his own practice in San Francisco.

In the 1950's Lindstrom developed a technique for using ultrasonic energy in neurosurgery, hoping to gain the effects of prefrontal lobotomy without cutting into the head. This was a conceptual innovation but the treatment lacked necessary precision and selective targeting.

Lindström died on May 24, 2000, at the age of 93 in Sonoma, California.
