= Roberto Rossellini =

Italian film director (1906–1977)

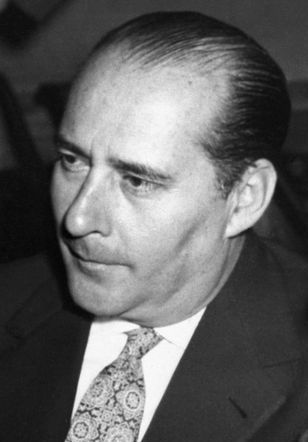
- Rossellini in 1951
- Born: Roberto Gastone Zeffiro Rossellini; 8 May 1906; Rome, Kingdom of Italy
- Died: 3 June 1977 (aged 71); Rome, Italy
- Occupations: Film director; producer; screenwriter
- Years active: 1936–1977
- Spouses: Assia Noris (m. 1934; ann. 1936) Marcella De Marchis (m. 1936; div. 1950) Ingrid Bergman (m. 1950; div. 1957) Sonali Senroy Das Gupta (m. 1957; sep. 1973)
- Children: 7, including Renzo, Isotta Ingrid and Isabella Rossellini

Roberto Gastone Zeffiro Rossellini (8 May 1906 – 3 June 1977) was an Italian film director, screenwriter and producer. He was one of the most prominent directors of the Italian neorealist cinema, contributing to the movement with films such as Rome, Open City (1945), Paisan (1946), and Germany, Year Zero (1948). He is also known for his films starring his then wife Ingrid Bergman, Stromboli (1950), Europe '51 (1952), Journey to Italy (1954), Fear (1954) and Joan of Arc at the Stake (1954).

== Early life ==
Rossellini was born in Rome. His mother, Elettra (née Bellan), was a housewife born in Rovigo, Veneto, and his father, Angiolo Giuseppe "Peppino" Rossellini, who owned a construction firm, was born in Rome from a family originally from Pisa, Tuscany. He lived on the Via Ludovisi, where Benito Mussolini had his first Roman hotel in 1922 when Fascism obtained power in Italy.

Rossellini's father built the first modern cinema in Rome, the Corso, granting his son an unlimited free pass; the cinema opened in 1918, and the young Rossellini started frequenting the cinema regularly at an early age. When his father died, he worked in film sound-making and for a certain time, he experienced all the ancillary jobs related to the creation of a film, gaining competence in each field. Rossellini had a younger brother, Renzo, who later scored many of his films.

Although he was not personally religious, he had a strong interest in Christian values in the contemporary world; he appreciated Catholic ethics and religious sentiment—things which he saw as being neglected in the materialist world.

== Career ==
In 1937, Rossellini shot his first film, Prélude à l'après-midi d'un faune, which was possibly unreleased and later lost. After this film, he was called to work as assistant director on Goffredo Alessandrini's in making Luciano Serra pilota, one of the most successful Italian films of the first half of the 20th century, and later worked on Francesco De Robertis's 1940 film Uomini sul Fondo. His close friendship with Vittorio Mussolini, son of Benito Mussolini, has been interpreted as a possible reason for having been preferred to other apprentices.

Some writers have described the first part of his career as a sequence of trilogies. His first feature film, The White Ship (1941) was sponsored by the audiovisual propaganda centre of Navy Department and is the first work in Rossellini's "Fascist Trilogy", together with A Pilot Returns (1942) and The Man with a Cross (1943). During this period he developed relationships with Federico Fellini and Aldo Fabrizi. The Fascist regime collapsed in 1943, and two months after the liberation of Rome (4 June 1944), Rossellini began preparing the anti-fascist Roma città aperta (Rome, Open City, 1945), with Fellini assisting on the script. Fabrizi played the role of the priest, while Rossellini self-produced, filming commencing in January 1945. Most of the money came from credits and loans, and film had to be found on the black market. This dramatic film was an immediate success. It has been called the first film of the Neorealist Trilogy, the second title of which was Paisà (1946), produced with non-professional actors, and the third, Germany, Year Zero (1948), was sponsored by a French producer and filmed in Berlin's French sector. In Berlin also, Rossellini preferred non-actors, but he was unable to find a face he found "interesting"; he placed his camera in the centre of a town square, as he did for Paisà, but was surprised when nobody came to watch.

As he declared in an interview "in order to really create the character that one has in mind, it is necessary for the director to engage in a battle with his actor which usually ends with submitting to the actor's wish. Since I do not have the desire to waste my energy in a battle like this, I only use professional actors occasionally". One of the reasons for success is supposed to be Rossellini's rewriting of the scripts according to the non-professional actors' feelings and histories. Regional accent, dialect and costumes were shown in the film as they were in real life.

After his Neorealist Trilogy, Rossellini produced two films now classified as the 'Transitional films': L'Amore (1948) (with Anna Magnani) and La macchina ammazzacattivi (1952), on the capability of cinema to portray reality and truth (with recalls of commedia dell'arte). In 1948, Rossellini received a letter from a famous foreign actress proposing a collaboration:

Dear Mr. Rossellini,

I saw your films Open City and Paisan, and enjoyed them very much. If you need a Swedish actress who speaks English very well, who has not forgotten her German, who is not very understandable in French, and who in Italian knows only "ti amo," I am ready to come and make a film with you.

Ingrid Bergman

With this letter began one of the best-known love stories in film history, with Bergman and Rossellini both at the peak of their careers. Their first collaboration was Stromboli terra di Dio (1950) (in the island of Stromboli, and its volcano quite conveniently erupted during filming). This affair caused a great scandal in some countries (Bergman and Rossellini were married to other people); the scandal intensified when Bergman became pregnant with Renato Roberto Ranaldo Giusto Giuseppe ("Robin") Rossellini. Rossellini and Bergman had two more children, Isabella Rossellini (actress & model) and her twin, Isotta Ingrid. Europa '51 (1952), Siamo Donne (1953), Journey to Italy (1954), La paura (1954) and Giovanna d'Arco al rogo (1954) were the other films on which they worked together.

In 1957, Jawaharlal Nehru, the prime minister of India at the time, invited him to India to make the documentary India and put some life into the floundering Indian Films Division. Though married to Bergman, he had an affair with Sonali Senroy Dasgupta, a screenwriter, herself married to local filmmaker Harisadhan Dasgupta, who was helping develop vignettes for the film. Given the climate of the 1950s, this led to a huge scandal in India as well as in Hollywood. Nehru had to ask Rossellini to leave. Soon after, Bergman and Rossellini separated.

In 1971, Rice University in Houston, Texas, invited Rossellini to help establish a Media Center, where in 1970 he had begun planning a film on science with Rice professor Donald D. Clayton. They worked daily for two weeks in Rome in summer 1970, but financing was insufficient for filming to begin. In 1973, he was invited to teach at Yale University in New Haven, Connecticut, where he taught a one-semester course titled "The Essential Image."

Rossellini's final project was the documentary Beaubourg, filmed in 1977 and first premiered in 1983.

== Personal life ==
In 1934, Rossellini married Assia Noris, a Russian actress who worked in Italian films; the marriage was annulled in 1936. On 26 September 1936, he married Marcella De Marchis (17 January 1916, Rome – 25 February 2009, Sarteano), a costume designer with whom he collaborated even after their marriage was over. De Marchis and Rossellini had two sons: Marco Romano (born 3 July 1937 and died of appendicitis in 1946), and Renzo (born 24 August 1941). Rossellini and De Marchis divorced in 1950.

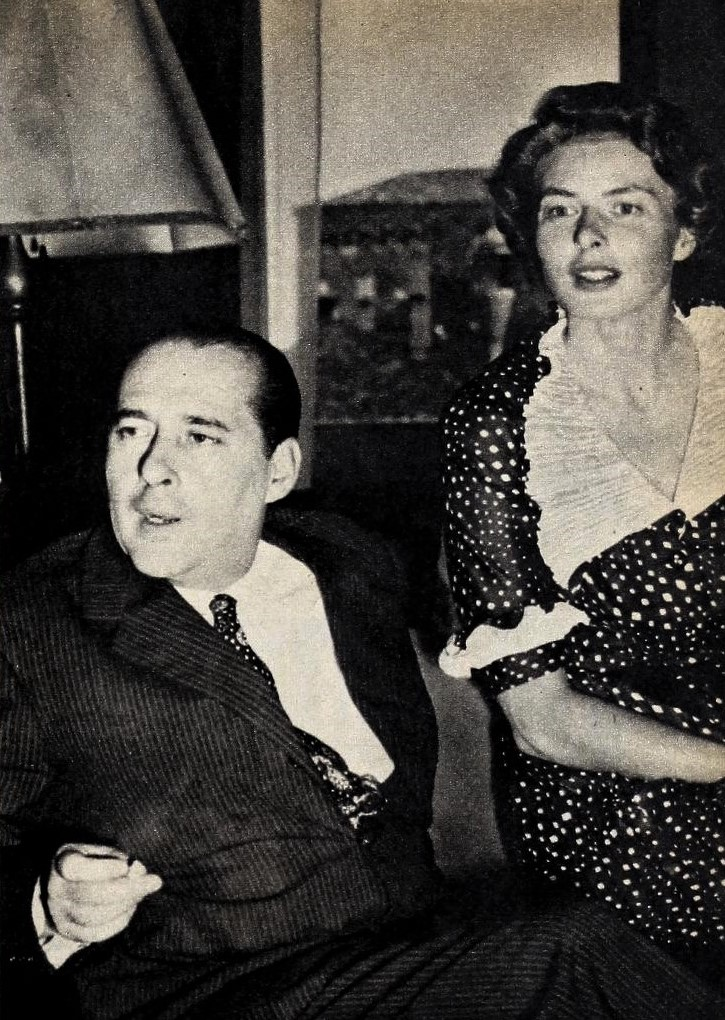
Rossellini and Bergman in Photoplay magazine, January 1953. Bergman's pregnancy was a scandal that rocked Hollywood

While filming Stromboli, Rossellini had an affair with Ingrid Bergman (who was at the time married to Petter Lindström) in 1949. In the same month the film was released, Bergman gave birth to a boy, Renato Roberto Ranaldo Giusto Giuseppe ("Robin") Rossellini (born 2 February 1950). A week after their son was born, Bergman divorced Lindström and married Rossellini in Mexico. On 18 June 1952, she gave birth to their twin daughters Isotta Ingrid Rossellini and Isabella Rossellini.

In 1957, Rossellini had an affair with Bengali screenwriter Sonali Dasgupta (née Senroy), and soon after, Bergman and Rossellini separated. Rossellini eloped with Dasgupta in 1957 when she was 27 years old. He adopted her young son Arjun, renamed Gil Rossellini (23 October 1956 – 3 October 2008), who became a New York-based film producer. Rossellini and Dasgupta had a daughter together, Raffaella Rossellini (born 1958), who is an actress and model.

In 1973, Rossellini left Dasgupta for producer Silvia D'Amico Bendicò, but he remained married to Dasgupta until his death of a heart attack at age 71 in 1977.

Along with Albert Einstein, Rossellini was one of the sponsors of the Peoples' World Convention (PWC), also known as Peoples' World Constituent Assembly (PWCA), which took place in 1950–51 at Palais Electoral, Geneva, Switzerland.

== Legacy ==
Rossellini's films after his early Neo-Realist films—particularly his films with Ingrid Bergman—were commercially unsuccessful, though Journey to Italy is well regarded in some quarters. He was an acknowledged master for the critics of Cahiers du Cinéma in general and André Bazin, François Truffaut, and Jean-Luc Godard in particular. Truffaut noted in his 1963 essay, Roberto Rossellini Prefers Real Life (available in The Films in My Life) that Rossellini's influence among the directors who became part of the nouvelle vague was so great that he was in every sense "the father of the French New Wave".

His posthumous ex-son-in-law Martin Scorsese has acknowledged Rossellini's seminal influence in his documentary My Voyage to Italy (the title itself a take on Rossellini's Voyage to Italy). Among works from Italian directors Fellini, Visconti, De Sica and Antonioni, Rossellini's films form at least half of the films Scorsese discusses, highlighting Rossellini's monumental role in Italian and world cinema. The films covered include his Neo-Realist films and films with Ingrid Bergman, as well as The Flowers of St. Francis, about St. Francis of Assisi. Scorsese notes that in contrast to directors who often become stylistically restrained and conservative as their careers advanced, Rossellini became more unconventional as his career advanced, and was constantly experimenting with new styles and technical challenges. Scorsese particularly highlights the series of biographies Rossellini made in the 60s of historical figures and singles out La Prise de pouvoir par Louis XIV for praise.

Certain of Rossellini's film-related material and personal papers are contained in the Wesleyan University Cinema Archives to which scholars and media experts from around the world may have full access. Rossellini's son Renzo is producing the Audiovisual Encyclopedia of History by Roberto Rossellini, a multi-media collection containing all of Rossellini's works, interviews, and other material from the Rossellini archive. The Encyclopedia existed in prototype form in 2011.

== Filmography ==
=== Feature films ===
Year	English title	Original title	Notes
1941	The White Ship	La nave bianca	Fascist Trilogy
1942	A Pilot Returns	Un pilota ritorna	Fascist Trilogy
1943	The Man with a Cross	L'uomo dalla croce	Fascist Trilogy
1945	Rome, Open City	Roma città aperta	Neorealist Trilogy
1946	Desire	Desiderio	Co-directed with Marcello Pagliero
1946	Paisan	Paisà	Neorealist Trilogy
1948	L'amore		
1948	Germany, Year Zero	Germania anno zero	Neorealist Trilogy
1950	Stromboli	Stromboli terra di Dio	1st collaboration with Ingrid Bergman
1950	The Flowers of St. Francis	Francesco, giullare di Dio	
1952	The Machine to Kill Bad People	La Macchina ammazzacattivi	
1952	Europe '51	Europa '51	
1954	Where Is Freedom?	Dov'è la libertà...?	Abandoned, completed by studio
1954	Journey to Italy	Viaggio in Italia	
1954	Fear	La Paura	
1954	Joan of Arc at the Stake	Giovanna d'Arco al rogo	Last collaboration with Ingrid Bergman
1959	India: Matri Bhumi		Documentary
1959	General Della Rovere	Il generale Della Rovere	
1960	Escape by Night	Era Notte a Roma	
1961	Garibaldi	Viva l'Italia!	
1961	Vanina Vanini		
1962	Black Soul	Anima nera	
1970	Da Gerusalemme a Damasco		
1974	Year One	Anno uno	
1975	The Messiah	Il messia	
1977	Beaubourg, centre d'art et de culture Georges Pompidou		Documentary

=== Short films ===
Year	English title	Original title
1939	Lively Teresa	La Vispa Teresa
1939	Il Tacchino prepotente	
1940	Fantasia sottomarina	
1941	Il Ruscello di Ripasottile	
1952	Envy (segment of The Seven Deadly Sins)	Envie
1953	Ingrid Bergman (segment from We, the Women)	Siamo donne
1954	Napoli 1943 (segment from Mid-Century Loves)	Naples 1943
1963	Illibatezza (segment from Ro.Go.Pa.G.)	

=== Other credits ===
- Prélude à l'après-midi d'un faune (1937) - lost project
- Luciano Serra, Pilot (1938) screenplay
- L'Invasore (1949) - supervisor
- Rivalità (1953) - supervisor
- Benito Mussolini (1962) - producer
- Les Carabiniers (1963) - co-screenwriter
- The Night of Counting the Years (1969) - producer
- Intervista a Salvador Allende: La forza e la ragione (1971) - interviewer

== Television ==
Rossellini was an enthusiastic creator of television films. Following the critical failure of Anima nera and his participation in the various artists film Ro.Go.Pa.G., Rossellini began directing films for TV in 1966 with La Prise de pouvoir par Louis XIV, and continued predominately in the medium until the end of his career in 1977.

=== TV films ===
- The Taking of Power by Louis XIV (1966)
- Idea di un'isola (1967)
- Socrates (The Philosophers, 1971)
- Rice University (1971) - with Beppe Cino
- Pascal (The Philosophers, 1972)
- Agostino d'Ippona (The Philosophers, 1972)
- Cartesius (The Philosophers, 1974)
- The World Population (1974) - with Renzo Rossellini
- Concerto per Michelangelo (1977)

=== TV series ===
- L'India vista da Rossellini (1959) - director, mini-series
- L'Età del ferro (1964) - director, mini-series
- Atti degli apostoli (1969) - director, mini-series
- La lotta dell'uomo per la sua sopravvivenza (1970) - writer
- L'Età di Cosimo de' Medici (1973) - director, mini-series

Some sources associate Rossellini with the 1961 Torino nei cent'anni, but the status and completion of the project is unconfirmed.
