= Back to the Future =

1985 film by Robert Zemeckis

- Theatrical release poster by Drew Struzan
- Directed by: Robert Zemeckis
- Written by: Robert Zemeckis; Bob Gale
- Produced by: Bob Gale; Neil Canton
- Starring: Michael J. Fox; Christopher Lloyd; Lea Thompson; Crispin Glover
- Cinematography: Dean Cundey
- Edited by: Arthur Schmidt; Harry Keramidas
- Music by: Alan Silvestri
- Production company: Amblin Entertainment
- Distributed by: Universal Pictures
- Release date: July 3, 1985
- Running time: 116 minutes
- Country: United States
- Language: English
- Budget: $19 million
- Box office: $393–398.2 million

Back to the Future is a 1985 American science fiction film directed by Robert Zemeckis and written by Zemeckis and Bob Gale. It stars Michael J. Fox, Christopher Lloyd, Lea Thompson, Crispin Glover, and Thomas F. Wilson. Set in 1985, it follows Marty McFly (Fox), a teenager accidentally sent back to 1955 in a time-traveling DeLorean automobile built by his eccentric scientist friend Emmett "Doc" Brown (Lloyd), where he inadvertently prevents his future parents from falling in love – threatening his own existence – and is forced to reconcile them and somehow get back to the future.

Gale and Zemeckis conceived the idea for Back to the Future in 1980. They were desperate for a successful film after numerous collaborative failures, but the project was rejected more than forty times by various studios because it was not considered raunchy enough to compete with the successful comedies of the era. A development deal was secured with Universal Pictures following Zemeckis's success directing Romancing the Stone (1984). Fox was the first choice to portray Marty but was unavailable; Eric Stoltz was cast instead. Shortly after principal photography began in November 1984, Zemeckis determined Stoltz was not right for the part and made the concessions necessary to hire Fox, including re-filming scenes already shot with Stoltz and adding $4 million to the budget. Back to the Future was filmed in and around California and on sets at Universal Studios, and concluded the following April.

After highly successful test screenings, the release date was brought forward to July 3, 1985, giving the film more time in theaters during the busiest period of the theatrical year. The change resulted in a rushed post-production schedule and some incomplete special effects. Nevertheless, Back to the Future was a critical and commercial success, earning $381.1 million to become the highest-grossing film of 1985 worldwide. Critics praised the story, humor, and the cast, particularly Fox, Lloyd, Thompson, and Glover. It received multiple award nominations and won an Academy Award, three Saturn Awards, and a Hugo Award. Its theme song, "The Power of Love" by Huey Lewis and the News, was also a success.

Back to the Future has since grown in esteem and is now considered by critics and audiences to be one of the greatest science fiction films and among the best films ever made. In 2007, the United States Library of Congress selected it for preservation in the National Film Registry. The film was followed by two sequels, Back to the Future Part II (1989) and Back to the Future Part III (1990). Spurred by the film's dedicated fan following and effect on popular culture, Universal Studios launched a multimedia franchise, which now includes video games, theme park rides, an animated television series, and a stage musical. Its enduring popularity has prompted numerous books about its production, documentaries, and commercials.

== Plot ==
In 1985, teenager Marty McFly lives in Hill Valley, California, with his depressed alcoholic mother, Lorraine; his older siblings, who are professional and social failures; and his meek father, George, who is bullied by his supervisor, Biff Tannen. After Marty's band fails a music audition, he confides in his girlfriend, Jennifer Parker, that he fears becoming like his parents despite his ambitions.

That night, Marty meets his eccentric scientist friend, Emmett "Doc" Brown, in the Twin Pines mall parking lot. Doc unveils a time machine built from a modified DeLorean, powered by plutonium he swindled from Libyan terrorists. After Doc inputs a destination time of November 5, 1955 (the day he conceived his time travel invention), the terrorists arrive unexpectedly and gun him down. Marty flees in the DeLorean, inadvertently activating time travel when reaching 88 miles per hour (142 kilometers per hour).

Arriving in 1955, Marty discovers he has no plutonium, so he cannot return to 1985. While exploring a burgeoning Hill Valley, Marty encounters his teenage father, discovering Biff was bullying George even then. George falls into the path of an oncoming car while spying on the teenage Lorraine changing clothes, and Marty is knocked unconscious while saving him. He wakes to find himself tended to by Lorraine, who becomes infatuated with him. Marty tracks down and convinces a younger Doc that he is from the future. Doc explains the only source available in 1955 capable of generating the 1.21 gigawatts of power required for time travel is a lightning bolt. Marty shows Doc a flyer from the future that documents an upcoming lightning strike at the town's courthouse. As Marty's siblings begin to fade from a photo he carries with him, Doc realizes Marty's actions are altering the future and jeopardizing his existence: Lorraine was supposed to tend to George instead of Marty after the car accident. Early attempts to get his parents acquainted fail, Marty gains the animosity of Biff, and Lorraine's infatuation with Marty deepens.

Lorraine asks Marty to the school dance, and he plots to feign inappropriate advances on her, allowing George to intervene and rescue her, but the plan goes awry when Biff's gang locks Marty in the trunk of the performing band's car, while Biff forces himself onto Lorraine. George arrives expecting to find Marty but is assaulted by Biff. After Biff hurts Lorraine, an enraged George knocks him unconscious and escorts the grateful Lorraine to the dance. The band frees Marty from their car, but the lead guitarist injures his hand in the process, so Marty takes his place, performing while George and Lorraine share their first kiss. With his future no longer in jeopardy, Marty hurries to the courthouse to meet Doc.

Doc discovers a letter from Marty warning him about his future and rips it up, worried about the consequences. To save Doc, Marty recalibrates the DeLorean to return ten minutes before he had left the future. The lightning strikes, sending Marty back to 1985, but the DeLorean breaks down, forcing Marty to run back to the mall. He arrives as Doc is being shot. While Marty grieves at his side, Doc sits up, revealing he had pieced Marty's note back together and is wearing a bulletproof vest. He takes Marty home and departs to 2015 in the DeLorean. Marty wakes the next morning, discovering his father is now a confident and successful science fiction author, his mother is fit and happy, his siblings are successful, and Biff is a servile valet in George's employ. As Marty reunites with Jennifer, Doc suddenly reappears in the DeLorean, insisting they return with him to the future to help their children. (Note: As depicted in Back to the Future Part II (1989))

== Cast ==
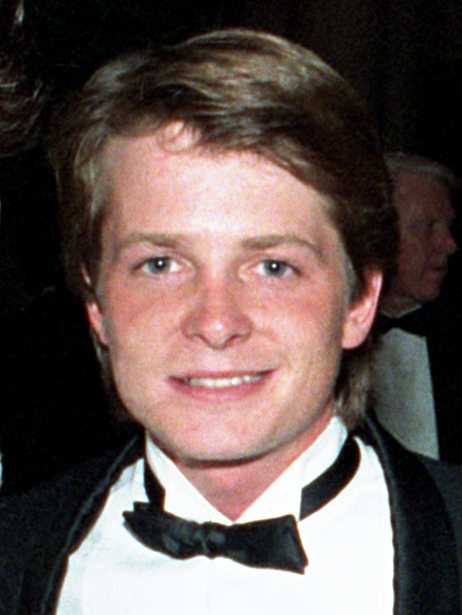
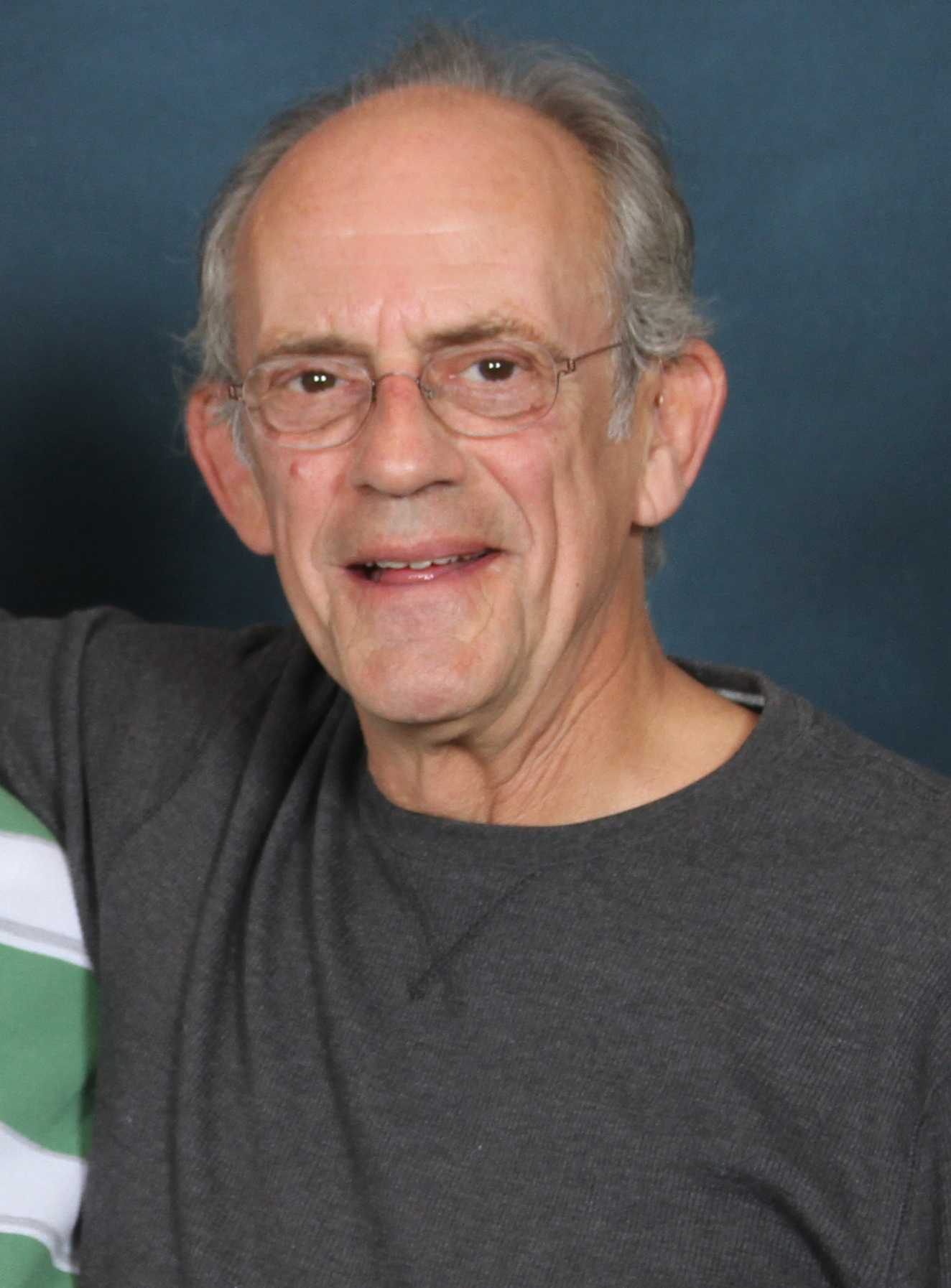
Michael J. Fox in 1985 (left) and Christopher Lloyd in 2010
- Michael J. Fox as Marty McFly, a high school student and aspiring musician
- Christopher Lloyd as Emmett "Doc" Brown, an eccentric scientist experimenting with time travel
- Lea Thompson as Lorraine Baines McFly, a 1955 teenager who grows into Marty's unhappy, alcoholic mother
- Crispin Glover as George McFly, a nerdy 1955 high schooler who grows into Marty's cowardly, submissive father
- Thomas F. Wilson as Biff Tannen, a 1955 high school bully turned George's 1985 boss

The 1985 portion of the film features a cast including Claudia Wells as Marty's girlfriend Jennifer Parker, and Marc McClure and Wendie Jo Sperber as Marty's siblings Dave McFly and Linda McFly. Elsa Raven plays the Clocktower Lady. Singer Huey Lewis has a cameo role as a judge for the Battle of the Bands contest. Richard L. Duran and Jeff O'Haco portray the Libyan terrorists.

Cast appearing in the 1955 portion includes George DiCenzo and Frances Lee McCain as Lorraine's parents, Sam and Stella Baines, and Jason Hervey as Lorraine's younger brother Milton. Biff's gang includes Jeffrey Jay Cohen as Skinhead, Casey Siemaszko as 3-D, and Billy Zane as Match. Norman Alden plays cafe owner Lou, and Donald Fullilove appears as his employee (and future mayor) Goldie Wilson. Harry Waters Jr. portrays Chuck Berry's cousin Marvin Berry; Will Hare appears as Pa Peabody; and Courtney Gains portrays Dixon, the youth who interrupts George's and Lorraine's dance. James Tolkan portrays Hill Valley high school principal Strickland in both 1955 and 1985.

== Production ==
=== Conception and writing ===
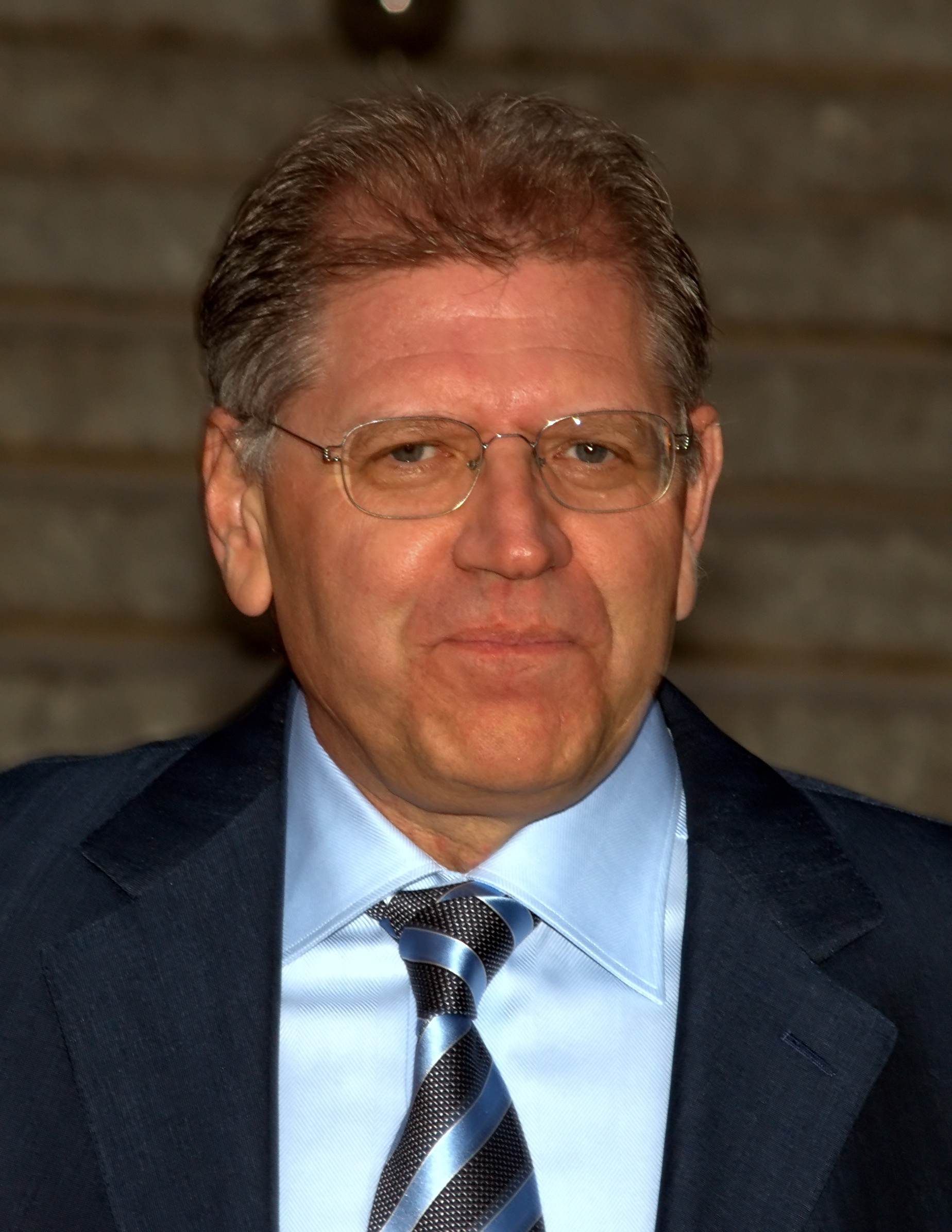
Director Robert Zemeckis in 2010, who developed Back to the Future with his long-time friend Bob Gale

Long-time collaborators Bob Gale and Robert Zemeckis conceived Back to the Future in 1980. They wanted to develop a film about time travel but struggled to create a satisfying narrative, and were desperate for a successful project after the critical or commercial failures of their recent efforts in collaboration with Zemeckis's mentor, Steven Spielberg.

Following the release of their comedy Used Cars (1980), Gale visited his parents and came across his father's high school yearbook. He wondered if he and his father would have been friends had they attended school together. He did not think so, but realized he could test his theory if he could travel back to a time when he and his parents were a similar age. He shared the idea with Zemeckis, who recalled his mother's childhood stories were often contradictory.

Gale and Zemeckis began a draft in late 1980. They sketched and acted out each scene to help develop the dialogue and actions. They believed many time-travel films focused on the past being immutable and wanted to show the past being altered and the effect those changes would have on the future. In the draft, video pirate Professor Brown builds a time machine that sends his young friend Marty back to the 1950s where he interrupts his parents' first meeting. In September 1980, Gale and Zemeckis pitched their idea to Columbia Pictures president Frank Price, who had liked Used Cars and was keen to work with the pair. Gale recalled having to rein in Zemeckis's enthusiastic pitch before Price had time to change his mind. Gale and Zemeckis completed the first draft for Price on February 21, 1981, but Price believed it needed significant refinement.

Some early concepts were abandoned. Originally, Marty's actions in 1955 had a more significant impact on the future, making 1985 more futuristic and advanced, but every person who read the script took issue with the idea. Marty's father also became a boxer, a result of his knockout punch on Biff. The time machine was a stationary object moved around on the back of a truck. Inspired by the documentary The Atomic Cafe, the drained time machine was written to be powered by Marty driving it into a nuclear explosion, combined with an additional ingredient: Coca-Cola. (Note: Attributed to multiple references:) Gale and Zemeckis took inspiration from tales of legendary scientists, opting to make the time machine's creator an individual instead of a faceless corporation or government. The pair wanted the inciting time-travel incident to be an accident so that it would not appear that the hero was seeking personal gain.

Gale and Zemeckis drew humor from the cultural contrasts between 1955 and 1985, such as Marty entering a 1955 soda shop in 1985 clothing; the shop owner asks Marty if he is a sailor because his down vest resembles a life preserver. They also identified conveniences of 1985 that Marty had taken for granted, but would be denied in 1955. Gale and Zemeckis struggled with the writing, as they were in their 30s and did not particularly identify with either era. They were inspired by the All-American aesthetic of films by Frank Capra featuring white picket fences and exaggerated characters similar to Biff, The Twilight Zone, science fiction films, and books by Robert Silverberg and Robert Heinlein. The romantic relationship between 1955 Lorraine and her future son was one of the more difficult writing challenges. Gale and Zemeckis attempted to take the concept as far as possible to keep the audience on edge. They believed it had to be Lorraine who stopped the relationship; she remarks that kissing Marty feels like kissing her brother. Gale jokingly said no one asked how she could make that comparison, but that audiences would accept it because they did not want the relationship to happen. The second draft was completed by April 7, 1981.

=== Development ===
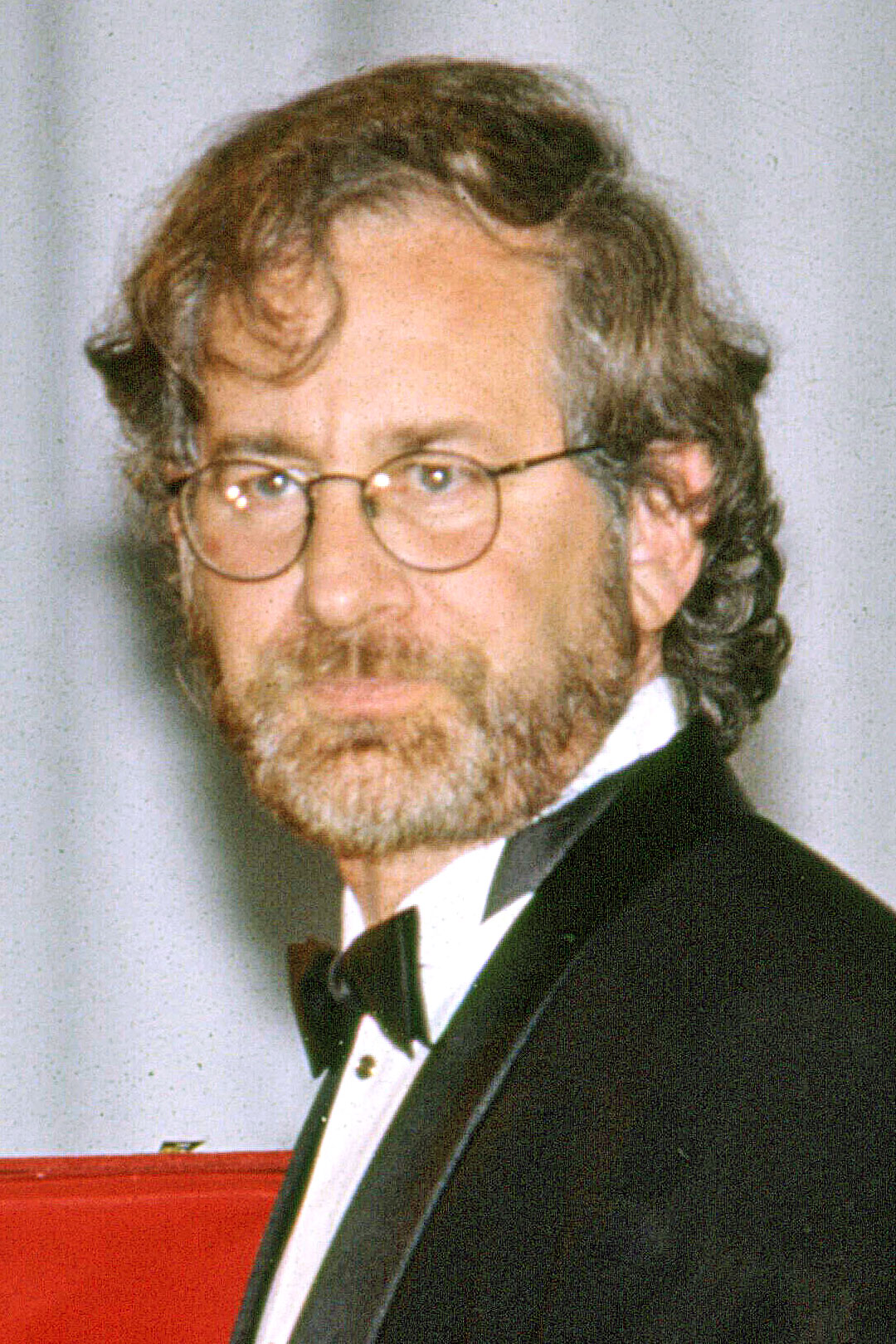
Steven Spielberg in 1993. He mentored Zemeckis and lent his experience and Hollywood studio clout to support the production of Back to the Future.

Price opted not to green-light the second draft; although he liked it, he did not believe it would appeal to anyone else. The most successful comedies at the time, such as Animal House (1978), Porky's (1981), and Fast Times at Ridgemont High (1982), featured sexual and bawdy elements; Back to the Future was considered too tame in comparison. Columbia put the project into turnaround (a process allowing other studios to purchase the idea). The script was rejected some forty times, sometimes multiple times by the same studios. Reasons given included the concept being unappealing to contemporary rebellious youth and the failures of other time travel films, such as The Final Countdown (1980) and Time Bandits (1981). Walt Disney Productions turned it down because they considered Marty's fighting off his future mother's advances too risqué for their brand. The only supporter of the project was Spielberg, but with their previous collaborations considered relative failures, Gale and Zemeckis feared another misstep would suggest they could get work only through being friends with Spielberg.

Zemeckis accepted the next project offered to him, Romancing the Stone (1984). Against expectations, the film was a significant success and gave Zemeckis enough credibility to return to Back to the Future. (Note: Attributed to multiple references:) Zemeckis held a grudge against the studios that had rejected the project and turned to Spielberg, who had set up his own production company, Amblin Entertainment, at Universal Pictures, where Price now worked. Spielberg disliked Price because he had rejected E.T. the Extra-Terrestrial (1982) and demanded his involvement in Back to the Future be minimal. Sidney Sheinberg installed himself as chief executive to oversee the studio's investment in the project. Amblin executives Kathleen Kennedy and Frank Marshall joined Spielberg as the film's executive producers.

However, rights to Back to the Future remained with Columbia Pictures. Price's successor at Columbia, Guy McElwaine, was developing a satire of the Universal-owned noir film Double Indemnity (1944) called Big Trouble (1986). Its similarities to Double Indemnity meant the studio would violate Universal's copyright. With production imminent, McElwaine asked for the rights from Price; in exchange, Price obtained the rights to Back to the Future.

Sheinberg suggested modifications to the film, including changing the title to Space Man from Pluto, believing Back to the Future would not resonate with audiences. Gale and Zemeckis did not know how to reject Sheinberg's suggestions without risking his ire. Spielberg intervened, sending Sheinberg a memo reading: "Hi Sid, thanks for your most humorous memo, we all got a big laugh out of it, keep 'em coming." Spielberg knew Sheinberg would be too embarrassed to admit his memo was to be taken seriously. Sheinberg later claimed the story was "bullshit". Sheinberg also wanted to change the name of Marty's mother from Meg to Lorraine (a tribute to his wife Lorraine Gary), and rename Professor Brown to Doc Brown because he considered it more accessible. The third draft was completed by July 1984. The lengthy development allowed Gale and Zemeckis to refine the script's jokes, especially ones that had become dated since 1980. The joke about former actor Ronald Reagan becoming President of the United States remained following his re-election in 1984.

=== Casting ===
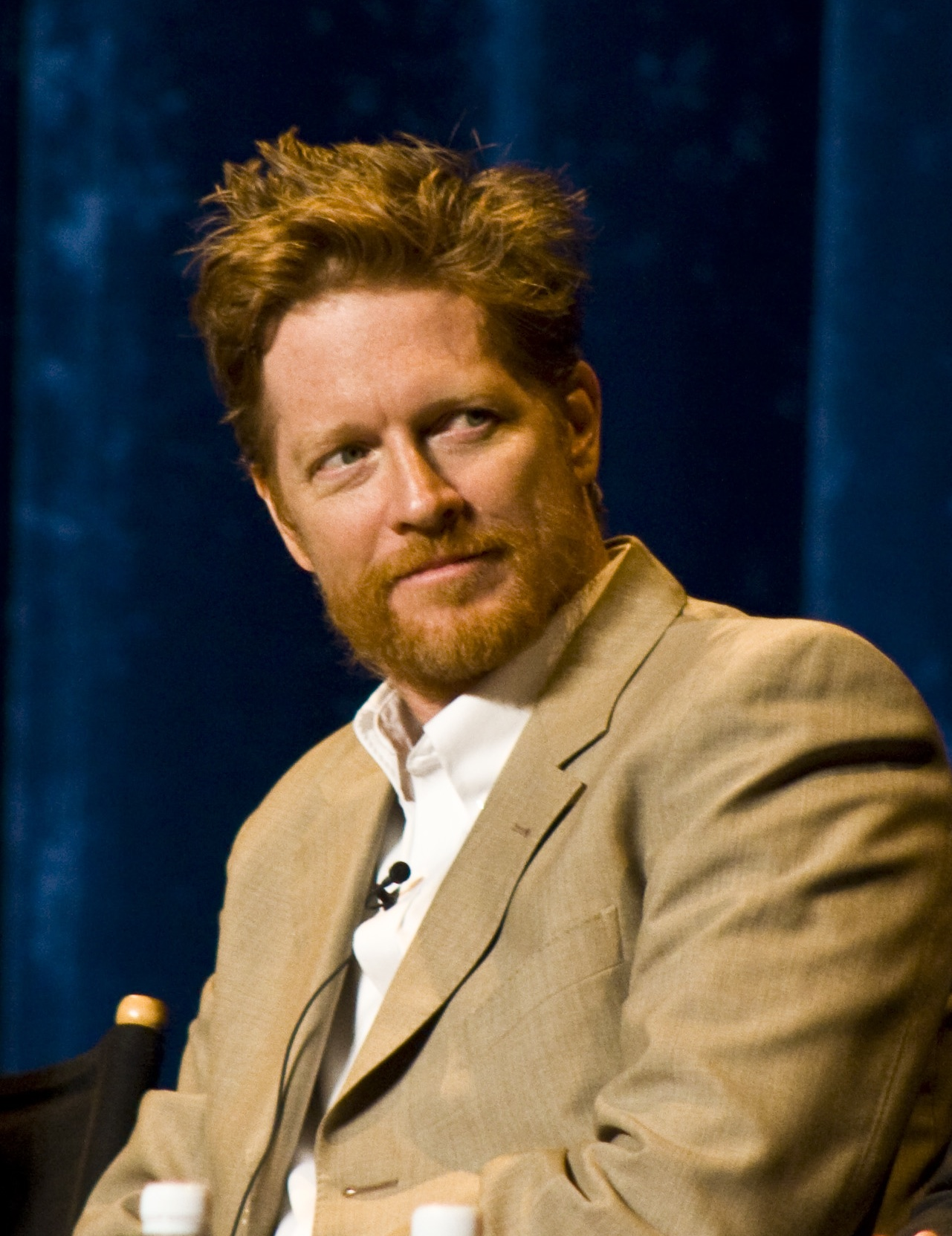
Eric Stoltz (pictured in 2009) was cast as Marty McFly and spent several weeks filming Back to the Future before the role was re-cast.

Michael J. Fox was the first choice to portray Marty McFly. Gale and Zemeckis believed his acting timing in the NBC sitcom Family Ties (1982–1989) as the sophisticated Alex P. Keaton could be translated to Marty's clumsiness. Spielberg asked the show's producer Gary David Goldberg to have Fox read the script. Concerned Fox's absence would damage Family Ties' success, especially with fellow star Meredith Baxter on maternity leave, Goldberg did not give Fox the script. Other young stars were considered, including: John Cusack, C. Thomas Howell, Johnny Depp, Ralph Macchio, Charlie Sheen, Jon Cryer, Ben Stiller, Peter DeLuise, Billy Zane, George Newbern, Robert Downey Jr., Christopher Collet, Matthew Modine, and Corey Hart (who declined to audition). (Note: Attributed to multiple references:) Howell was the frontrunner, but Sheinberg preferred Eric Stoltz, who had impressed with his portrayal of Rocky Dennis in an early screening of the drama film Mask (1985). With the filming date approaching, Zemeckis opted for Stoltz. Sheinberg promised that if Stoltz did not work out, they could reshoot the film. The character's name was derived from Used Cars production assistant Marty Casella. Zemeckis suggested McFly because it sounded "All-American".

Among others, Jeff Goldblum, John Lithgow, Dudley Moore, Ron Silver, Robin Williams, John Cleese, Mandy Patinkin, Gene Hackman, James Woods, and Mark Mothersbaugh were considered for the role of Doc Brown. (Note: Attributed to multiple references:) Producer Neil Canton suggested Lithgow, having worked with him and Christopher Lloyd on Buckaroo Banzai (1984). Lithgow was unavailable, and the role was offered to Lloyd. He was reluctant to join the production until a friend encouraged him to take the part. Albert Einstein and conductor Leopold Stokowski inspired Lloyd's wild, white hair. Lloyd affected a hunched posture to lower his 6 feet 1 inch (1.85 meters) height closer to the 5 feet 5 inches (1.65 m) tall Fox.

The filmmakers became aware of Lea Thompson while researching Stoltz in the comedy-drama The Wild Life (1984). Crispin Glover used many of his own mannerisms in portraying George McFly. Gale described his performance as "nuts", and Zemeckis was reportedly unhappy with Glover's performance choices, instructing him to be more restrained as the older George. Glover lost his voice during filming and later dubbed in some lines. According to Fox, Glover refused to follow blocking—preferring to move freely on whim regardless of camera placement—to the frustration of the crew.

DeLuise, Zane, Tim Robbins, and J. J. Cohen were considered to play Biff Tannen. Cohen was not considered intimidating enough against Stoltz, and the role went to Thomas F. Wilson, his first feature starring role. Zane and Cohen were cast as Biff's minions Match and Skinhead instead. Tannen's name was taken from Universal Studios executive Ned Tanen, who had been unpleasant with Gale and Zemeckis.

Melora Hardin was cast as Jennifer Parker on a two-film contract. After Stoltz's replacement, the crew were polled about Hardin being taller than Fox; the female crew overwhelmingly voted Marty should not be shorter than his girlfriend. Hardin was replaced by Claudia Wells, who had previously declined the role because of her commitment to the short-lived television series Off the Rack (1984). Actresses Kyra Sedgwick and Jill Schoelen were also considered; Schoelen was told she looked too "exotic" and not sufficiently All-American. Doc Brown's pet, a dog named Einstein, was originally scripted as a chimpanzee named Shemp. Sheinberg insisted films featuring chimps never did well. James Tolkan was the first choice for Principal Strickland after Zemeckis saw him in the crime drama Prince of the City (1981). Singer and soundtrack contributor Huey Lewis cameos as a Battle of the Bands judge. Lewis agreed to appear as long as he was uncredited and could wear a disguise. Gale cameos as the hand in the radiation suit tapping the DeLorean time display.

=== Filming with Stoltz ===
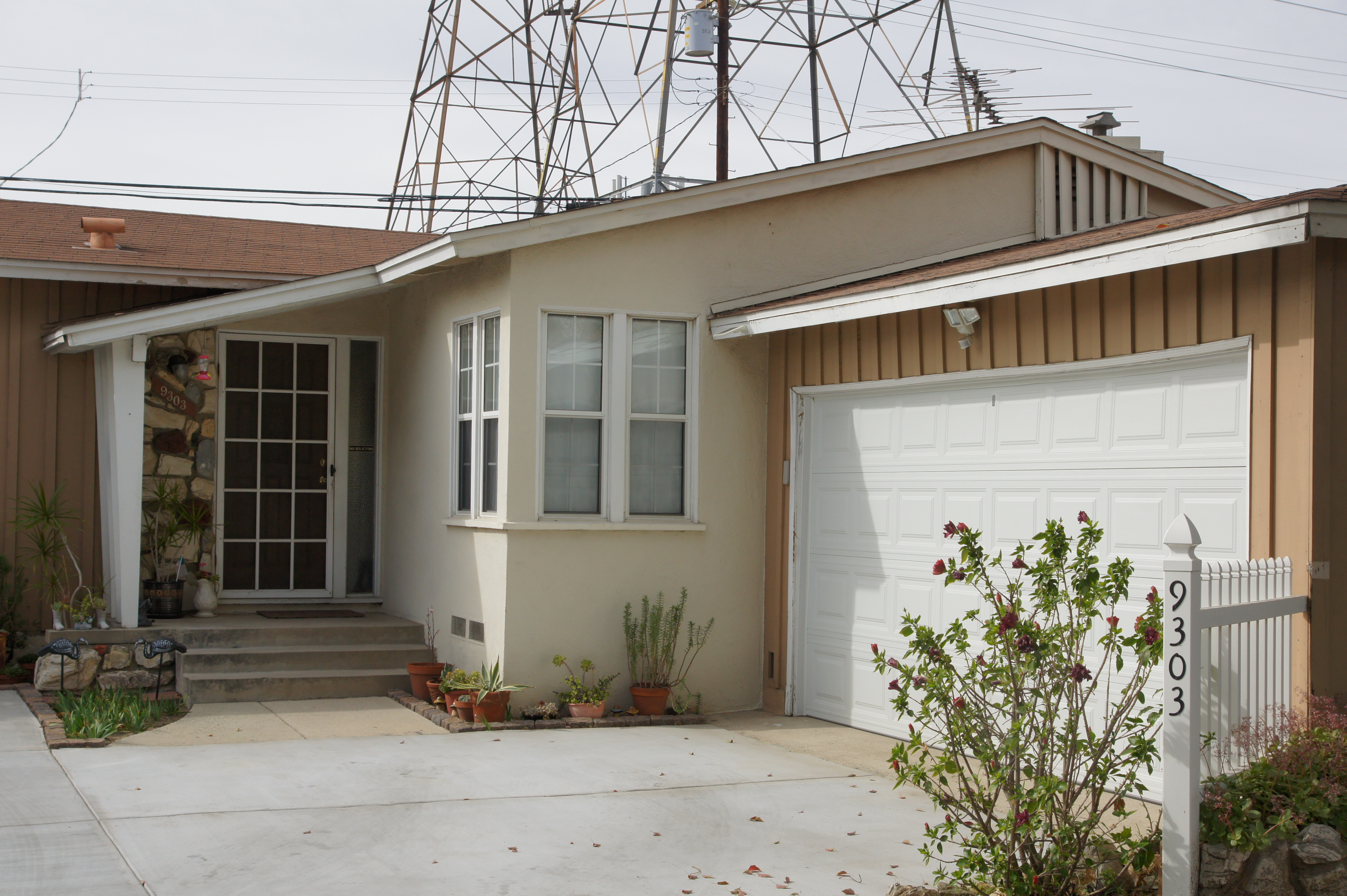
A house in Arleta, Los Angeles, served as the exterior of the McFlys' home.

Principal photography began on November 26, 1984, on a 14-week schedule set to conclude on February 28, 1985, with an estimated $14 million budget. Filming took place mainly at the Universal Studios Lot and on location in California. Dean Cundey served as the cinematographer; he and Zemeckis had collaborated on Romancing the Stone. Editor Arthur Schmidt was hired after Zemeckis saw his work on Firstborn (1984); Schmidt recommended hiring Harry Keramidas as co-editor. Frank Marshall also served as a second unit director.

Owing to the tight schedule, editing occurred concurrently with filming. On December 30, 1984, Zemeckis reviewed the existing scenes with Schmidt and Keramidas. Zemeckis was reluctant to review the footage because he would be self-critical, but he believed Stoltz's acting was not working and had already listed several scenes he wanted to reshoot. Zemeckis called in Gale and the producers to show them the footage; they agreed Stoltz was not right for the part. Stoltz was performing the role with an intense and serious tone, not the "screwball" energy they desired. Gale characterized Stoltz as a good actor in the wrong role.

Stoltz used method acting and stayed in character as Marty when not filming, refusing to answer to his own name. This resulted in feuding with some of the cast and crew, including Wilson. Stoltz put his full strength into pushing Wilson rather than imitating doing so, despite Wilson's protests. Spielberg said Zemeckis needed a replacement in place before firing Stoltz, or he risked the production being canceled. Zemeckis and the producers asked Sheinberg for permission to do whatever was necessary to accommodate Fox's participation; Spielberg made another call to Goldberg. On January 3, 1985, Goldberg told Fox about withholding the Back to the Future script from him, and the filmmakers wanted to know if he was interested. Baxter had returned to the show, and they could be more flexible with Fox as long as Family Ties took priority. Fox agreed to join without reading the script. The transition could not take place immediately and filming continued with Stoltz in the lead role, unaware he was to be replaced.

On January 10, 1985, Zemeckis informed Stoltz that he was being fired. Zemeckis described it as "the hardest meeting I've ever had in my life and it was all my fault. I broke [Stoltz's] heart." Stoltz was reported to have told his makeup artist he was not a comedian and did not understand why he was cast. The producers informed the principal cast and the rest of the crew much of the film would be re-shot. Cundey said most of the crew saw Stoltz's removal as "good news". Crew members later said there were obvious signs Stoltz would be replaced; the set designers were told not to change the 1955 set, and a scene involving a discussion between Marty and Doc was filmed showing only Doc. Stoltz had shot numerous key scenes including Marty traveling to 1955 in the DeLorean, its breaking down as he prepares to return to 1985, and his final scene was Marty's return to 1985. Filming fell behind schedule, with 34 days of filming lost and an additional cost of $3.5–$4.0 million, including Stoltz receiving his salary in full. Universal's marketing team was tasked with mitigating the negative publicity from a project replacing its main star.

=== Filming with Fox ===
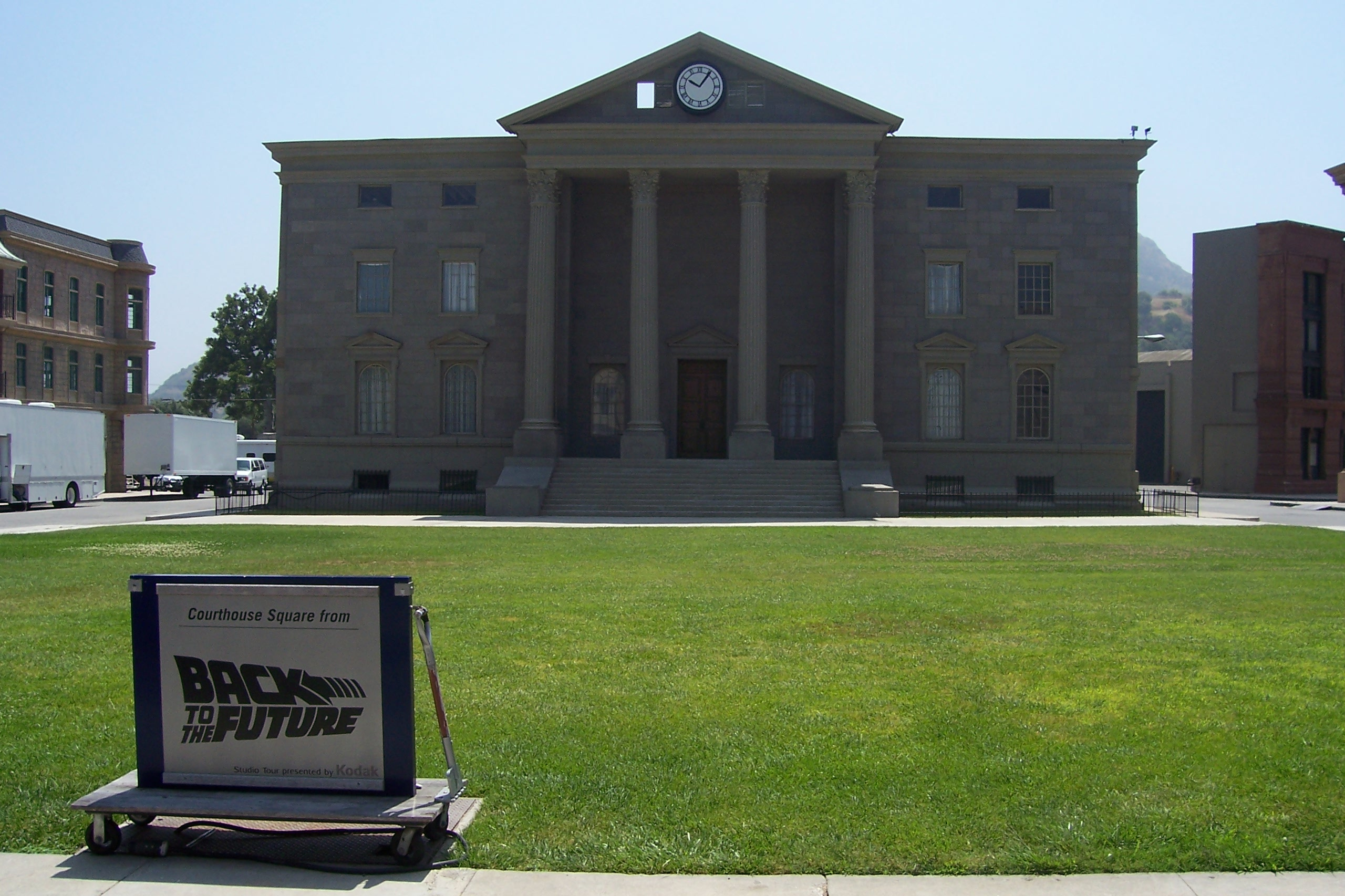
The Hill Valley town square and clock tower were a set built on the Universal Studios' backlot.

Fox's first day on set was January 15, 1985. The first scene he filmed was with Lea Thompson, when their characters first meet in Lorraine's bedroom in 1955. Fox filmed Family Ties during the day before traveling to the Back to the Future filming location. Often, he would not return home until early the following morning, and on weekends, the schedule was pushed back further as Family Ties was filmed in front of a live audience. The teamster drivers entrusted with dropping off Fox at home often had to carry the actor to bed. This continued until April, when Family Ties finished filming. Gale said Fox's youth meant he could cope with less sleep than usual; Fox described it as exhausting, but worth the effort. Further into the filming schedule, Fox was energetic during his scenes but struggled to stay awake off set. He ad-libbed some lines when he forgot the intended dialogue, and recalled looking for a camcorder on the Family Ties set, before realizing it was a prop on Back to the Future. He also had to learn to mimic playing the guitar and choreographed skateboarding routines taught by Per Welinder and Bob Schmelzer.

To compensate for his conflicting schedules and reduce production costs, some scenes involving Marty were shot without Fox, who filmed his part separately. Re-shooting scenes allowed the filmmakers to identify problems and implement new ideas. To avoid building an additional classroom set, the opening pan across the array of clocks in Doc Brown's laboratory replaced an opening scene where Marty sets off a fire alarm to get out of detention. The height differences between Stoltz and Fox necessitated other changes, such as a scene of Fox teaching George how to punch because Fox could not reach the necessary prop. According to Gale, once Fox replaced Stoltz, the atmosphere on set improved. Thompson anecdotally said while Stoltz ate lunch alone in his trailer, Fox ate lunch with the cast and crew.

The production used many locations in and around Los Angeles. The clock tower and town square are structures on the Universal Studios Lot in Universal City, California. When filmed from below, Lloyd was positioned on a recreation of the clock tower closer to the ground, but when filmed from above, Lloyd stood atop the tower itself. Production designer Lawrence G. Paull insisted on using the Universal backlot sets because of the difficulties and costs involved in making an on-location area look 1955-appropriate. Whittier High School in the city of Whittier is the Hill Valley high school. Marty's home and the surrounding Lyon estates are in Arleta, Los Angeles. Several of the residential locations were filmed in Pasadena: Lorraine's and George's 1955 homes, and Doc Brown's 1955 home. (Its exterior is the Gamble House; interiors were shot at the historic Blacker House.) Puente Hills Mall in City of Industry, California serves as the Twin Pines mall, which later becomes the Lone Pine mall after Marty knocks over one of the trees at Twin Pines ranch in 1955, which was filmed at Disney's Golden Oak Ranch in Newhall, Santa Clarita, California. Other locations include the basement of the Hollywood United Methodist Church where the school dance was filmed, and Griffith Park, where Marty begins his drive to the courthouse to return to 1985, passing by a lamp post outside the Greek Theatre.

Filming concluded after 107 days on April 26, 1985. The final day of filming included pick-up shots of Marty and Einstein the dog in the DeLorean.

=== Post-production ===
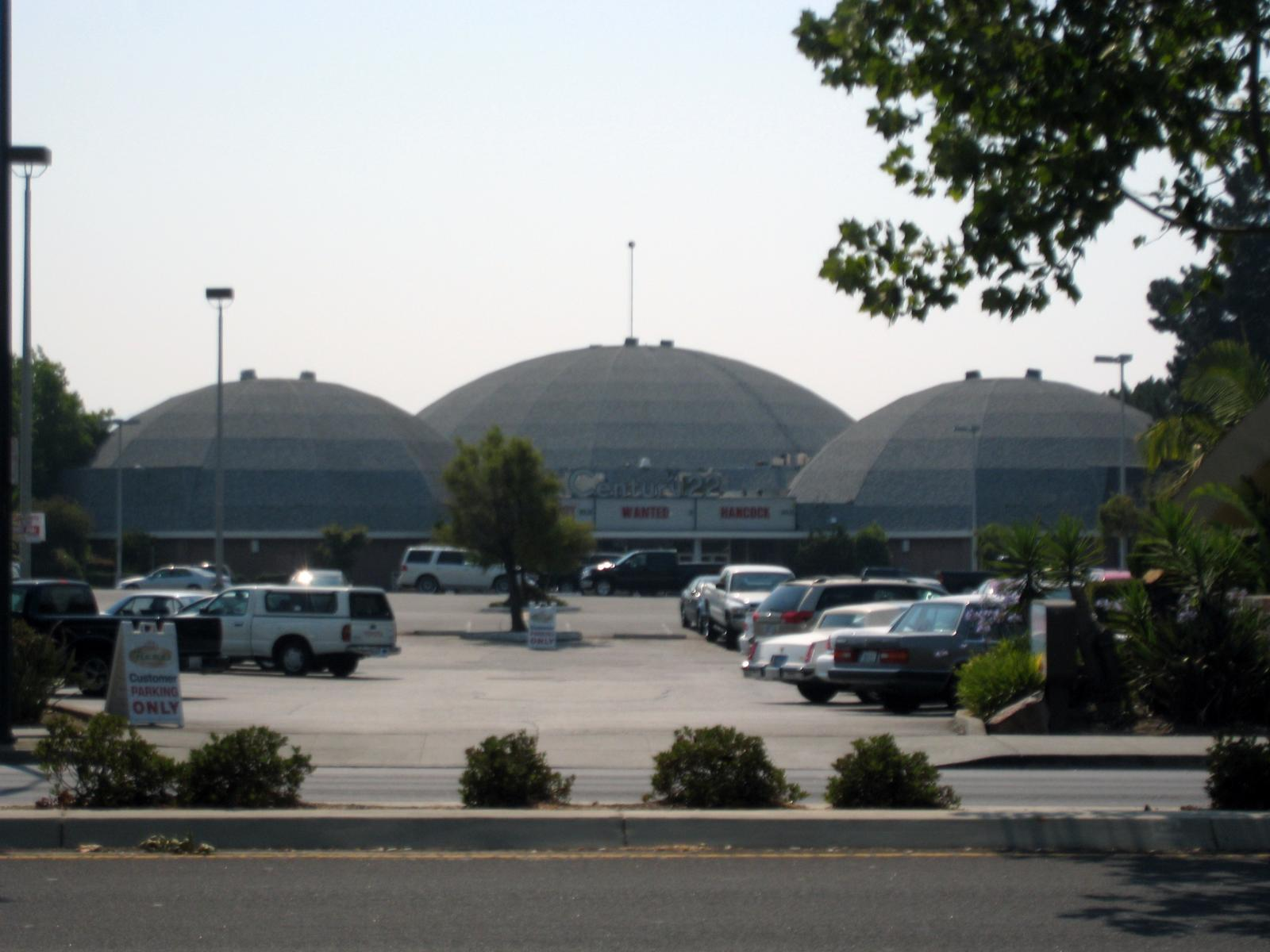
A rough cut of the film was test screened for audiences at Century 22 theater in San Jose, California, only three weeks after filming concluded.

Arthur F. Repola served as the post-production supervisor, but he became responsible for many aspects outside his role, including budgets, storyboarding, and general problem-solving. Those roles belonged to Kennedy and Marshall, but both were occupied on other films. Schmidt found editing the film difficult because he had to imagine where the special effects would later be added; there was no time or budget to re-edit afterward.

A rough version of the movie was cut together for a test screening at the Century 22 theater in San Jose, California, in mid-May 1985, just three weeks after filming concluded. The audience was seemingly uninterested at the exposition-heavy opening but became engaged after the DeLorean appeared. At a test screening in Long Beach, California, 94% of the audience responded they would recommend the film; 99% rated it very good or excellent. Gale said there was some concern when Doc's dog Einstein was sent through time, as the audience believed he had been killed. But Gale said when they came to the cafe scene where Marty sees his father, the audience "got it". The film was re-cut and screened again at the Alfred Hitchcock Theater at the Universal lot for executives, including Sheinberg. He was so impressed he moved the scheduled release date forward to July 3, 1985, to give it more time in theaters during the peak summer season. The new date reduced the post-production schedule to just nine weeks for special effects and editing. Zemeckis spent much of June rushing to finish the film.

Deleted scenes include: Doc looking at an issue of Playboy, remarking the future looks better; a scene of 1985 George being coerced into buying a large amount of peanut brittle from a young girl; a scene of young George trapped in a phone booth by the man who interrupts his dance with Lorraine; and the scene of Marty pretending to be "Darth Vader", which was shortened. Zemeckis considered cutting the "Johnny B. Goode" performance because it did not advance the story, but test audiences reacted well to it. There is a dispute if a shot of Stoltz's hand is in the finished film in the scene where Marty punches Biff. Gale noted it is impossible to tell without checking the original film negative, which would risk damaging it. The final 116‑minute cut was completed on June 23, 1985. Universal took out a full-page advertisement in Variety magazine, thanking the post-production crew for completing their work on time. The final budget was $19 million.

=== Music ===
Alan Silvestri – Back to the Future
Alan Silvestri wanted to create a "heroic" theme that could be recognizable from only a few notes.

Alan Silvestri composed the score for Back to the Future; he had worked with Zemeckis on Romancing the Stone. The only direction Zemeckis gave him was "it's got to be big". Silvestri used an orchestral score to create a sound that contrasted with the small-town setting and the significant time-changing events occurring within it. He wanted a heroic theme that would be instantly recognizable.

Huey Lewis was approached to write a theme song for the film; he was coming off the success of his recent album Sports. He met with Gale, Spielberg, and Zemeckis, who intended that Huey Lewis and the News be Marty's favorite band. Though flattered, Lewis did not want to participate because he did not know how to write film songs and did not want to write one called "Back to the Future". Zemeckis assured Lewis he could write any song he wanted. Lewis agreed to submit the next song he wrote, which was "The Power of Love". Lewis maintains "Power of Love" was his first submission, but Zemeckis recalled a different first song that was rejected. Lewis later acquiesced to Zemeckis's request for a second song, "Back in Time".

Musician Eddie Van Halen performed the guitar riff Marty (dressed as "Darth Vader") uses to wake George. The filmmakers wanted to use Van Halen's music, but the band refused to take part, so Eddie took part on his own. Mark Campbell provided Marty's singing voice, but did not receive credit, as the filmmakers wanted to pretend Fox was singing. When music supervisor Bones Howe learned of this, he secured Campbell a small percentage of the soundtrack revenue as compensation. Paul Hanson taught Fox how to use a guitar to play "Johnny B. Goode", and choreographer Brad Jeffries spent four weeks teaching Fox to replicate various rock star moves popularized by artists like Pete Townshend, Jimi Hendrix, and Chuck Berry. Berry withheld permission to use "Johnny B. Goode" until the day before filming, receiving $50,000 for the rights. Harry Waters Jr. provided the vocals on "Earth Angel".

== Design ==
=== Special effects ===
Industrial Light & Magic (ILM) developed the film's special effects under the supervision of Ken Ralston and Kevin Pike. It contains approximately 27–32 special effects shots, compared to the 300 such shots typical in contemporaneous higher-budget films. Despite working simultaneously on The Goonies and Cocoon, Ralston took on the additional project because it required relatively few effects, and he wanted to realize the original ending of Marty driving the time machine into a nuclear explosion. The team had a nine-and-a-half-week schedule, reduced to less than nine once Universal moved up the release date. ILM was working on Back to the Future up to the moment it had to be handed over to print the theatrical film reels.

The tight schedule affected the special effects' quality. Ralston was disappointed by the scene where Marty's hand fades away as his future is altered. Fox was filmed separately from his hand and the two were composited together; the hand was filmed with a wide-angle lens, making it appear too large, and it had to be scaled down. Zemeckis wanted a subtle fade, but it resulted in a small circle of the hand fading away and there was no time to fix it. In the same scene, Marty and his siblings fade away from a photo. ILM found it difficult to fade the photo's individual aspects, especially as it was moving on the neck of a guitar. A replica of the guitar neck was constructed at four times the normal size; the guitar strings were made of cable up to a quarter-inch thick. An 11-by-14 aluminum plate was attached to hold the enlarged photograph. ILM used a version of the photo without Marty or his siblings and individually pasted each character into the photo. When this failed, four different photos were used: one containing the background, and one for each McFly sibling. A mechanical camera cycled through each photo and printed it to the film. The enlarged guitar was moved around to add to the realism.

The original nuclear explosion ending was considered too complicated and expensive, with an estimated cost of $1 million. Art director Andrew Probert storyboarded the scene, which would have been created using sets and miniatures. With the ending moved to the clock tower, ILM researched storms to achieve the right aesthetic. Clouds were constructed from polyester fiberfill, suspended in a net, and filmed from above while Ralston shone a powerful light from below. He used a rheostat to rapidly change the lights' intensity to imitate lightning.

Developed by Wes Takahashi's animation department, the lightning bolt that strikes the clock tower was described as "the largest bolt of lightning in cinematic history". It was intended to originate in the distance and move closer, but the footage was filmed too close to the tower and there was insufficient space between it and the top of the frame. There was also an issue with showing the bolt onscreen for too long as it made it more obviously animated. The frame count was reduced, but the bolt did not look chaotic enough. Zemeckis picked out a single frame of the bolt in an "S" formation and asked that the effect focus on that shape and be reduced to twenty frames. The bolt was drawn in black ink on white paper; diffusion effects and a glow were added by the optical department.

=== The DeLorean time machine ===
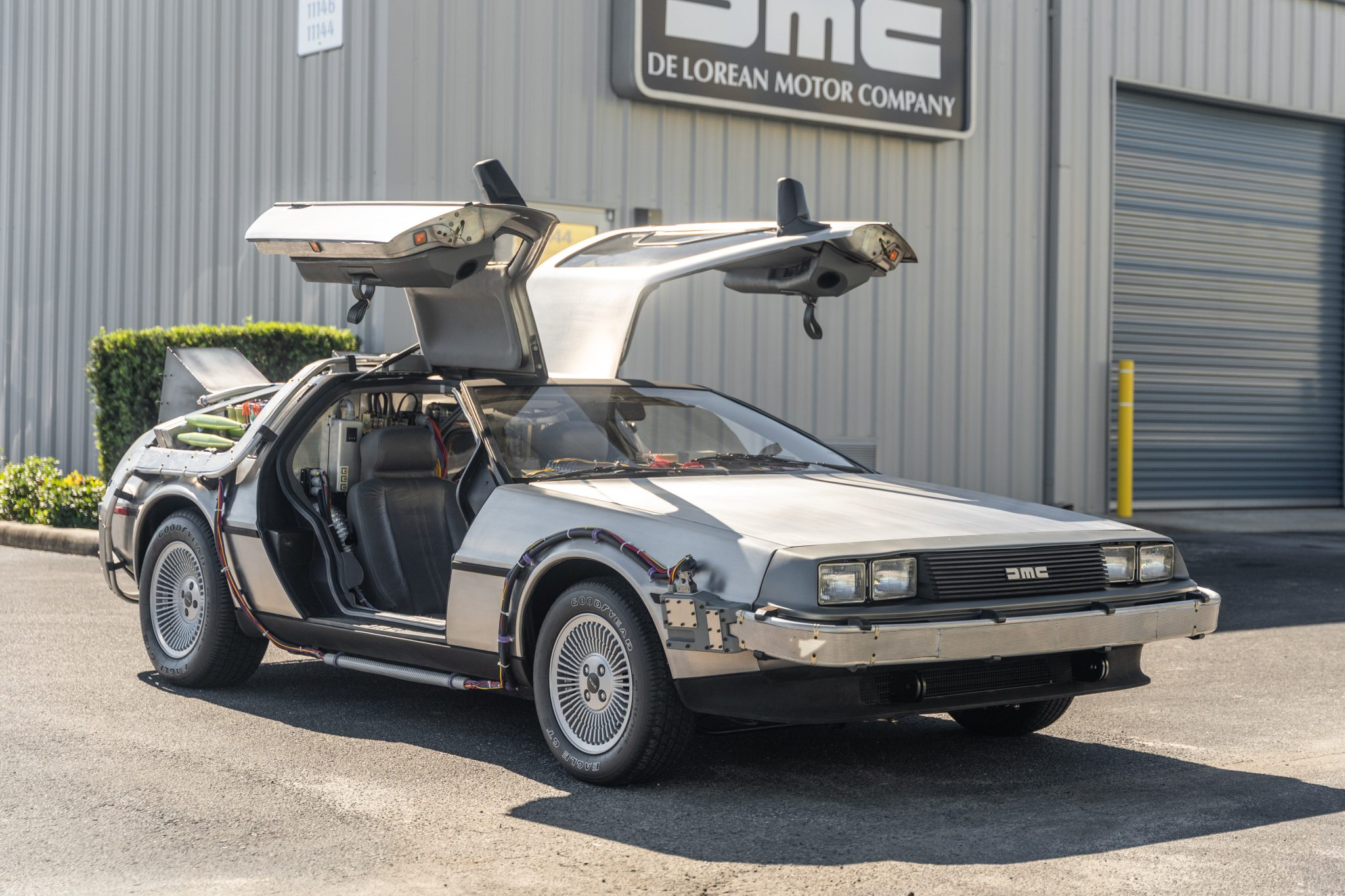
A replica of the DeLorean time machine on display in 2021

The DeLorean was developed under the supervision of Lawrence Paull, who designed it with artist Ron Cobb and illustrator Andrew Probert. They intended for the vehicle to look fixed together from common parts. The time machine was originally conceived as a stationary device; at one point it was a refrigerator. Spielberg vetoed the idea, concerned child viewers might attempt to climb into one. Zemeckis suggested the DeLorean because it offered mobility and a unique design; the gull-wing doors would appear like an alien UFO to a 1950s family. The Ford Motor Company offered $75,000 to use a Ford Mustang instead; Gale responded, "Doc Brown doesn't drive a fucking Mustang". Michael Fink was hired as the art department liaison and tasked with realizing Cobb's sketches and overseeing the car's construction. He was recruited by Paull and Canton, who had worked with him on Blade Runner (1982) and Buckaroo Banzai, respectively. Fink had a project lined up but agreed to help in the free weeks he had remaining. Three DeLoreans used were purchased from a collector: one for stunts, one for special effects, and a more detailed hero version for close-up shots. They were unreliable and often broke down. 88 miles per hour (142 kilometers per hour) was chosen as the time travel speed because it was easy to remember and looked "cool" on the speedometer.

The flying DeLorean in the final scene used a combination of live-action footage, animation, and a 1:5 scale (approximately 33 inches (840 millimeters) long) model built by Steve Gawley and the model shop crew. The act of the DeLorean traveling through time was called the 'time slice' effect. Zemeckis knew only that he wanted the transition to be violent. He described it as a "Neanderthal sitting on the hood of the DeLorean and chipping away the fabric of time in front of him". The effect is so quick as to be imperceptible. Zemeckis preferred this, as he did not want the audience to think too much about how everything worked.

=== Art direction and makeup ===
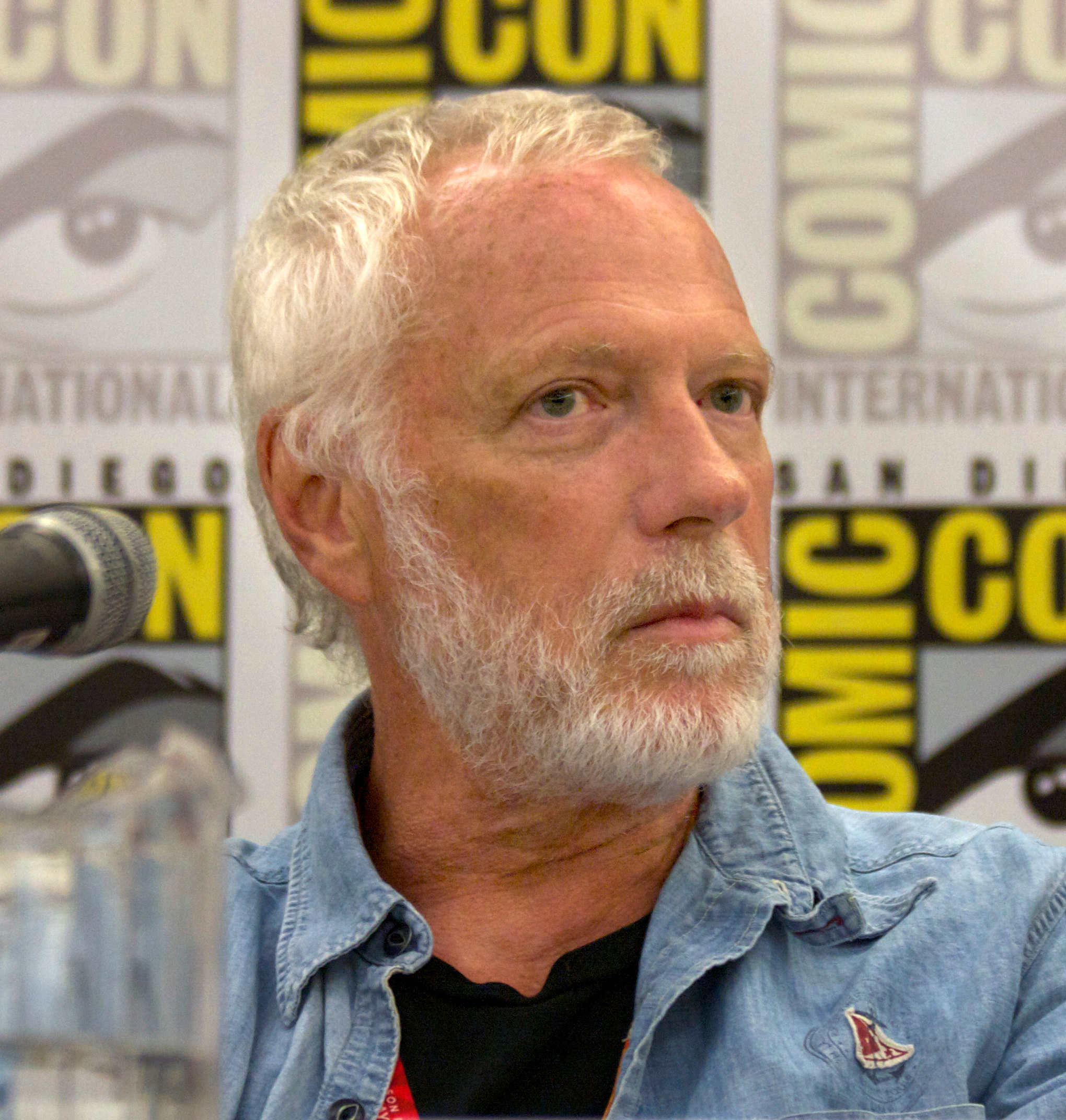
Artist Drew Struzan in 2012. He designed the Back to the Future theatrical release poster.

Actual brand names, such as Texaco, were used to make the sets more realistic, and the producers mandated the inclusion of certain brands that had paid to appear in the film. An unidentified gas company offered a large sum to be included, but Paull used Texaco because it reminded him of a joke from The Milton Berle Show. This choice led to some disputes, such as Pepsi parent company, PepsiCo, wanting to omit a joke about the Tab drink made by its rival Coca-Cola. Twenty clock wranglers were needed to synch up the many clocks in the opening scene, and pulleys were used to start them simultaneously. Drew Struzan produced the film's poster. The producers hoped his in-demand poster artwork would generate further interest in the film.

The film uses a stylized adaptation of the 1950s aesthetics, closer to television show interpretations than an exact recreation. Modern technologies such as contemporary fabrics were used because the designers believed the fashions of the time were not interesting. To represent characters across three decades, the filmmakers did not want to have older actors stand in for the younger ones, believing the change would be obvious and distracting. Special effects artist Ken Chase performed makeup tests on the young actors to age them; initial results were discouraging. He created a prosthetic neck and a bald cap with a receding hairline for Glover but considered them excessive. Chase found it difficult to balance aging the actors and retaining enough of their natural appearance to remain recognizable.

Casts were made of the actors' faces, from which plaster molds were made. Chase sculpted more subtle effects over the plaster molds using latex. For Lorraine, he crafted jowls and eye bags, plus body padding to reflect her increased weight and alcohol abuse. Instead of a receding hairline, Chase changed the style of George's hair; he used prosthetics only to give him a less-defined jawline. Biff's character changed more significantly because Chase wanted him to look "obnoxious"; he was fattened, given sideburns, and a comb over hairstyle to hide a growing bald spot. The prosthetics were combined with makeup and lighting to further age the characters.

Chase found the work frustrating compared to his experiences with more fantastical prostheses that made it easier to hide defects. The rubber latex did not reflect light the same way as natural skin, so Chase used a stippling process (creating a pattern with small dots) to variegate the actors' faces to better conceal where the skin and prosthetics met; close-up shots were avoided. Doc's appearance was not altered significantly. Chase painted latex on Lloyd which, when removed, caused crinkles in the skin, onto which other elements, such as liver spots and shadows, were painted.

== Release ==
=== Context ===
The logo for Back to the Future

By June 1985, the theatrical industry had experienced a 14% decline in ticket sales over the previous year's $4 billion record sales. The summer period (beginning the final week of May) had 45 films scheduled for release, including Rambo: First Blood Part II, The Goonies, Brewster's Millions, Fletch, and the latest James Bond film A View to a Kill. This 25% increase over the previous year's releases led to concerns among industry professionals the competition would divide audiences and limit financial returns, at a time when the average cost of making and marketing a film had increased to $14.5 million and $7 million, respectively. A higher budget to secure a popular, and thus profitable, cast was considered a suitable risk. Most films scheduled for release were aimed at younger audiences, focusing on fantasy and the supernatural. Reflecting the times, these fantasy elements often employed a technological source instead of a magical one. Only a few films, like Cocoon and Prizzi's Honor, targeted adults.

Initially, Back to the Future was scheduled to be released in May 1985, but was pushed back to June 21, the earliest Zemeckis could have the film ready. The delay caused by Stoltz's replacement pushed the release back to July 19, and later to August. Sheinberg moved the release date forward to July 3, giving it an extra sixteen days of theatrical screen time during the industry's most profitable period of the year. The move offered about 100,000 extra screenings, together worth an estimated $40 million. He said he also wanted to avoid the negative perception of films released later in the summer period; other blockbuster films were usually released early. The change required renegotiations with theater owners to secure screens in an already-crowded marketplace. In some cities, it was legally required that exhibitors be shown a film before purchase; an unfinished cut of the film was shown to theater owners and young test audiences. They described it as lesser than E.T. the Extra-Terrestrial or Ghostbusters, but still a guaranteed box office hit. Fox was unavailable for promotional work because he was filming Family Ties Vacation (1985) in London.

=== Box office ===
In the United States (U.S.) and Canada, Back to the Future received a wide release on July 3, 1985, ahead of the Independence Day holiday weekend. The film earned $3.6 million during the opening Wednesday and Thursday, and a further $11.3 million during its inaugural weekend from 1,420 theaters – an average of $7,853 per theater. Back to the Future finished as the number one film of the weekend ahead of Western Pale Rider ($7 million), in its second weekend, and Rambo: First Blood Part II ($6.4 million) in its seventh. It retained the number one position in its second weekend with a further gross of $10.6 million, ahead of the debuting action film Mad Max Beyond Thunderdome ($7.8 million) and Cocoon ($5 million), and in its third weekend, ahead of the re-release of E.T. the Extra-Terrestrial ($8.8 million) and Mad Max Beyond Thunderdome ($5.4 million). Although it fell to number two in its fourth weekend, behind the debuting National Lampoon's European Vacation ($12.3 million), Back to the Future regained the number one position in its fifth weekend and remained there for the following eight weeks. Recalling the opening weeks, Gale said, "our second weekend was higher than our first weekend, which is indicative of great word of mouth."

The film remained a steady success, earning $155 million by October, surpassing Rambo: First Blood Part II's $149 million box office earnings to become the year's highest-grossing film. In total, Back to the Future was the number one film for eleven of its twelve first weeks and remained in the top ten highest-grossing films for a total of twenty-four. By the end of its theatrical run, Back to the Future earned an approximate box office gross of $210.6 million, (Note: The 1985 United States and Canada box office gross of $210.6 million is equivalent to $630 million in 2025.) making it the highest-grossing film of 1985, ahead of Rambo: First Blood Part II ($150.4 million), the sports drama Rocky IV ($127.9 million), and the drama The Color Purple ($94.2 million). Box Office Mojo estimated more than 59 million tickets were sold. Industry experts suggest that as of 1997 the box office returns to the studio (minus the theaters' share) was $105.5 million. (Note: The estimated returns to the studio from the United States and Canada box office gross is $105.5 million, equivalent to $316 million in 2025.)

The year was considered an unsuccessful one for film. Despite a record number of film releases, ticket sales were down 17% compared with 1984. Industry executives blamed the problem, in part, on a lack of originality, and a glut of youth-oriented films targeted at those under 18. Only Back to the Future and Rambo: First Blood Part II were considered blockbusters, earning more than double the box office of Cocoon. Films offering escapism and pro-America themes also fared well. After years of poor performances, Back to the Future, alongside Fletch, Brewster's Millions, and Mask, reversed Universal Pictures' fortunes.

Outside the United States and Canada, the film earned a further estimated $170.5 million, (Note: The 1985 worldwide box office gross of $170.5 million is equivalent to $510 million in 2025.) making it the third-highest-grossing film of the year, behind the romantic drama Out of Africa ($179.1 million) and Rocky IV ($172.6 million). Cumulatively, Back to the Future earned a worldwide gross of $381.1 million, making it the highest-grossing film of 1985, ahead of Rocky IV ($300.5 million) and Rambo: First Blood Part II ($300.4 million). (Note: The 1985 worldwide box office gross of $381.1 million is equivalent to $1.14 billion in 2025.) Back to the Future has received several theatrical re-releases to celebrate anniversaries, including a remastered version screened in 2010 and 2025. These releases have raised the film's worldwide total to $393–398.2 million.

== Reception ==
=== Critical response ===
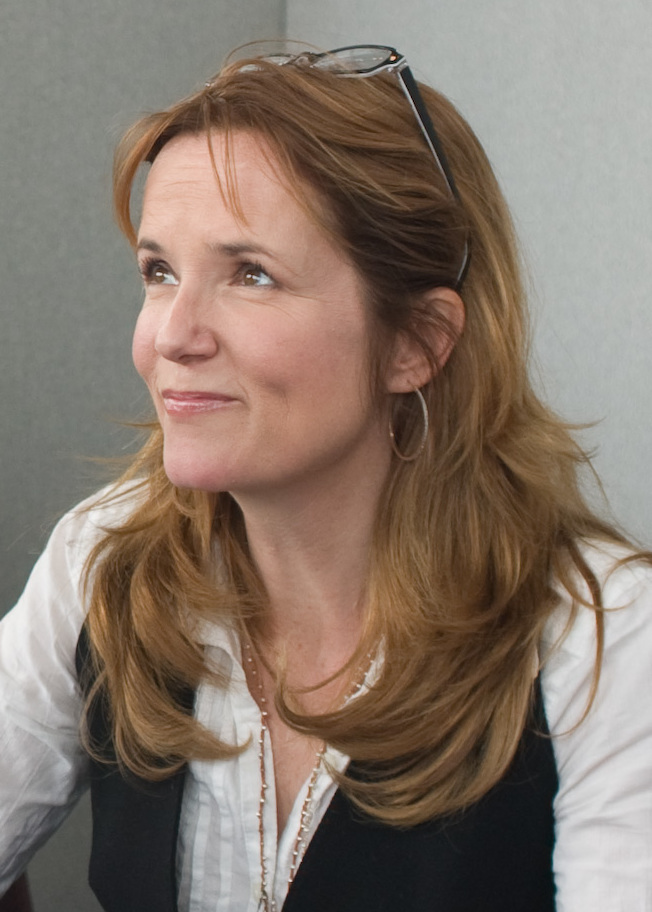
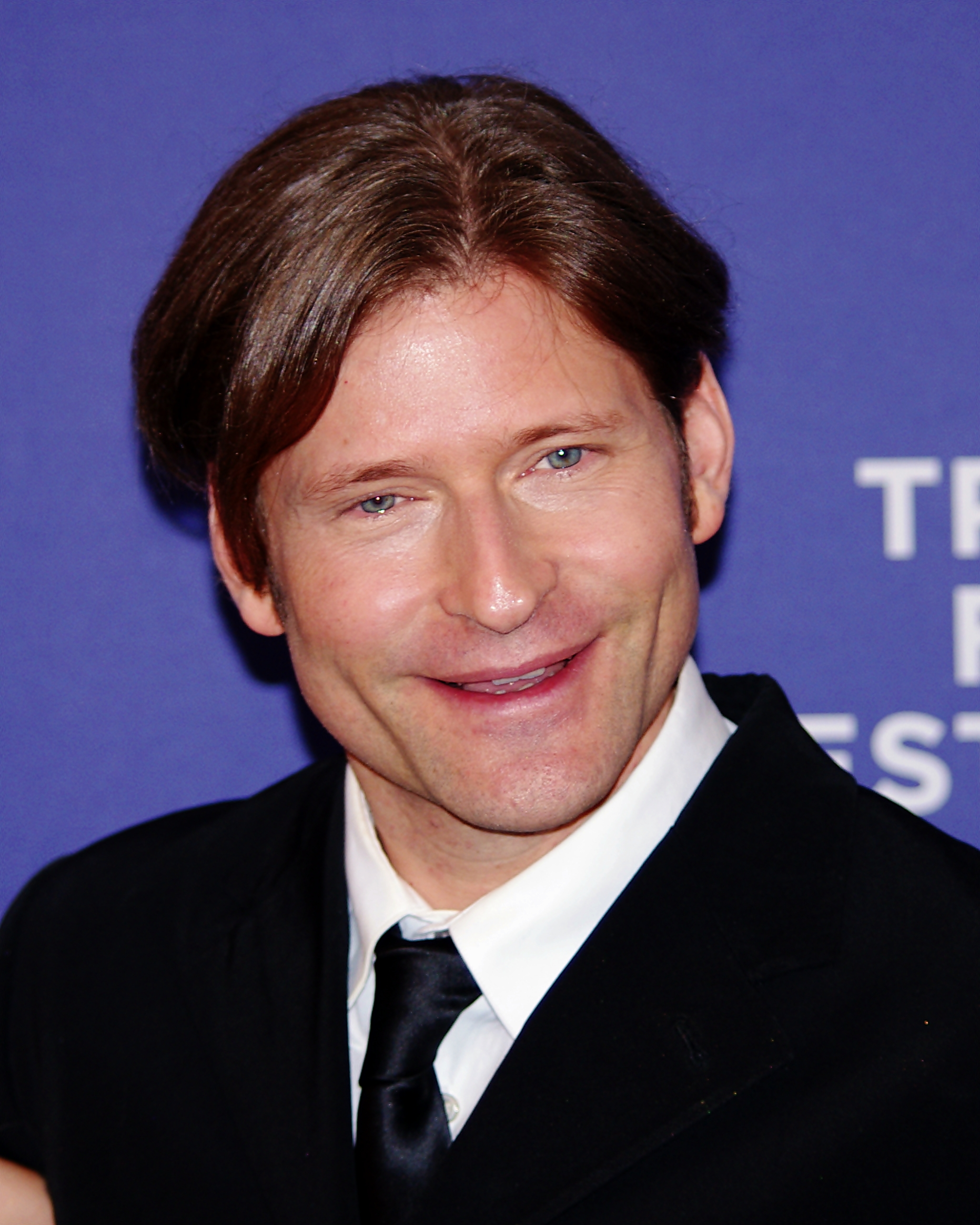
Lea Thompson in 2008 (left) and Crispin Glover in 2012. Critics praised the central cast, including Fox, Lloyd, Thompson, and Glover.

Back to the Future received generally positive reviews from critics. Most reviewers agreed Back to the Future was among the year's most entertaining films, partly because of its focus on storytelling instead of pure spectacle. Paul Attanasio and Gene Siskel argued that while Back to the Future appeared to be "everything wrong" with youth-targeted films, it successfully subverted expectations by focusing on a relatable narrative with an emotional core, and employed irreverent, good-natured humor. They, alongside Richard Corliss, agreed that it would endure because it offered something for children and adults. Some reviewers, such as Corliss and Leonard Maltin agreed that the exposition-heavy opening was Back to the Future's weakest part, but led into a stronger half filled with "wit", "wonder", "comic epiphany", and original ideas.

Dave Kehr remarked that Gale and Zemeckis were among the first generation of filmmakers openly influenced by growing up on televised entertainment, and their inspirations are evident throughout. The Hollywood Reporter said that despite Spielberg's producer role, it was Zemeckis's vision, being more subtle, gentler, and "less noisy". Some reviewers compared it favorably to the 1946 fantasy drama It's a Wonderful Life, which offered a similar premise of a central character changing his future. Roger Ebert said the film offered humanity, charm, humor, and many surprises that were among its "greatest pleasures". Sheila Benson was more critical; she found Back to the Future to be overproduced and underdeveloped, featuring a hollow ending focused on materialistic rewards and lacking tension because Marty's success never seemed in doubt. Siskel countered that the tension came from defying the expectations of a typical time travel film by making the past mutable and the future uncertain. Paul Attanasio criticized some aspects that seemed to be "mechanically" designed to create the broadest audience appeal.

The cast performances were generally well received, particularly those of Fox, Lloyd, Thompson, and Glover. Reviewers consistently praised Fox's "appealing" performance, although some believed Lloyd's performance outshone the rest. (Note: Attributed to multiple references:) Kehr and Attanasio considered his uncontrolled performance and unique "intensity" a tribute to mad scientist characters, portrayed by the likes of Sid Caesar and John Belushi, while creating the definitive scientist archetype for modern audiences. In contrast, Vincent Canby and Variety's review said that Thompson's "deceptively passionate" performance and Glover's bumbling-to-confident character provided Back to the Future's standout performances. Some reviewers considered the use of Libyan terrorists, an actual fear at the time, to be in poor taste.

Audiences polled by CinemaScore gave the film an average grade of "A" on an A+ to F scale.

=== Accolades ===
Back to the Future received four nominations at the 43rd Golden Globe Awards, for Best Motion Picture (Musical or Comedy), Best Actor in a Motion Picture (Musical or Comedy) (Fox), Best Original Song ("The Power of Love"), and Best Screenplay (Gale and Zemeckis). The film was also named Favorite Motion Picture at the 12th People's Choice Awards. At the 1986 Academy Awards, Back to the Future received one award for Best Sound Effects Editing (Charles L. Campbell and Robert Rutledge). It received a further three nominations: Best Original Screenplay (Gale and Zemeckis); Best Sound (Bill Varney, B. Tennyson Sebastian II, Robert Thirlwell, and William B. Kaplan); and Best Original Song ("The Power of Love").

At the 39th British Academy Film Awards, Back to the Future received five nominations, including Best Film, Best Original Screenplay (Gale and Zemeckis), Best Visual Effects (Pike and Ralston), Best Production Design (Paull), and Best Editing (Schmidt and Keramidas). At the 13th Saturn Awards, the film won three awards: Best Science Fiction Film, Best Actor (Fox), and Best Special Effects (Pike). It also won the Hugo Award for Best Dramatic Presentation. Back to the Future performed well internationally: it won Best Foreign Producer (Spielberg) and Best Foreign Screenplay at the David di Donatello awards (Italy), Outstanding Foreign Film from the Japan Academy, and the Goldene Leinwand (Germany) for selling more than three million tickets in its first eighteen months.

== Post-release ==
=== Home media ===
Back to the Future was released on VHS on May 22, 1986, priced at $79.95, becoming the first film to sell 450,000 units at that price point, and was also the most-rented cassette of the year. A sequel was not planned until after Back to the Future's theatrical release, and a "To Be Continued ..." graphic was appended to the end of the home release to promote awareness of future films. When Back to the Future was released on DVD in 2002, the graphic was removed because Gale and Zemeckis wanted it to be faithful to an in-theater experience. It debuted on Blu-ray in 2010 for the film's 25th anniversary. The release featured a six-part documentary including interviews with the cast and crew, behind-the-scenes footage, deleted scenes, and associated music videos from all three films. The release also included the public debut of footage of Stoltz portraying Marty McFly. (Note: Attributed to multiple references:) For its 35th anniversary in 2020, a remastered 4K Ultra HD version was released on Blu-ray and Ultra HD Blu-ray. Along with extras included in previous releases, this edition included audition footage and an exploration of the film's props hosted by Gale. Limited edition SteelBook cases and a display replicate of the levitating hoverboard from Back to the Future Part II were also available.

The Back to the Future soundtrack was released in July 1985 on cassette tape, LP record, and compact disc (CD). The soundtrack's lead single, "The Power of Love", peaked at number one on the U.S. Billboard Hot 100. Sales were initially slow, but it eventually peaked at number twelve on the Billboard 200, in part because of the success of "The Power of Love". Silvestri's score received a limited release in 2009 on CD, containing the film score and unreleased variations. The scores for all three Back to the Future films were first released on LP record in 2016, individually and as a collection. Silvestri supervised the remaster of the original master recordings, including previously unreleased tracks, and Gale contributed liner notes.

=== Other media ===
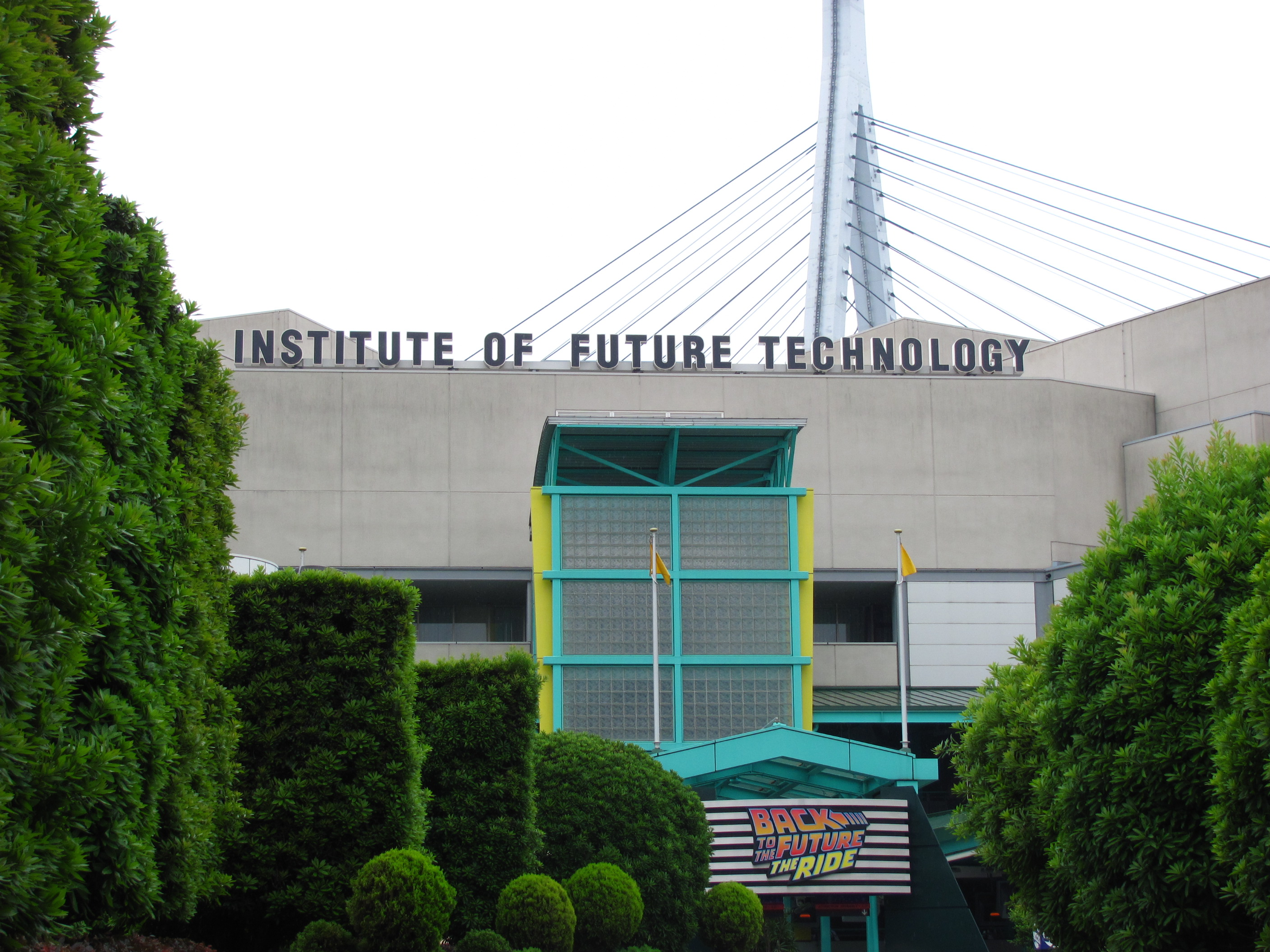
Back to the Future: The Ride at Universal Studios Japan in 2011

In 1985, film merchandising was a relatively new concept, popularized by the original Star Wars film trilogy (1977–1983). As Back to the Future was not specifically aimed at children, there was no significant merchandising accompanying its release. Although a novelization by George Gipe was released in 1985, one of the earliest items for children, a rideable DeLorean, was not released until 1986. The film and its sequels have since been represented across a wide variety of merchandise including: Playmobil, playing cards, clothing, pottery, posters, board games, sculpted figures, plush toys, Funko POP! figures, action figures, Hot Wheels and die-cast vehicles, books, music albums, and Christmas ornaments.

Back to the Future received several video game adaptations. Back to the Future was released alongside the film for the Amstrad CPC, Commodore 64, and ZX Spectrum. An arcade-adventure game, Back to the Future, was released in 1989 for the Nintendo Entertainment System. Gale called it one of the worst games ever made and advised people against purchasing it. Back to the Future: The Pinball was released in 1990, although Fox refused permission for the game to use his likeness. An episodic graphic adventure game, Back to the Future: The Game, was released in 2010. Gale contributed to the game's narrative, which takes place after the events of the third film. An area in Lego Dimensions is based on Back to the Future and features voice work by Lloyd.

Back to the Future: The Ride, a simulator ride, ran from 1991 to 2007 at Universal Studios Hollywood and Universal Studios Florida. The ride's development was supervised by Spielberg and featured Doc Brown (Lloyd) chasing down Biff (Wilson) who has stolen the DeLorean. A version of the ride at Universal Studios Japan ran from 2001 to 2016. A Back to the Future-themed Monopoly board game was released in 2015. A Funko board game was released in 2020. It casts players as one of the main characters from the films to battle different Tannens across history.

There have been several books about the making of the film series. We Don't Need Roads: The Making of the Back to the Future Trilogy is an oral history by those involved in the production. Back to the Future: The Ultimate Visual History, a book chronicling the development of the entire Back to the Future franchise, was released in 2015. The British Film Institute released BFI Film Classics: Back to the Future about the film's background. The series also includes comic books detailing Doc's and Marty's adventures before and after the events depicted in the films. A crossover between the Back to the Future and Transformers franchises included a transforming DeLorean toy and associated comic books.

== Thematic analysis ==
=== Parental relationships and fate ===
The main theme of Back to the Future concerns taking control and personal responsibility over one's destiny: a situation can be changed even if it seems otherwise impossible to overcome. Thompson said the film represents how one moment can have a significant and lasting impact on a person's life. Gale believed Doc provided the perfect summary of the series' running theme, when in Back to the Future Part III he said: "Your future is whatever you make it, so make it a good one."

At the start of the film, Marty is rejected at Battle of the Bands and admits he fears his ambitions will remain unrealized. He worries he will end up like his parents and sees direct evidence in 1955 of George, also afraid of rejection, and being unable to approach Lorraine; his fears risk Marty's future. Marty sets about manipulating the past to ensure his survival without concern for what impact his presence in 1955 is having on others. On his return to 1985, he is rewarded with wealthier parents and a nicer car, but he has simultaneously damaged Biff's future, reducing him to a valet for the McFlys. Glover criticized the morality of the film's ending, believing Marty's reward should be happy parents in love with each other, and considered it a result of the film serving corporate interests, promoting the accumulation of wealth and purchasing material objects. In 2015, Zemeckis said the ending was perfect for its time but would be different if he made it now, although Gale disagreed and said he did not apologize for the scene. American audiences generally had no issue with this ending, but it was criticized by some international audiences.

Despite rejection by film studios for not being raunchy enough, Back to the Future alludes to sexual assault, racism, and the Oedipus complex – a psychiatric theory suggesting a child holds an unconscious sexual desire for their opposite-sexed parent, as in the relationship between Marty and his future mother Lorraine in 1955. The relationships between parents and children are the basis of many elements of the film. Thompson believed the film had remained relevant to new generations because of its core idea that Marty's and the viewer's parents were once children and had the same dreams and ambitions they do.

=== Reaganism and American anxieties ===
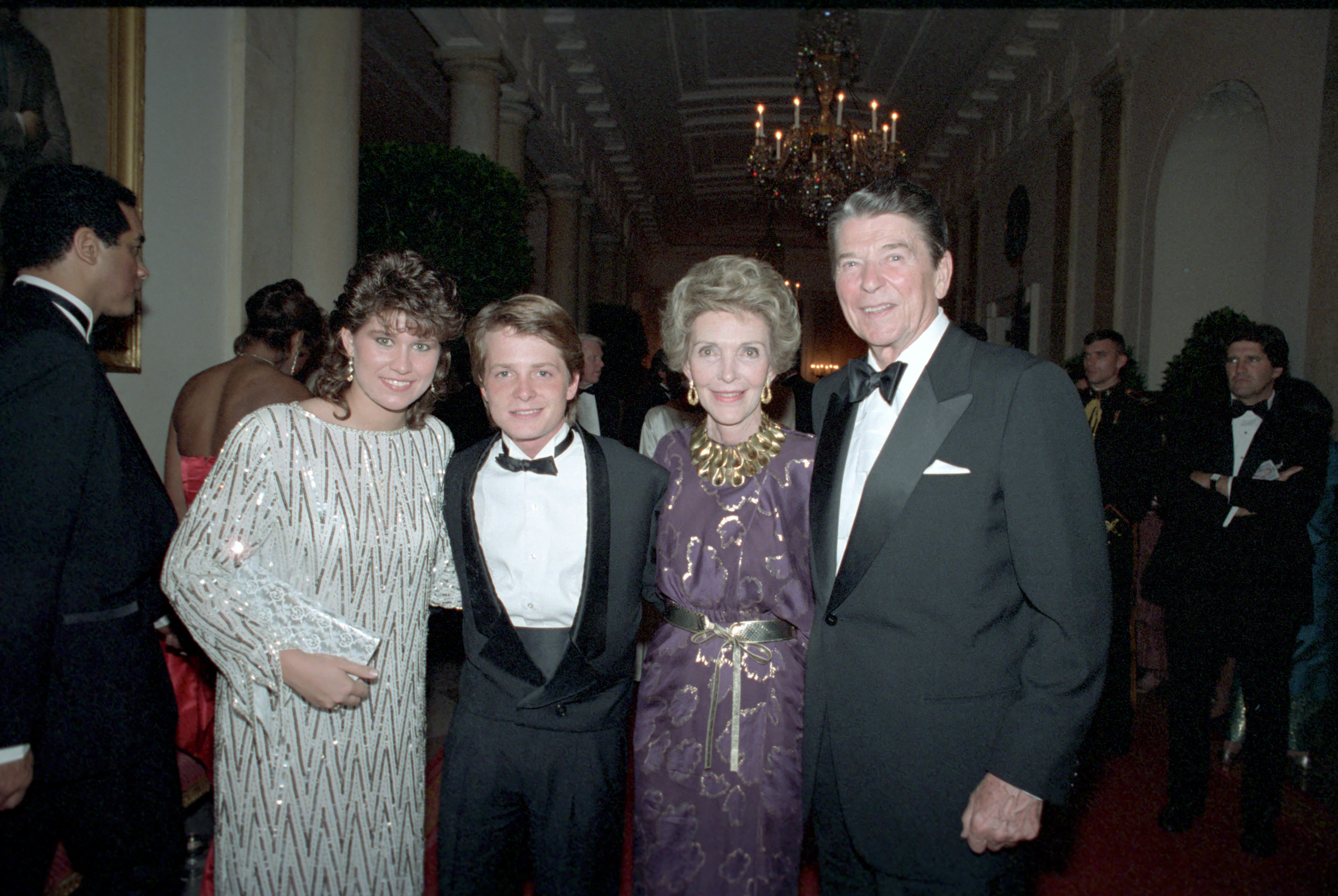
(Left to right) Nancy McKeon, Michael J. Fox, Nancy Reagan, and U.S. President Ronald Reagan in October 1985. Back to the Future has been interpreted as an endorsement of Reagan-era policies concerning the American dream, self-reliance, initiative, and technological advancement.

Critics Justin Chang and Mark Olsen suggest the film can be seen as promoting Reaganism – the political positions of president Ronald Reagan – which endorses older values of the American dream, initiative, and technological advancement. The Hill Valley of 1985 is depicted as run down and in decay, while in 1955 it is presented as a more simplistic and seemingly safer time, seen through a nostalgic lens. Marty's future is bettered because he goes back to 1955 and teaches George to be more assertive and self-reliant; his initiative leads to a more prosperous future for Marty with materialistic rewards. The film uses many brand names of the time, ostensibly to make the setting more realistic, e.g. Mountain Dew, Pepsi, and Texaco, but the filmmakers received financial compensation from the brand owners, making their inclusion promotional and commercialistic instead of artistic.

Film studies lecturer Sorcha Ní Fhlainn argues that many 1980s films resulted from the American public's desire for escapism from cultural anxieties and fears, including nuclear proliferation, unemployment, crime, growing inequality, and the AIDS crisis. In her view, films like those of the Star Wars series and Back to the Future offered a childlike reassurance of safety and comfort, emphasizing idealized American values and the positive effects of instilling power in a patriarchal figure like George McFly or Darth Vader. English professor Susan Jeffords considered Doc Brown to be an analog for Reagan, a man who embraces technological advancement, who conflicts with Libyan terrorists and provides the means for a failing family to better themselves.

The song "Johnny B. Goode" by Chuck Berry is used during the film's final act. Berry initially resisted allowing the song to be used in the film. NPR argued that while Berry's resistance may have been a matter of money, there are underlying racial issues involved in Marty, a white male, seemingly rewriting history to invent the rock and roll music genre, which was heavily influenced by African-American music. The 1955 segment also presents a distorted view of America, showing an African-American band playing at the high school dance, which would have been disallowed. Similarly, the African-American character Goldie Wilson is seemingly inspired to work towards becoming mayor by Marty's intervention, inspiring a Reagan-style initiative and self-reliance.

=== Influences ===
As film fans, Gale and Zemeckis's influences are seen throughout Back to the Future. There are references to The Wizard of Oz (1939), The Shaggy Dog (1959), Dr. Strangelove (1964), Close Encounters of the Third Kind (1977), the Star Wars film series, and television shows including Mister Peabody, Star Trek: The Original Series, The Outer Limits, and The Twilight Zone. There are also allusions to 1960's The Time Machine (based on H. G. Wells's 1895 novella of the same name) and A Connecticut Yankee in King Arthur's Court by Mark Twain, in which the central character seemingly moves through time. The DeLorean dashboard chronometer uses the same color scheme as the time device of The Time Machine. Critic Ray Loynd opined that Doc can be seen as a King Arthur-type, with Marty serving as his knight.

== Legacy ==
=== Cultural influence ===
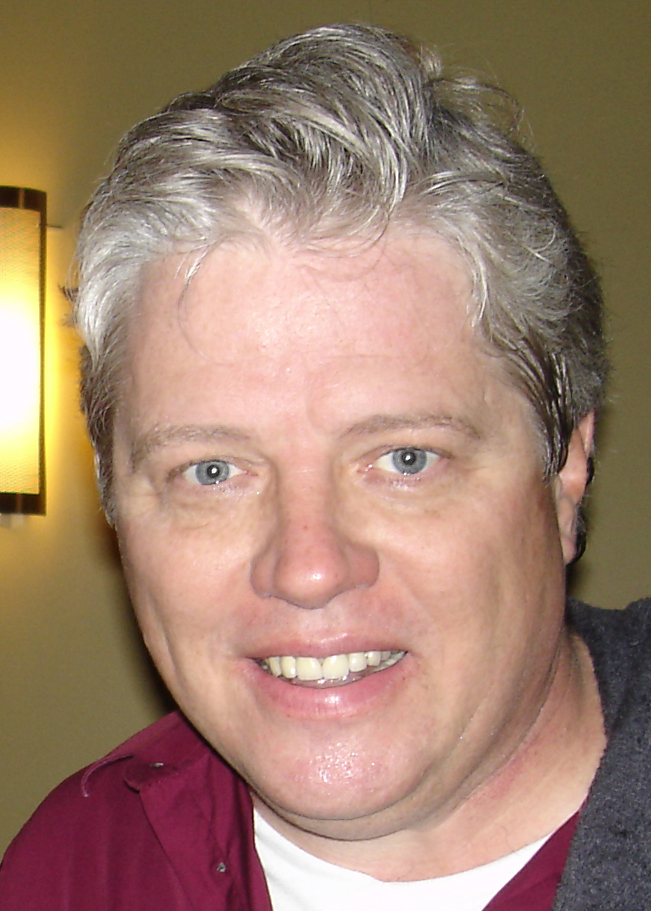
Thomas F. Wilson in 2011. He began carrying cards containing answers to the repetitive questions he was asked by fans about the Back to the Future series.

Since its release, Back to the Future has remained an enduring popular culture touchstone, and in 2007, the United States Library of Congress selected the film for preservation in the National Film Registry for being culturally, historically, or aesthetically significant. The film elevated Fox from a financially struggling actor to one of the most in-demand and globally recognized stars in Hollywood, and Gale received fan mail for decades after its release. He said he understood the continuing appreciation for the original film as it was the "purest" and "most complete" in the series. Fox compared it to The Wizard of Oz (1939), saying it still appeals to children because they do not think of it as an old film. In 2012, Thompson called it the greatest role of her career. Dean Cundey believed it resonated with fans because it offers the fantasy of going back in time to change things and make the present better. Lloyd described being approached by fans from around the world, who have said the film inspired them to become a scientist.

Many of the principal cast have reunited since the film's release. Often these reunions are for charity, including The Michael J. Fox Foundation for Parkinson's disease (Fox was diagnosed with the disease at age 29), and Project HOPE. (Note: Attributed to multiple references:) A 2019 reunion for the TCM Classic Film Festival featured the 4K restoration premiere of Back to the Future. During the 2020 COVID-19 pandemic, Josh Gad hosted a Back to the Future retrospective featuring many cast and crew. The cast has also appeared in advertisements only loosely related to Back to the Future, trading on their associated popularity.

Reagan mentioning the film during his 1986 State of the Union Address on 4 February 1986

The film has global popular appeal, particularly in the United States, the United Kingdom, France, Argentina, the Netherlands, and Japan. On October 21, 2015 (the day Doc and Marty travel to at the end of Back to the Future, as depicted in Back to the Future II) an estimated 27 million social media users discussed the films; the most active users were in the United States, Mexico, the United Kingdom, Canada, and Brazil. Ronald Reagan was also a fan, referring to the film during his 1986 State of the Union Address to appeal to America's young voters, saying, "Never has there been a more exciting time to be alive, a time of rousing wonder and heroic achievement. As they said in the film Back to the Future, 'Where we're going, we don't need roads.'" Although Gale has said that Reagan, after enjoying the joke about Doc Brown's incredulous response to him becoming president, ordered the theater's projectionist to stop the film, roll it back, and run it again, this is disputed by Reagan's advisor, Mark Weinberg. Back to the Future is also seen as responsible for a resurgence of skateboarding in the 1980s. It made skateboarding a mainstream pastime acceptable for all, not just rebellious teenagers.

Back to the Future has been referred to in a variety of media, including television, films, and video games. Doc and Marty, respectively, inspired the eponymous characters of the 2013 animated television show Rick and Morty. The British pop rock band McFly are named for Marty McFly. The 2011 novel Ready Player One by Ernest Cline and the 2018 film adaptation (directed by Spielberg) both heavily refer to the film, including the central character using a DeLorean for transport. Filmmaker J. J. Abrams has also cited it as an inspiration.

The 2015 crowdfunded documentary Back in Time follows various fans of the series and details the impact it has had on their lives, interspersed with interviews from the crew including Fox and Lloyd. The DeLorean is considered one of the most iconic vehicles in film history. DeLorean's creator John DeLorean was a fan of the film and sent personal letters to Gale and Zemeckis, thanking them for using his vehicle. The DeLorean was not a popular vehicle before the film's release. However, in the years since it has become a popular collector's item, the DeLorean Motor Company issued kits enabling fans to make their vehicle look like the DeLorean time machine. Gale led a restoration of one of the original screen-used DeLoreans in 2011, documented in Out of Time: Saving the DeLorean Time Machine.

=== Modern reception ===
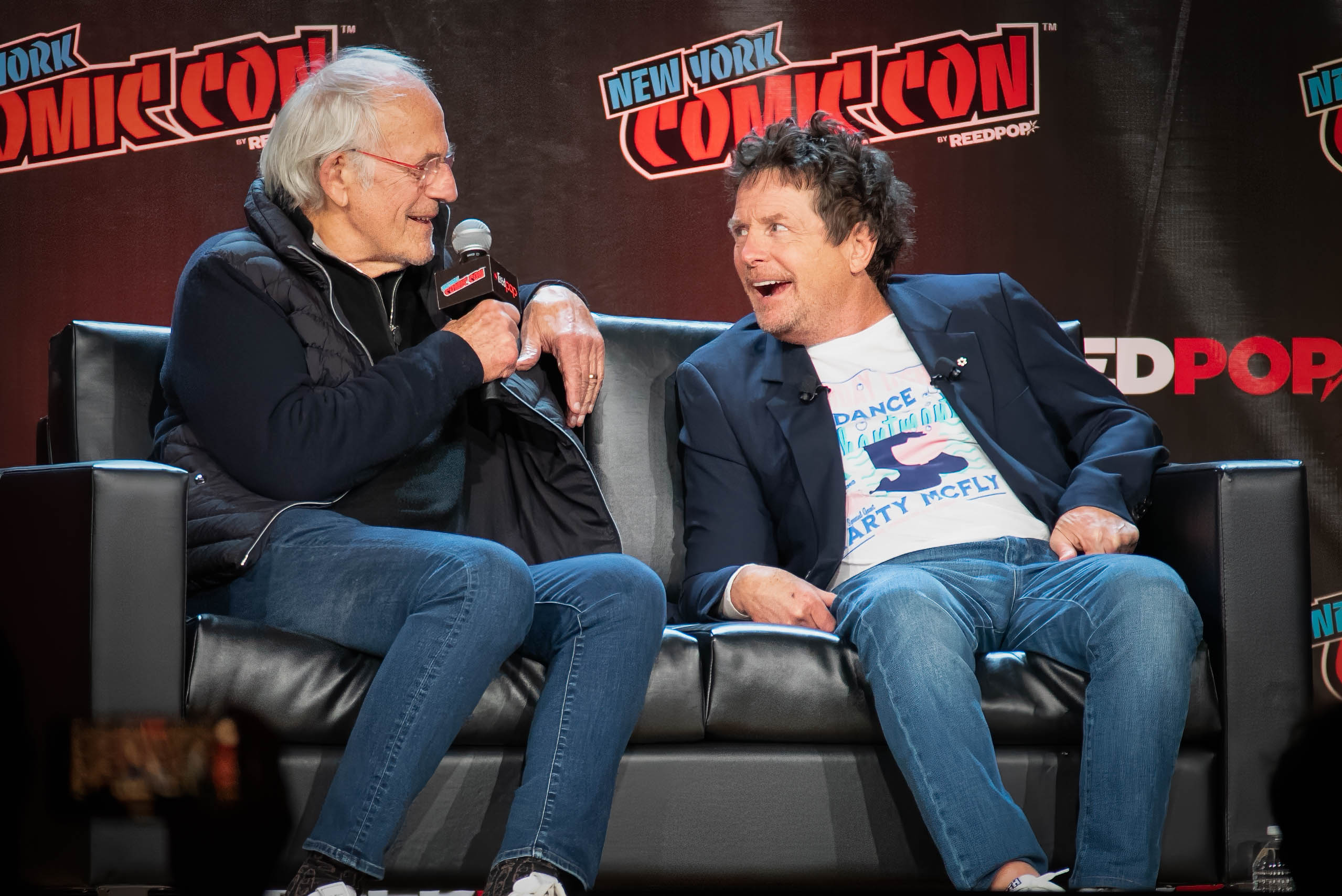
Christopher Lloyd and Michael J. Fox discussing the film at the 2022 New York Comic Con.

Back to the Future is considered a landmark of American cinema, and one of the greatest films ever made. (Note: Attributed to multiple references:) In 2004, The New York Times listed it as one of the 1,000 Best Movies Ever, and the following year its screenplay was listed as the 56th greatest screenplay of the preceding 75 years by the Writers Guild of America. Throughout the rest of the 2000s, it appeared on Film4's 50 Films to See Before You Die (number 10), Empire's 500 Greatest Movies of All Time (number 23), behind the 1977 space opera Star Wars, and the American Film Institute listed it as the number 10 best science fiction film, based on a poll of fifteen hundred people from the creative community. In 2010, Total Film named it one of the 100 greatest movies ever made, and the following year it was voted by BBC Radio 1 and BBC Radio 1Xtra listeners as their fourth favorite film of all time. It is also listed in the film reference book 1001 Movies You Must See Before You Die. A 2014 poll of 2,120 entertainment-industry members by The Hollywood Reporter ranked it as the 12th best film of all time, again behind Star Wars. In 2015, the screenplay was listed as the 67th funniest on the WGA's 101 Funniest Screenplays list, and Rotten Tomatoes also listed the film at number 84 on its list of 200 essential movies to watch.

Several publications have named it as one of the best science fiction films ever made, (Note: Attributed to multiple references:) and one of the best films of the 1980s. (Note: Attributed to multiple references:) Popular Mechanics and Rolling Stone listed it as the number one and number four best time-travel film ever made respectively. Entertainment Weekly named it the 40th most essential film to be watched by pre-teens and the 28th best high-school movie. Marty McFly appeared at number 39 on Empire's 2006 list of its "100 Greatest Movie Characters"; Doc Brown followed at number 76.

Rotten Tomatoes assesses a 93% approval rating from the aggregated reviews of 119 critics, with an average rating of 8.8/10. The site's consensus reads: "Inventive, funny, and breathlessly constructed, Back to the Future is a rousing time-travel adventure with an unforgettable spirit." Based on this score, Rotten Tomatoes also listed it as the 87th best Action and Adventure film. The film has a score of 88 out of 100 on Metacritic based on 27 critics, indicating "universal acclaim". In the United Kingdom, readers of Empire voted the film as 11th on their 2017 list of "The 100 Greatest Movies".

== Sequels and adaptations ==
A sequel was not initially planned, and the teaser ending of Doc, Marty, and Jennifer flying off in the DeLorean suggested their adventures would continue off-screen. Universal Pictures was eager to pursue a sequel based on the significant financial and critical success of Back to the Future. However, Zemeckis and Gale were reluctant to participate, believing sequels often retread the best elements of the original film. They were also concerned that a poor follow-up could alienate Back to the Future's passionate fan base, and undermine the pair after their first major joint success. Zemeckis and Gale acquiesced by 1987, once Universal Pictures clarified they would, if necessary, make a sequel without them. The pair's sequel script was so long it was split into two films, Back to the Future Part II (1989) and Back to the Future Part III (1990); the films were shot back to back.

Part II depicts Marty and Doc traveling to 2015, inadvertently enabling the now-elderly Biff Tannen to steal the DeLorean and return to 1955, rewriting history in his favor. Wells and Glover did not return for the sequels. Part II was a financial success but was criticized for its complex, convoluted narrative. Zemeckis has said it is his least favorite film in the series. The final film, Part III follows Marty as he travels to 1885 to rescue a time-stranded Doc. While the film fared less well financially than the two earlier films, it was more critically well-received than Part II. A 2018 poll by The Hollywood Reporter of 2,200 people found 71% wanted a Back to the Future sequel, ahead of another Toy Story or Indiana Jones film. Gale has said there will never be a fourth film, likening it to "selling your kids into prostitution". He added a Back to the Future film could never happen without Fox, who could not participate because of the effects of his Parkinson's disease.

An animated television series, Back to the Future, aired on CBS between 1991 and 1992. It follows Doc's and Marty's adventures through various historical periods, intercut with live-action segments featuring Doc (Lloyd), performing science experiments alongside Bill Nye. A short film, Doc Brown Saves the World (2015), celebrated the film's 30th anniversary. Lloyd reprised his role as Doc, who must travel to the future to prevent a nuclear holocaust in 2045. A musical theater production, Back to the Future, debuted in February 2020 at the Manchester Opera House, England, to positive reviews. The musical was written by Gale and Zemeckis, with music written by Silvestri and Glen Ballard. Gale described it as the best way to give fans more Back to the Future without adding to the film series. In 2024, Zemeckis said he was interested in adapting the musical into a movie. Overall, the Back to the Future franchise is considered one of the most successful film franchises in history.

== Works cited ==
- Bierbaum, Tom (February 6, 1990). "Mixed Reviews". Daily Variety. Los Angeles: Penske Media Corporation. p. 78.
- "Compilation Crazy". Amstrad Action. No. 21. Bath, Somerset: Future plc. June 1987. p. 13.
- Gaines, Caseen (2015). We Don't Need Roads: The Making of the Back to the Future Trilogy. New York City: Plume. ISBN 978-0-14-218153-9.
- Klastorin, Michael; Atamaniuk, Randal (2015). Back to the Future: The Ultimate Visual History. New York City: HarperCollins. ISBN 978-0-06-241914-9.
- Ní Fhlainn, Sorcha (2014). "Introduction: It's About Time". The Worlds of Back to the Future: Critical Essays on the Films. Jefferson, North Carolina: McFarland & Company. ISBN 978-0-7864-4400-7.
- Ní Fhlainn, Sorcha (2015). "'There's Something Very Familiar About This': Time Machines, Cultural Tangents and Mastering Time in H.G. Wells' The Time Machine and the Back to the Future Trilogy". Adaptation. 9 (2). Oxford: Oxford University Press. doi:10.1093/adaptation/apv028. ISSN 1755-0637. S2CID 191947372.
- Pourroy, Janine (November 1985). "Backyard Adventures – Spielberg Style". Cinefex. No. 24. United States. ISSN 0198-1056.
- Schneider, Steven Jay (2013). "1980s". 1001 Movies You Must See Before You Die. Boston, Massachusetts: Murdoch Books Pty Limited. ISBN 978-0-7641-6613-6.
- Weinberg, Mark (2018a). "Back To The Future: The Film That Left Us Speechless". Movie Nights With The Reagans. New York City: Simon & Schuster. ISBN 978-1-5011-3399-2. OCLC 1021228142.
