= Roy Price =

American businessman (born 1967 or 1968)

- Born: 1967 or 1968 (age 58–59)
- Education: Harvard University (BA); University of Southern California (JD)
- Occupation: entertainment executive
- Relatives: Frank Price (father)

Roy Price (born 1967) is a former Amazon.com executive. He worked for over 13 years at Amazon, where he founded Amazon Video and Amazon Studios. He was suspended in 2017 over sexual harassment allegations that were never legally charged. He is a former Disney executive and McKinsey consultant.

== Family and education ==
Price has been described as being from "Hollywood royalty." His mother, Katherine Crawford, was an actress known for Riding with Death (1976), A Walk in the Spring Rain (1970) and Gemini Man (1976). His father, Frank Price, held a number of prominent Hollywood executive positions including head of Universal TV in the 1970s; President, and later Chairman and CEO, of Columbia Pictures; and president of Universal Pictures. His maternal grandfather, Roy Huggins, created and produced TV shows like The Fugitive, The Rockford Files and Maverick.

Price graduated from Phillips Academy Andover and Harvard University, and later attended USC Gould School of Law.

== Career ==
From 1989 to 1990 Price worked as a film set assistant, specifically, "third assistant camera" during the Fiji shooting of Return to the Blue Lagoon (1991). From 1990 to 1992, Price worked as a financial analyst at Allen & Company.

From 1993 to 2000, Price was the Vice President of Creative Affairs for Disney TV Animation. Price developed or supervised TV series including Recess (1997), Pepper Ann (1997), Hercules (1998), Timon & Pumbaa (1995), Buzz Lightyear of Star Command (2000), The Weekenders (2000), and Emmy and BAFTA winner Teacher's Pet (2000). Also, several animated films and direct to videos including Recess: School's Out (2001), Tarzan & Jane and Mickey's House of Villains.

After his time with Disney, Price worked as a consultant for McKinsey from 2000–2002, a global management consulting firm that serves a broad mix of private, public and social sector institutions.

From 2003 to 2004, Price operated out of Price Entertainment (his father's studio established in the late 80s) and acted as a business consultant to media companies.

From 2004 to 2009, Price worked as a Group Product manager, director, and Amazon Video on Demand. He launched Amazon Video in 2008 and Amazon Studios in 2010. From 2009–2014, Price also worked as Director of Amazon Video on Demand. From 2014–2017, Price was head of Amazon Studios, and VP for Prime Video.

In 2017, Amazon producer Isa Dick Hackett told The Hollywood Reporter that Price, then the programming chief at Amazon, had sexually harassed her in 2015. Hackett also alleged that Price had failed to take action when another actress, Rose McGowan, told him she was sexually assaulted by producer Harvey Weinstein. After the claims were published, Amazon suspended Price, and on October 17, 2017, he resigned his position at Amazon. About a month after leaving Amazon, Price moved permanently to Hong Kong where he founded an art management and consulting firm called International Art Machine, in November 2017.

Price's career was described as "unconventional", and as "irreverent, puckish and infinitely bolder than most Hollywood execs".
