= List of Back to the Future video games =

This is a list of video games in and connected to the Back to the Future franchise.

== Video games ==
=== Games based directly on the Back to the Future franchise ===
- Back to the Future (1985) – Amstrad CPC, Commodore 64, ZX Spectrum
- Back to the Future (1985) – MSX; released by Pony Canyon
- Back to the Future (1986) – MSX2; released by Pony Canyon
- Back to the Future (1989) – Nintendo Entertainment System; released by LJN; a game with multiple modes of play
- Back to the Future Part II & III (1990) – Nintendo Entertainment System; released by LJN; a side-scrolling adventure game that allowed traveling back and forth between the different time periods from the trilogy as Marty attempts to correct the timeline and get back to the real 1985
- Back to the Future Part II (1990) – Amiga, Amstrad CPC, Atari ST, Commodore 64, MS-DOS, ZX Spectrum, Master System
- Back to the Future Part III (1991) – Amiga, Amstrad CPC, Atari ST, Commodore 64, MS-DOS, ZX Spectrum, Genesis, Master System
- Back to the Future (1991) - Tiger Electronics handheld LCD video game based on the Back to the Future cartoon series
- Super Back to the Future II (1993) – Super Famicom (Japan-only release); a 2D side-scroller in which the player controls Marty on the hoverboard while he battles enemies
- Back to the Future: Blitz Through Time (2010) – Facebook; Flash game to promote Back to the Future: The Game.
- Back to the Future: The Game (2010–2011) – Windows, macOS, PlayStation 3, 4, Wii, iOS, Xbox 360, Xbox One; Telltale Games produced episodic video games based on the franchise. The game was released as five episodes, with Christopher Lloyd reprising his role as Emmett "Doc" Brown, Claudia Wells reprising her role as Jennifer Parker, and Michael J. Fox making two cameo appearances. A.J. LoCascio provided the voice for Marty McFly and Bob Gale assisted with the script. Thomas Wilson reprises his role as Biff Tannen in the game's 2015 collector's edition re-release.

=== Games which contain licensed Back to the Future subcontent ===
- Funko Fusion includes Marty McFly and Emmett "Doc" Brown.
- Hot Wheels Unleashed has the DeLorean Time Machine as an unlockable car.
- Jetpack Joyride released a Back to the Future-themed downloadable content pack with outfits, vehicles, and levels.
- Lego Dimensions (2015) – PlayStation 3 and 4 / Wii U / Xbox 360 and One; released by WB Games, features playable Marty and Doc, along with other Back to the Future themed content. Michael J. Fox and Christopher Lloyd reprise their respective roles as Marty McFly and Emmett "Doc" Brown.
- Planet Coaster: Back to the Future Time Machine Construction Kit (2017) – Windows / PlayStation 4 and 5 / Xbox One and Series X/S / macOS; paid downloadable content that includes in-game replicas of the DeLorean time machine in its original 1985 form, and in its 2015, 1955 and 1885 variants, with optional standard tires, hover wheels, whitewall tires, or railway wheels. Time machine-themed go karts are also added for use in the game's kart-racing tracks.
- PowerWash Simulator (2022) — Nintendo Switch / PlayStation 4 and 5 / Windows / Xbox One and Series X/S; released by Square Enix, released a "Back to the Future Special Pack" as downloadable content on November 16, 2023, in which the player is hired to clean the sets and props during production of the film trilogy.
- Rocket League released a DLC pack which adds the DeLorean time machine to the game's selection of vehicles.
- Universal Studios Theme Parks Adventure (2001) – GameCube; released by Kemco, includes a level based on Back to the Future: The Ride.
- Forza Horizon 5 includes the three versions of the DeLorean time machine as part of the "Universal Icons Car Pack" DLC.
- Fortnite has a Marty McFly and releated cosmetic items in the Chapter 7 Season 1 Battle Pass.

== Pinball ==
- Back to the Future: The Pinball (1990) – released by Data East Pinball, designed by Joe Kaminkow and Ed Cebula, with music by Brian L. Schmidt; a pinball game based on the trilogy that features three songs that were featured in the movies: "The Power of Love" and "Back in Time" (originally performed by Huey Lewis and the News), and "Doubleback" (originally performed by ZZ Top).
- Back to the Future Pinball (2017) – a virtual pinball adaptation of the film trilogy, developed and released by Zen Studios as one of a set of three add-on tables for Pinball FX 3 that are based on major Universal Pictures film properties. This table behaves differently than the Data East version and features 3-D animated figures and visual effects that are impossible to reproduce on a physical table. This table was remastered for Pinball FX on March 31, 2022.

== Gambling ==
- Back to the Future Video Slots (2006) – released by International Game Technology
- Back to the Future Back in Time Video Slots (2013) – released by International Game Technology
