= Rachel Maddux =

American author

Rachel Maddux, ca. 1938

Rachel Maddux and Ingrid Bergman, ca. 1969

Rachel Maddux (1912 - 1983) was an American author and screenwriter. She was born on December 12, 1912, in Wichita, Kansas, married King Baker in 1941, and died on November 19, 1983, in Erin, Tennessee. She attended the University of Wichita and graduated from Kansas University in 1934, with a degree in zoology. She began attending medical school, but had to withdraw for health reasons.

Her first story, the novella "Turnip's Blood", was published by Story magazine in 1936. The New York Times reported in 1937 that Katharine Hepburn had bought the rights to the piece. Maddux rewrote the story as "Girl in the Park" for the October 30, 1952 episode of The Ford Television Theatre. She went on to write the fantasy novel The Green Kingdom (1957), the roman a clef Abel's Daughter (1960), and another novella, A Walk in the Spring Rain (1966), which was published in German as Die Frau des Anderen (1970). A Walk in the Spring Rain was made into a 1970 movie of the same name, with Ingrid Bergman and Anthony Quinn, written and produced by Stirling Silliphant. Neil D. Isaacs wrote about that process in Fiction Into Film (1970).

In the 1950s, Maddux had stories published in several issues of The Magazine of Fantasy and Science Fiction, including "Final Clearance" (1956) and "Overture and Beginners" (1957). She wrote a "mental" (thematic) autobiography in 1941, published in 1991 as Communication, and a collection of 28 of her stories, The Way Things Are, was published posthumously in 1992.

In 1960, Maddux and her husband moved to Erin, Tennessee. While there, they became involved in fostering two abandoned siblings, and had to deal with the "misplaced pride" of the family and local residents when they tried (unsuccessfully) to adopt the children. Maddux wrote the book The Orchard Children (1977) and the television movie "Who'll Save Our Children?" (1978) about the experience. Her home in Erin was named a Literary Landmark by the American Library Association in 1998.

== Bibliography ==
- "Turnip's Blood", 1936, in Story: The Magazine of the Short Story, December.
- "Turnip's Blood", 1938, 44 pages, in The Flying Yorkshireman (collection of 5 novellas), Harper & Brothers Publishers, New York.
- The Green Kingdom, 1957, 561 pages, Simon & Schuster, New York.
- Abel's Daughter, 1960, 184 pages, Harper & Brothers, New York.
- A Walk in the Spring Rain, 1966, 89 pages, Doubleday & Company, New York.
- The Orchard Children, (non-fiction), 1977.
- "A Walk in the Spring Rain", part of Fiction Into Film, Neil D. Isaacs, 1970, The University of Tennessee Press, Knoxville.
- Communication (autobiography; includes "Turnip's Blood"), 1991, 102 pages, The University of Tennessee Press, Knoxville.
- The Way Things Are, 1992, (28 short stories, written between 1936 and 1960), The University of Tennessee Press, Knoxville.
