= Frank Price =

American television writer and executive (1930–2025)

- Price c. 1980s
- Born: William Francis Price Jr. May 17, 1930; Decatur, Illinois, U.S.
- Died: August 25, 2025 (aged 95); Santa Monica, California, U.S.
- Occupations: Hollywood studio head; script writer; editor
- Years active: 1951–2001
- Employers: Universal Television; Universal Studios; Columbia Pictures
- Spouses: Barbara Christensen (divorced); Phyllis Hull (divorced); Katherine Crawford (m. 1965)
- Children: 5, including Roy

William Francis Price Jr. (May 17, 1930 – August 25, 2025) was an American television writer and film studio executive. He held a number of executive positions including head of Universal TV; president, and later chairman and CEO, of Columbia Pictures; and president of Universal Pictures. He is credited with helping in the 1960s to develop the "made-for-TV movie" and the 90-minute miniseries television format, including The Virginian (1962–1970).

As a studio president, Price oversaw the production of or greenlit famous films of the 1980s including Out of Africa, which won the Academy Award for Best Picture in 1985, Tootsie (1982), Gandhi (1982) and The Karate Kid (1984). He greenlit Howard the Duck (1986), which became one of the worst flops in film history and caused him to resign from Universal. Price saved from obscurity the script for Back to the Future (1985), and made the decision to film other long-shots that became blockbusters including Boyz n the Hood (1991) and Ghostbusters (1984). As of 1990 he had been in charge of turning out nine of the ten top-grossing films in Columbia's history.

== Early life ==
William Francis Price Jr. was born to William Francis Price and Winnifred A. (Moran) Price on May 17, 1930, in Decatur, Illinois. During the Great Depression, his father moved continually in search of work; prior to college Price lived in eight cities around the country. He attended three years of high school in Flint, Michigan, and spent five years in Glendale, California, where his mother worked as a waitress in the cafeteria of Warner Bros., exposing the young Price to a film studio and actors. At the time of his death he still had photographs of Errol Flynn, Humphrey Bogart, Olivia de Havilland and James Cagney inscribed "To Frankie".

Price served in the United States Navy during 1948 to 1949, then attended three years of college at Michigan State University from 1949 to 1951 before transferring to Columbia University on the strength of his writing talent. In New York he dropped out of university to work full-time as a reader in the CBS-TV Story Department.

== Career ==
=== Television (1951–1978) ===
Price was a story editor and writer for CBS-TV in New York from 1951 to 1953 where he worked on series such as Westinghouse Studio One, Suspense and The Web. He moved to Los Angeles where he was story editor at Columbia Pictures from 1953 to 1957, working on shows like Ford Theater, Father Knows Best, Damon Runyon Theater, Playhouse 90 and Circus Boy. In 1957, he was story editor of NBC's Emmy Award-winning Matinee Theater. In 1958–1959 he worked for Ziv Television Programs including on the western The Rough Riders.

In 1959, Price joined Universal TV (then Revue Productions) as associate producer and writer where he was mentored by Sidney Sheinberg and Lew Wasserman. In 1961, he made the transition from artist to studio executive when he was named vice president of Universal TV, and in 1971 senior vice president. The same year, he was named president and head of Universal TV and vice president, MCA, Inc. During his time at Universal he is credited with helping to develop new television formats the "made-for-TV movie" and the miniseries. He was executive producer of the TV series, The Virginian (1962–70), TV's first 90-minute Western series. Price said "The Virginian played a formative role in my life. I got on-the-job experience running a high-profile show business enterprise, learning to coordinate business and creative endeavors." In 1966, he produced one of the first movies made for television, The Doomsday Flight. Other shows he developed or supervised included The Six Million Dollar Man, Battlestar Galactica, The Rockford Files, Kojak and Columbo.

=== Columbia Pictures (1978–1983) ===
Whenever I felt overly stressed, I reminded myself that it's easier than writing. It's "let's put on a show" ... and getting paid to do it.

In 1978, after a 19-year career in television, Price left Universal to become president of Columbia Pictures. "When I left Universal, I didn't know if I could ever become president of Columbia," he once said, "but I didn't want to wake up at the age of 65 and not have taken that chance to run a movie studio." Over the next five years, Price greenlit a string of risky but highly successful films including Kramer vs. Kramer (1979), Tootsie (1982), Gandhi (1982), and The Karate Kid (1984). For Ghostbusters (1984), "The wisdom in town was that I had made a terrible mistake," Price said, "When the film came on, the reaction was horrible. A studio executive came up and put his arm around me and said, 'Don't worry: we all make mistakes.' I was nauseous ... [but] when the movie came out, it just exploded."

During Price's tenure, the studio put Steven Spielberg's proposed follow up to Close Encounters of the Third Kind, Night Skies, into turnaround. The project eventually became the highest-grossing film of all-time, E.T. the Extra-Terrestrial. Columbia received a share of the profits for its involvement in the development.

After Columbia was purchased by The Coca-Cola Company in January 1982, Price lost out in a power struggle with Francis T. Vincent, chairman of Columbia Pictures Industries, over how to position Columbia in the new pay-cable TV market. In October 1983, Price resigned from Columbia. In hindsight Columbia would regret the decision – in 1990, Alan J. Levine, then President of Columbia, noted during Price's tenure he was responsible for turning out nine of the top ten grossing films in Columbia's history.

=== Universal Pictures (1983–1986) ===
In November 1983, Price became chairman of the MCA Motion Picture Group, which included control of the production and distribution of Universal Pictures. He is credited with saving the script for Back to the Future (1985) from obscurity, allowing the film to be completed. He greenlit Out of Africa, which won the best-picture Oscar in 1985. However, in September 1986, Price quit Universal in fallout over the notorious flop of Howard the Duck. In 2014, the Los Angeles Times listed Howard the Duck as one of the costliest box-office flops of all time. "A duck brought Price down," lamented one producer.

Of his time at Universal, one industry insider said "Price had full carte blanche to put anything into the works at whatever cost. Frank did what he did at Columbia: He bought the big talent. In effect, he was spending a lot of money in an attempt to play it safe."

=== Columbia Pictures (1990–1991) and independent ===
In 1987, Price formed his own studio Price Entertainment. The company was initially set up in 1986 with a first-look production deal at Tri-Star Pictures. The company had officially established in late November 1987 as an auxiliary production arm of Tri-Star Pictures after a longer-established move, and the company had fit into the scheme at the then-pending merger with the Coca-Cola Entertainment Business Sector into Columbia Pictures Entertainment that the joint venture relationship was transferred to Columbia Pictures once the deal was finalized. In 1990, after Sony purchased Columbia Pictures, Price was approached to return to Columbia and after a series of short negotiations he was appointed chairman of Columbia Pictures. His company Price Entertainment, Inc. was merged with Columbia in March 1991 with the agreement it would turn out two films a year, produced by Price but without being credited to him.

During his time at Columbia he greenlit Boyz n the Hood (1991), The Prince of Tides (1991), Bram Stoker's Dracula (1992) and Groundhog Day (1993). On being a studio chief, Price considered it one of the world's great jobs:

... the best part of the job was the ability to buy the best – directors, scripts, talent. The worst was spending your day saying "no" – telling people you don't share their dreams. You're making subjective decisions in a very amorphous realm ... and have to wait 18 to 24 months before you know if you guessed right. Anyone who complains about the stresses is a fool. The pay and the perks are good. You have fun lunches with Streisand and Redford. And it's sort of like being head of a small country. Though I rarely used the plane, I was met at the airport and commanded a certain amount of deference. Things go your way – period.

Price left Columbia on October 4, 1991, at which time Price Entertainment was re-activated and continued an association with Sony Pictures Entertainment with a non-exclusive production deal. Price Entertainment continued making pictures until 2001 including Shadowlands (1993), Circle of Friends (1995) and The Tuskegee Airmen (1995).

== Other work ==
Price was chairman of the Board of Councilors for the USC School of Cinema-Television since its inception in 1992, where he assembled a board that included Steven Spielberg, George Lucas, Robert Zemeckis, David Geffen, among others. Price said the board helps with the school's teaching mission and fund raising, and "it takes an amount of time trying to make sure that's a top school," he said. "And I think it is." He retired from the board in 2021. Price was on the Board of Trustees of the University of Southern California since 1996. In 2022, USC awarded him an honorary degree.

== Industry reflections ==
Price came from the artistic side of the industry, starting out as a script writer. He considered this an advantage later when deciding to make a film, saying "Unwilling to base my decisions on other people's perceptions, I spent a lot of my time reading [scripts]. From what I understand, however, that's the exception rather than the rule." Price was also a serious reader; after his 1987 departure from Universal he devoured books ranging from Das Kapital to Adam Smith's The Wealth of Nations. Price worked on a novel of his own (never published), he said it was "my version of The Last Tycoon", an unfinished novel by F. Scott Fitzgerald about the life of a Hollywood studio manager. "I know that world better than F. Scott Fitzgerald," Price said. "This is a business like no other. Though there may not be any more politics and infighting in Hollywood than elsewhere, the stakes are so much higher. One bad casting decision can ruin a picture."

== Personal life and death ==
Price's first "marriage" was while he was still a teenager, to Barbara Christensen; it ended in annulment (it was never legal). The couple had a son born January 13, 1949, who they put up for adoption, and he was raised as Mike Damitz; Price reunited with him in 2018, and they remained close until Damitz's death in 2024 at the age of 75. He then married Phyllis Hull, with whom he had two sons: Steve Price (deceased 2024), who worked with his father in film production, and David Price, who directed films such as Children of the Corn II: The Final Sacrifice.

After that marriage ended in divorce, Price married Katherine Crawford on May 15, 1965, an actress known for Riding with Death (1976), A Walk in the Spring Rain (1970) and Gemini Man (1976). She starred in The Alfred Hitchcock Hour (1963 – Season 1 Episode 28: "Last Seen in Blue Jeans") as Loren Saunders and also was guest star in an early episode of The Man from U.N.C.L.E. Her father was Roy Huggins, who created and produced TV shows like The Fugitive, The Rockford Files and Maverick. Price and Katherine had two sons, including Roy Price, a former Amazon Studios executive. The couple remained married for 60 years, until Frank’s death.

Price died in his sleep of natural causes at his home in Santa Monica, California, on August 25, 2025, at the age of 95.
