= Super Back to the Future II =

1993 video game

- Japanese box art
- Developer: Daft
- Publisher: Toshiba EMI
- Programmer: Puppet Ishizuka
- Artist: Endorphin Konappy
- Composer: Hitoshi Sakimoto
- Series: Back to the Future
- Platform: Super Famicom
- Release: JP: July 23, 1993
- Genre: Platformer
- Mode: Single-player

Super Back to the Future II (Note: Japanese: スーパー・バック・トゥ・ザ・フューチャーII, Hepburn: Sūpā Bakku Tu Za Fyūchā Tsū) is a 2D side-scrolling platformer video game developed by Daft and published by Toshiba EMI in Japan exclusively on July 23, 1993 for the Super Famicom. It is based on the film Back to the Future Part II, featuring elements from it, including the plot of protagonist Marty McFly attempting to prevent antagonist Biff Tannen from getting rich using a sports almanac from the future. The gameplay involves Marty using a hoverboard at all times, spin attacking and bouncing off enemies with it.

Super Back to the Future II uses a super deformed art style, designed by Endorphin Konappy, which differs from the film's realistic style. The soundtrack was based on the film's and was composed by Hitoshi Sakimoto. It began as a role-playing video game with a design similar to The Legend of Zelda, but was changed to be a platforming game at some point during development.

The game has received mixed reception. Despite critics considering it among the better Back to the Future games, it was criticized for controls issues, slowdown, and the screen being too zoomed in, which multiple critics stated punished players for moving too quickly in the game. The art style has received more positive reception. It is considered a curio due to multiple factors, including being an adaption of a four-year-old film at the time.

== Gameplay ==
Super Back to the Future II is a 2D side-scrolling platformer starring Marty McFly. It takes place during multiple time periods, including 1955, 1985, and 2015, and Marty is tasked with using a time-traveling DMC DeLorean to travel between these time periods, his goal being to find a sports almanac that antagonist Biff Tannen gets from the future to get rich in 1985.

Whenever the player is in control of Marty, he is riding on a hoverboard, only dismounting at the end of the stage. The player can use the hoverboard to attack enemies, including jumping on their heads and doing a spinning attack. These enemies include police officers, robots, Griff Tannen, and Biff Tannen, the latter two serving as boss fights. Enemies and obstacles can damage Marty, who can take three hits before losing a life. Each level has coins the player can collect, which can be used to purchase power-ups, health, and extra lives from vending machines. Some walls have spots that allow the player to jump up with the hoverboard. The player can also increase Marty's hoverboard speed using a button. The levels have ramps that the player can jump off of, as well as bonuses they can collect.

== Development and release ==
Super Back to the Future II is a Super Famicom adaptation of the film Back to the Future Part II developed by Daft, released four years after the film's release. It was originally intended to be a role-playing video game with a design similar to The Legend of Zelda series, given the tentative title of Back to the Future 2. It was programmed by Puppet Ishizuka, and its graphics were designed by Endorphin Konappy. The game uses an anime art style with chibi character designs. The soundtrack was composed by Hitoshi Sakamoto, who used an orchestral style for the first time in it and two other titles. His work on this and Dragon Quest VI would lead to him incorporating a leitmotif to define the whole score in future titles. The soundtrack is based on the film's soundtrack.

Super Back to the Future II was published exclusively in Japan on July 23, 1993, by Toshiba EMI. There were rumors of an English release in the third quarter of 1993, but they did not materialize. An English fan translation was created by a user called mteam. It was the last Back to the Future video game released until Back to the Future: The Game in 2010.

== Reception ==
Super Back to the Future II received generally mixed reception. Super Back to the Future II is regarded as a standout entry in the Back to the Future video game series, with Destructoid writer Allistair Pinsof believing that the only other highlight was Back to the Future: The Game by Telltale Games. He described it as miraculous that Super Back to the Future II was so much better than previous entries. Den of Geek Aaron Birch agreed that it was a series highlight, finding its implementation of Back to the Future elements "cohesive and enjoyable." He believed that the comparative quality of the game was due to the developer avoiding being too strict in adapting Back to the Future while "clearly set[ting] out to make a real game." Fellow Den of Geek writer Matthew Byrd considered it among the strangest Super Nintendo games due to it being released so much later than the film and being "objectively better" than other Back to the Future games before it. Super Play writer Jonathan Davies questioned why it was an adaptation of the second film instead of the first or third, also finding the anime art style strange. The magazine later considered it an example of a poor licensed video game. Nerdist writer Robert Workman felt that it was reflective of the low quality of Back to the Future games in general, speculating that its middling reception contributed to it not leaving Japan. Diehard GameFan writer Magilla felt that the game lacked redeeming qualities, suggesting that the developer did not care how good the game was, only about using the license to sell copies.

The game's chibi art style was the subject of praise from critics.

Its visuals have been considered a highlight of the game, to the point that critics like Katya Tonechkina of Страна игр believed that it was worth playing for on its own. Author Christopher Carton believed that the story of Back to the Future Part II was better represented than the other films in previous Back to the Future games. He praised the character designs and color palettes, finding the cutscenes enjoyable and wishing it came out in English. Aaron Birch praised the developer for capturing Back to the Future visually, including the protagonist and settings from Back to the Future Part II. Despite identifying it as more cartoony than the film, NF Magazine writer David Oxford felt that it was better off for it.

Despite being considered better than past entries, it received criticism for its gameplay and controls. Allistair Pinsof felt that it was of average quality, though that its short length and nostalgia factor was appealing enough to try. He enjoyed the hoverboard mechanic, but believed that it was not designed for it, stating that the zoomed in camera combined with Marty's movement speed made him stop to wait for the screen to move. He felt that this felt like a limitation one might find in a Game Boy game. Jonathan Davies felt that the gameplay was limited and levels too empty, further criticizing the controls for being unreliable. Despite enjoying the art style and soundtrack, Robert Workman found the gameplay "too loose" and graphics laggy and glitchy. Magilla also criticized its performance, stating that it was below 8-bit console standards due to how easily it begins to slow down even with few objects on screen. Hardcore Gamer Magazine writer Sardius felt that, despite feeling more like a real video game than other Back to the Future games, he considered it a poor game, also criticizing the game's performance. Superjuegos staff felt that it failed to reach "quality limits" alongside other games they published, resulting in its publisher not establishing itself as a major game publisher.

Some critics were more positive, with David Oxford feeling that, while it was not "spectacular," it was at least "remarkably decent." The staff of Super Control had mixed feelings on the game; Allie found it enjoyable despite collision issues, a lack of incentive to explore, and scrolling that makes the game slow down, while Paul found it sluggish and dated compared to Super Nintendo games like Super Mario All-Stars. Jools agreed with Allie about scrolling issues, comparing it to the series Bubsy, which he believed similarly encouraged players to move quickly but punished them with obstacles that are difficult to avoid.
