= Back to the Future: The Pinball =

1990 pinball machine

- Manufacturer: Data East
- Release date: June 1990
- System: Data East Version 3
- Players: 4
- Design: Joe Kaminkow; Ed Cebula
- Programming: Rehman Merchant
- Artwork: Paul Faris
- Music: Brian Schmidt
- Sound: Brian Schmidt
- Voices: Fred Young; Thomas F. Wilson
- Production run: 3,000

Back to the Future: The Pinball is a 1990 pinball machine designed by Joe Kaminkow, Ed Cebula and released by Data East, based on the film trilogy.

== Background ==
The game was designed and built in only six weeks.

Released a month after the third movie's theatrical run, concluding the trilogy, the game featured the four songs The Power of Love, Back in Time, Doubleback and Alan Silvestri's orchestral theme, aside from its gameplay (following the storyline of the three films) and score.

Michael J. Fox refused to permit his image to be used to adorn the back glass of the game, so the replacement image of his character Marty McFly wearing sunglasses on the game's backglass and playfield was portrayed by Brad Faris, son of Data East pinball artwork designer Paul Faris.

Joe Kaminkow, one of the pinball game designers, also appeared as Fox's character on the advertising flyer and Gary Stern, former president of Data East Pinball and current CEO of Stern Pinball, was in Christopher Lloyd's role as Doc Brown in the flyer as well.

Back to the Future: The Pinball is also significant because it was one of the final mass production Data East pinballs made using a numeric display. In 1991, games would have a "Dot Matrix Display" beginning with Checkpoint.

== Gameplay ==
The game includes a twin jackpots feature.

== Release and reception ==
Several Back to the Future: The Pinball games were available to play at the premiere party for Back to the Future Part III in Los Angeles.

== See also ==
- List of Back to the Future video games
