= A Walk in the Spring Rain =

1970 film by Guy Green

- Ingrid Bergman and Anthony Quinn in A Walk in the Spring Rain
- Directed by: Guy Green
- Written by: Stirling Silliphant
- Based on: A Walk in the Spring Rain; 1966 novel by Rachel Maddux
- Produced by: Stirling Silliphant
- Starring: Anthony Quinn; Ingrid Bergman
- Cinematography: Charles Lang
- Edited by: Ferris Webster
- Music by: Elmer Bernstein; Don Black
- Distributed by: Columbia Pictures
- Release date: April 9, 1970 (Knoxville)
- Running time: 98 minutes
- Country: United States
- Language: English

A Walk in the Spring Rain is a 1970 American romantic drama film in Eastmancolor made by Columbia Pictures, directed by Guy Green and produced by Stirling Silliphant, from his own screenplay based on the novel by Rachel Maddux. Outside location scenes were filmed in New York City, the Great Smoky Mountains National Park, Gatlinburg, Tennessee and Knoxville, Tennessee.

The film stars Ingrid Bergman and Anthony Quinn, with Fritz Weaver, Katherine Crawford, and Virginia Gregg. The music score was by Elmer Bernstein and the cinematography by Charles Lang. Martial arts superstar Bruce Lee, a personal friend of producer Stirling Silliphant, choreographed the fight between Will Cade (Anthony Quinn) and his son.

== Plot ==
Libby Meredith and her law-professor husband, Roger, 52, move from New York to a small house in the Tennessee backwoods during a snowy winter. Their married neighbor, Will Cade, is attracted to Libby and very helpful and friendly to them. While her intellectual husband is busy writing a book, Libby comes to like the country life and finds herself attracted to Will's rural sensibilities, culminating in a brief affair.

Libby is surprised when her daughter, Ellen, arrives to ask them to return to New York so Libby can help raise grandson Bucky while Ellen attends Harvard Law School. Will's erratic son, who had seen his father and Libby embracing in the woods, molests her when she is out walking. Will rescues her but accidentally kills his son in rescuing her from his clutches. After attending the funeral, the disillusioned Merediths decide to return to New York because they have drifted apart, Roger has failed to finish his book, and Ellen needs Libby for Bucky. When Libby bids the Cades goodbye, he follows her for a private conversation and says he will wait for her to return, but she says she no longer believes in miracles. The last scene, very similar to the first one, shows Libby wearing the same clothes and picking up Bucky from school, and part of the song "A Walk in the Spring Rain" plays over the end credits.

== Cast ==
- Anthony Quinn as Will Cade
- Ingrid Bergman as Libby Meredith
- Fritz Weaver as Roger Meredith
- Katherine Crawford as Ellen Meredith
- Tom Holland as Boy (as Tom Fielding)
- Virginia Gregg as Ann Cade
- Mitchell Silberman as Bucky
- Janet Nelson Chadwick as Singer at Festival (segment "Oh Shenandoah")

== Production ==
Writer-producer Stirling Silliphant heard about Bergman's interest in the 1966 Rachel Maddux novel, A Walk in the Spring Rain, and she joined the project. It was her first American film in more than 20 years. Silliphant and would-be director Kevin Billington had a creative disagreement, and Guy Green directed. Green said he made it to work with the stars.

Production was slated for West Virginia, but was moved to the Tennessee part of the Great Smoky Mountains and the national park, primarily the Cades Cove area. Some filming was done in nearby Knoxville and in Gatlinburg, which borders the park; the Merediths spend a weekend at the Gatlinburg Motor Inn (now The Gatlinburg Inn) on Parkway and do some shopping along the street. Rehearsals began in April 1968, and principal photography started in April 1969. It moved to New York City in May or early June and was delayed a day when thieves stole $250,000 worth of equipment. Replacement gear was brought in from Los Angeles.

== Release ==
The world premiere was held April 9, 1970 at the Capri 70 theatre, as part of Knoxville's annual Dogwood Arts Festival. It grossed $17,561 in its opening week, a Knoxville record, and expanded into other theaters in the South East of the United States. "Critical reception was largely negative, and the film proved to be a commercial failure," according to the American Film Institute Catalog of Feature Films. A book, Fiction Into Film: A Walk in the Spring Rain, was published in 1970 by the University of Tennessee Press. It included Maddux's novel, Silliphant's screenplay, and commentary by Neil D. Isaacs "on the fashioning of the script and various stages of production," according to Variety.

== See also ==
- List of American films of 1970
