= Polyester fiberfill =

Synthetic fiber used for stuffing

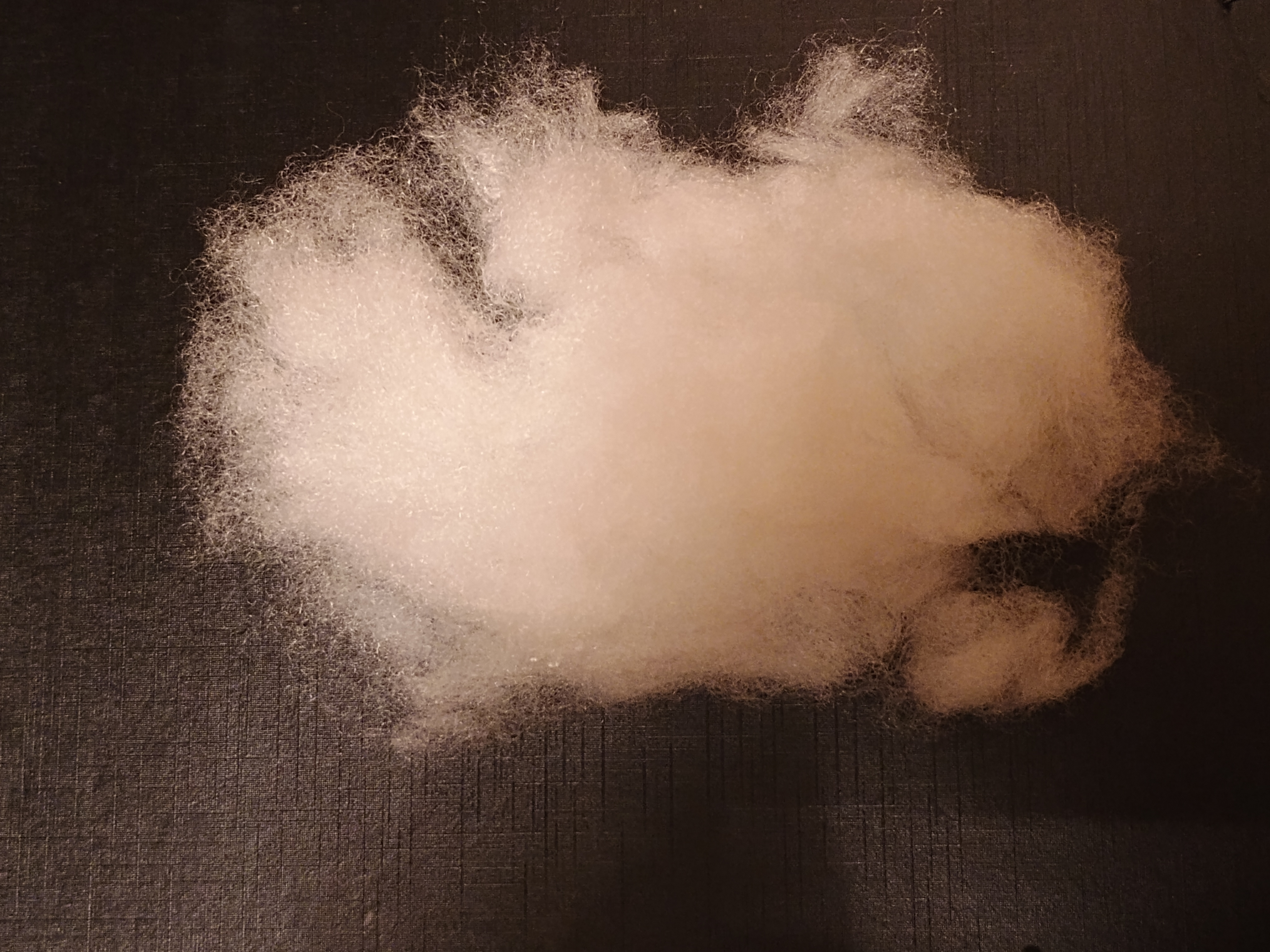
A small amount of polyfill.

Polyester fiberfill is a synthetic fiber used for stuffing pillows and other soft objects such as stuffed animals. It is also used in audio speakers for its acoustic properties. It is commonly sold under the trademark name Poly-Fil, or un-trademarked as polyfill.
