= Michael Strøm Lie =

Norwegian diplomat (1862–1934)

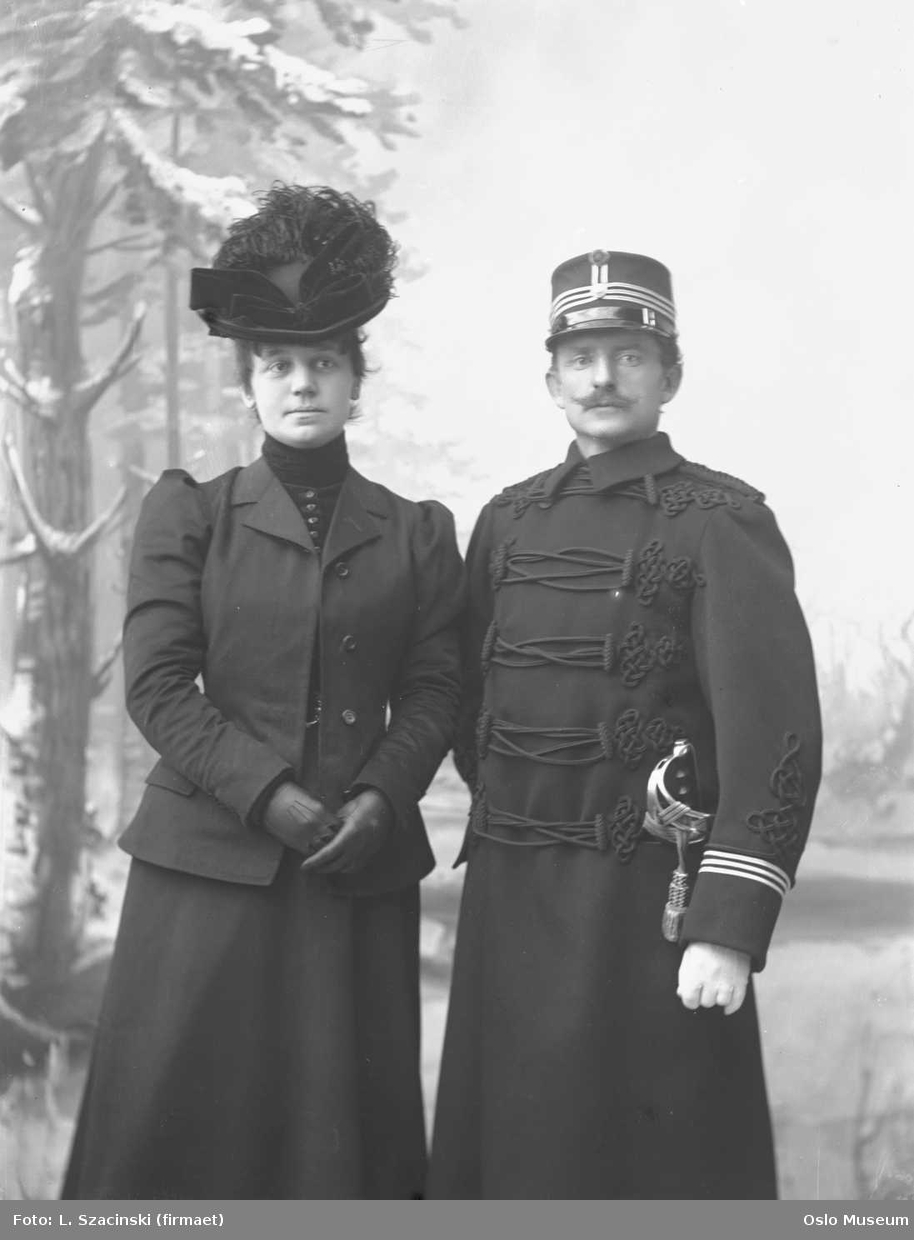
Michael Strøm Lie to the right. Unknown other person, but possibly his wife Annie Maggie Plahte (1863–1955; married 1897). Photo from about 1895.

Michael Strøm Lie (20 December 1862 – 9 July 1934) was a Norwegian diplomat.

He was born in Kongsvinger as a son of the cousins, writer Jonas Lie (1833–1908) and Thomasine Henriette Lie (1833–1907). He was a brother of Erik Lie and writer Mons Lie, and through the former an uncle of Nazi Jonas Lie. On the maternal side he was a nephew of Erika (Nissen) and Ida Lie, and a first cousin of Erika Lie, Karl Nissen, painter Jonas Lie and Eyolf Soot and a first cousin once removed of Botten Soot. On the paternal side he was a first cousin of Bernt Lie and Vilhelm Lie, and a first cousin once removed of Emil Lie and Nils Lie. He was married to Maggie Skredsvig, ex-wife of Christian Skredsvig and daughter of Frithjof M. Plahte, who in turn was a first cousin of Michael's mother.

He was named as military attaché in Berlin in 1904. When Norway became independent in 1905 he became acting chargé d'affaires. In 1906 he was promoted to counsellor at the legation, and he was later the Norwegian ambassador to Mexico and Cuba from 1910 to 1921, Italy briefly in 1921 and Spain from 1921 to 1927. He issued the memoirs Fra mit liv som diplomat in 1929.
