= Mons Lie (writer) =

Norwegian writer

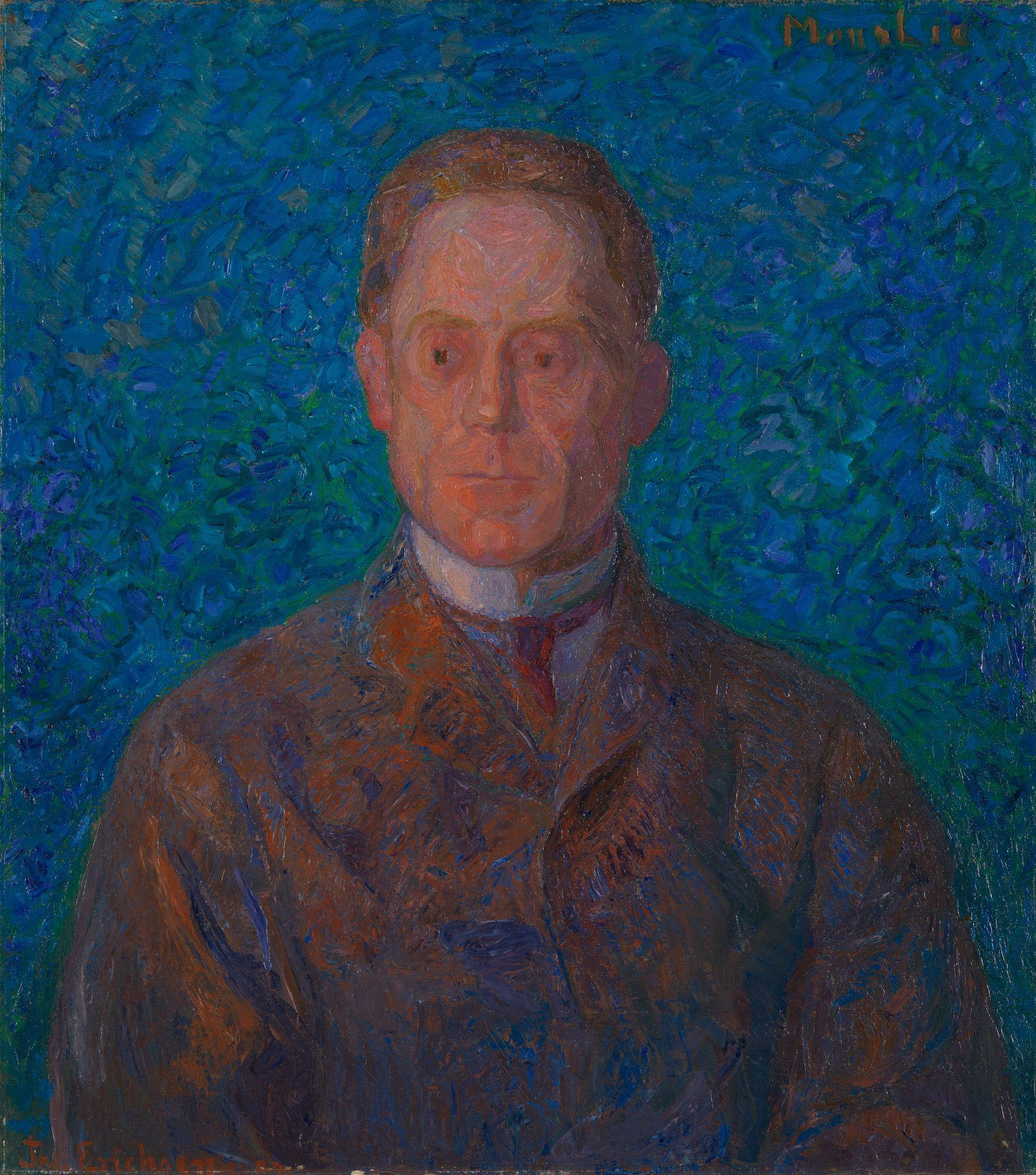

Mons Lie (5 May 1864 – 1931) was a Norwegian writer.

He was born in Kongsvinger as a son of the cousins, writer Jonas Lie (1833–1908) and Thomasine Henriette Lie (1833–1907). He was a brother of Michael Strøm Lie and writer Erik Lie, and through the latter an uncle of Nazi Jonas Lie. On the maternal side he was a nephew of Erika (Nissen) and Ida Lie, and a first cousin of Erika Lie, Karl Nissen, painter Jonas Lie and Eyolf Soot and a first cousin once removed of Botten Soot. On the paternal side he was a first cousin of Bernt Lie and Vilhelm Lie, and a first cousin once removed of Emil Lie and Nils Lie.

His literary debut was Streif in 1894, and he wrote novels, short stories, poems and plays. The novel Man Overboard (1904) is regarded as his best work.
