= Erik Lie (writer) =

Norwegian writer

Erik Røring Møinichen Lie (23 November 1869 – 1943) was a Norwegian writer.

He was born in Kristiania as the youngest son of the cousins, writer Jonas Lie (1833–1908) and Thomasine Henriette Lie (1833–1907). He was a brother of Michael Strøm Lie and writer Mons Lie. On the maternal side he was a nephew of Erika (Nissen) and Ida Lie, and a first cousin of Erika Lie, Karl Nissen, painter Jonas Lie and Eyolf Soot and a first cousin once removed of Botten Soot. On the paternal side he was a first cousin of Bernt Lie and Vilhelm Lie, and a first cousin once removed of Emil Lie and Nils Lie. Together with Kathrine Elisabeth Dons (1876–1947) he was the father of writer, police officer and Nazi politician Jonas Lie. Through his wife Erik Lie was also an uncle of Helge Thiis and Ragna Thiis Stang.

Erik Lie wrote both fiction: Tolv procent (1902), Direktør Lyngs hjem (1903) and Den nye lykke (1911); and non-fiction. He wrote literary historic books such as Honoré de Balzac (1893) and Den europæiske litteratur i kulturhistoriske billeder (1896), and the more biographical Jonas Lie; oplevelser (1908), Arne Garborg (1914) and Erindringer fra et dikterhjem (1928). He has been credited with taking the initiative to found the Norwegian Authors' Union in 1893. From 1901 to 1905 he was a librarian at the Bibliothèque Nordique in Paris, a part of the Bibliothèque Sainte-Geneviève.
