= Vilhelm Lie =

Norwegian civil servant

Vilhelm Gabriel Heiberg Lie (1877–1935) was a Norwegian civil servant.

He was a son of Emil Bernhard Lie (1836–1891), a brother of Bernt Lie and a nephew of writer Jonas Lie. His father was a first cousin of Erika (Nissen) and Ida Lie, and so Vilhelm was a second cousin of the children in the next generation; Erika Lie, Karl Nissen, Michael Strøm Lie, Mons Lie, Erik Lie, painter Jonas Lie, and Eyolf Soot.

Together with Anna Benedicte Aars Nicolaysen (1880–1965) he had the son Nils Aars Nicolaysen Lie, a notable writer. His son was a first cousin of Emil Lie, a second cousin of the Nazi Jonas Lie, and father of professor of medicine Mons Lie.

Vilhelm Lie took the cand.jur. degree in 1899. He was a tax collector in Bergen from 1914 to 1919, and from 1920 to 1921 he was the State Conciliator of Norway. In 1921 he was hired as chief financial officer (Norwegian: finansborgermester) in Bergen city.

Civic offices
Preceded by Jens Michael Lund	State Conciliator of Norway; 1920–1921	Succeeded by Paul Ivar Paulsen
