= Bernt Lie =

Norwegian novelist (1868–1916)

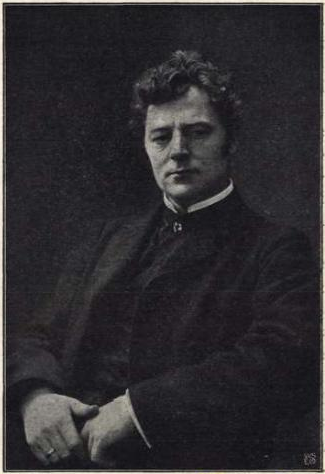

Bernt Bessesen Lie (13 July 1868 – 14 July 1916) was a Norwegian novelist.

He was born on 13 July 1868, in Mandal, a son of stipendiary magistrate Emil Bernhard Lie (1836–1891) and Nicoline Bessesen. Through his sister Ida, he was the brother-in-law of Gjert Lindebrække and an uncle of Sjur Lindebrække and Tikken Manus. Through his brother Vilhelm Lie he was an uncle of Nils Lie. Through his father's brother, writer Jonas Lie he was a first cousin of Michael Strøm Lie, writers Mons Lie and Erik Lie, and a first cousin once removed of Erik's son, the Nazi Jonas Lie. He was a second cousin of Erika Lie, Karl Nissen, painter Jonas Lie and Eyolf Soot.

Lie's family soon moved away from Mandal. They lived in Trondhjem and Kristiania before moving to Tromsø when Bernt Lie was 15 years old. He finished his secondary education here in 1886, and moved to study law. He graduated with the cand.jur. degree in 1891. In October 1894, in Kristiania Bernt Lie married Hedvig Mariboe Aubert (1874–1946). They had the son Emil Lie, who became a sculptor, and their daughter Didi Lie married Supreme Court Justice, banker, politician and ambassador Arne Sunde. While the children were still young, though, Bernt Lie's family lived abroad, mainly in Rome, until 1910 when they settled in Lillehammer.

His debut novel was I Æventyrland, released in 1892. Mot Overmagt (1907) is regarded as being his best book. His four boys' books are also remembered; Sorte Ørn (1893), Svend Bidevind (1897), Peter Napoleon (1900) and Guttedage (1905). His last book was En Racekamp (1915). He wrote popular books, and was one of the more widely read authors in his time. He died on 14 July 1916, aged 48, in Sandefjord, and was buried in Tromsø.
