= Svend von Düring =

Norwegian actor

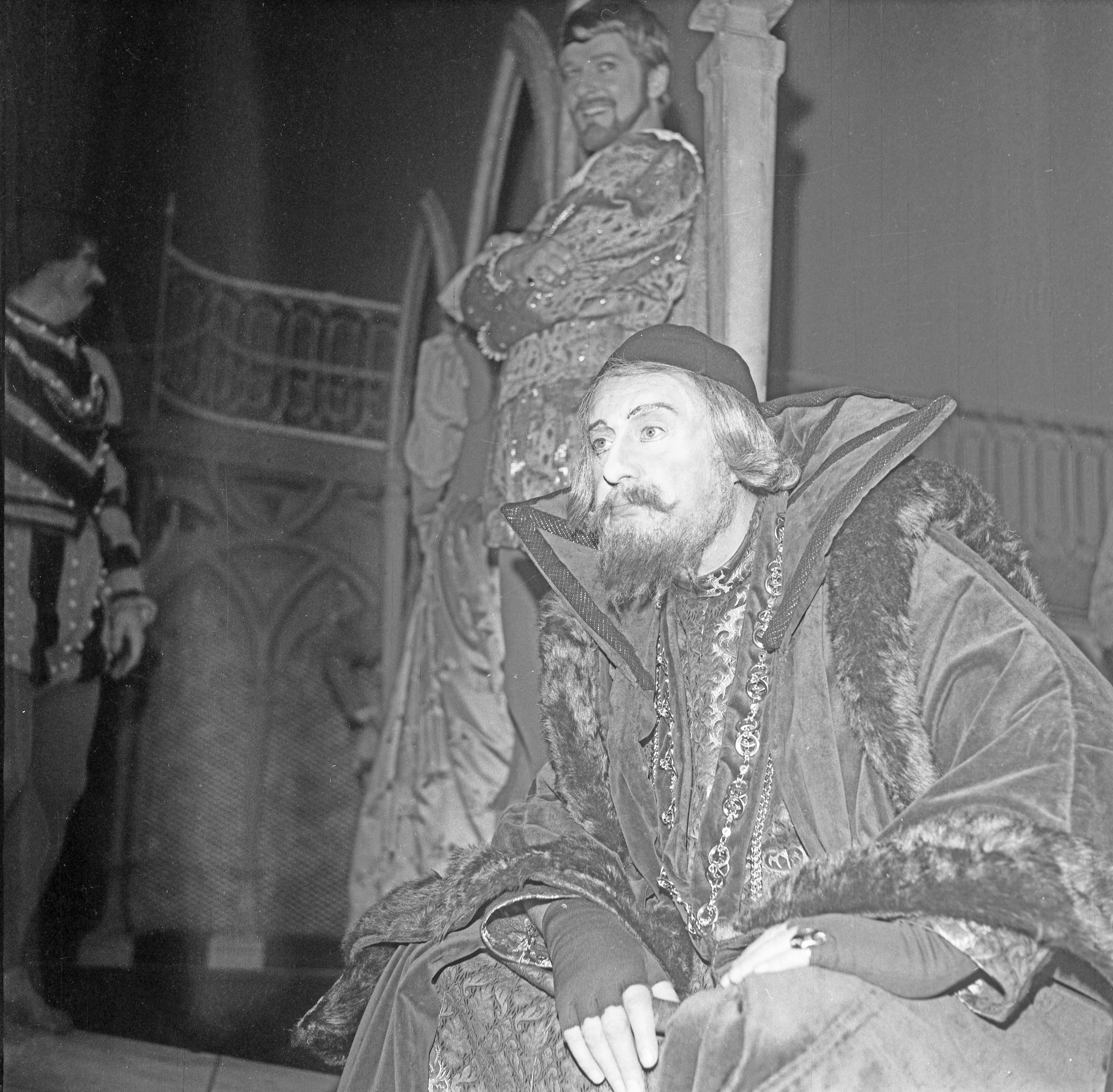
Svend von Düring as Shylock in The Merchant of Venice at Den Nationale Scene in Bergen, 1969.

Svend Soot von Düring (7 July 1915 – 7 June 1969) was a Norwegian actor.

He was a son of entertainer Botten Soot. He was a great-grandson of Engebret Soot and grandson of Eyolf Soot and Inga Bjørnson. His grandmother's second husband's child was Svend's half-aunt: Guri Stormoen. His mother was married twice.

He made his stage debut in 1933 at Søilen Teater. He was employed at Chat Noir from 1933 to 1936, and later at Trøndelag Teater and Den Nationale Scene. He also performed on the screen.
