= Guri Stormoen =

Norwegian actress (1901–1974)

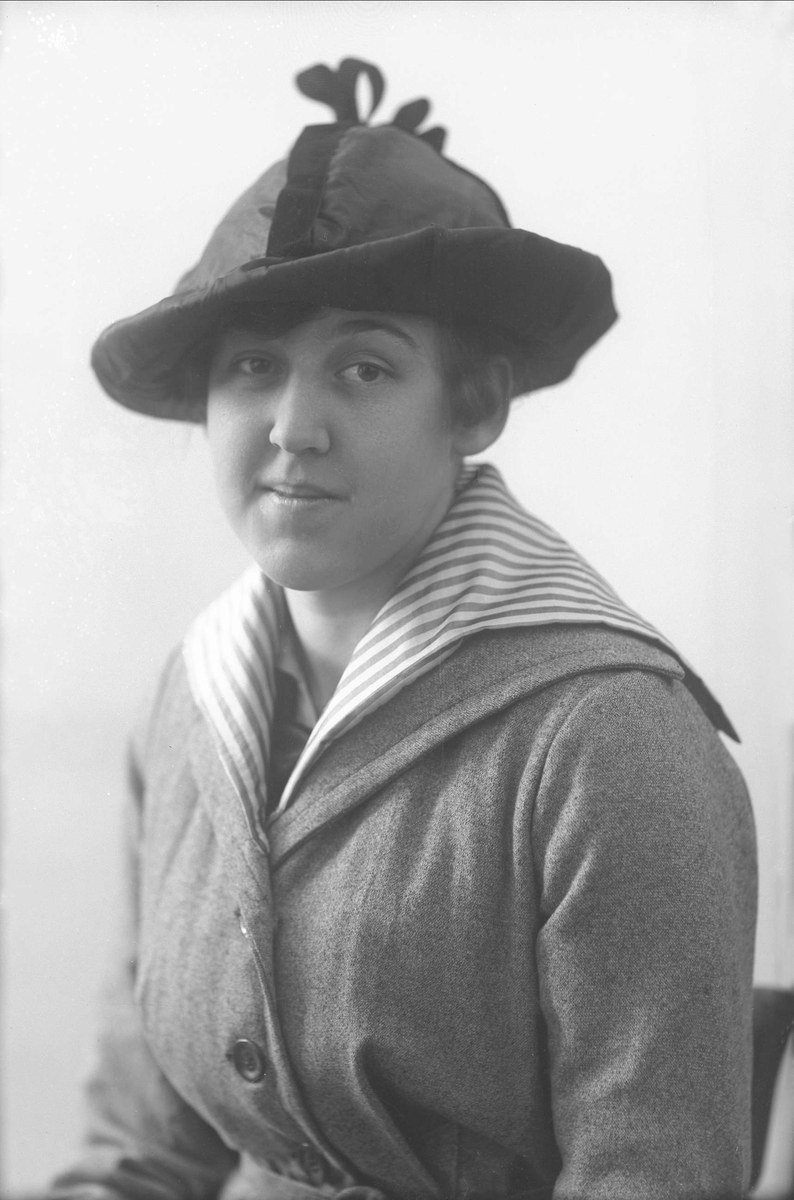
- Born: 10 September 1901
- Died: 1 November 1974 (aged 73)
- Awards: King's Medal of Merit in Gold (1969)

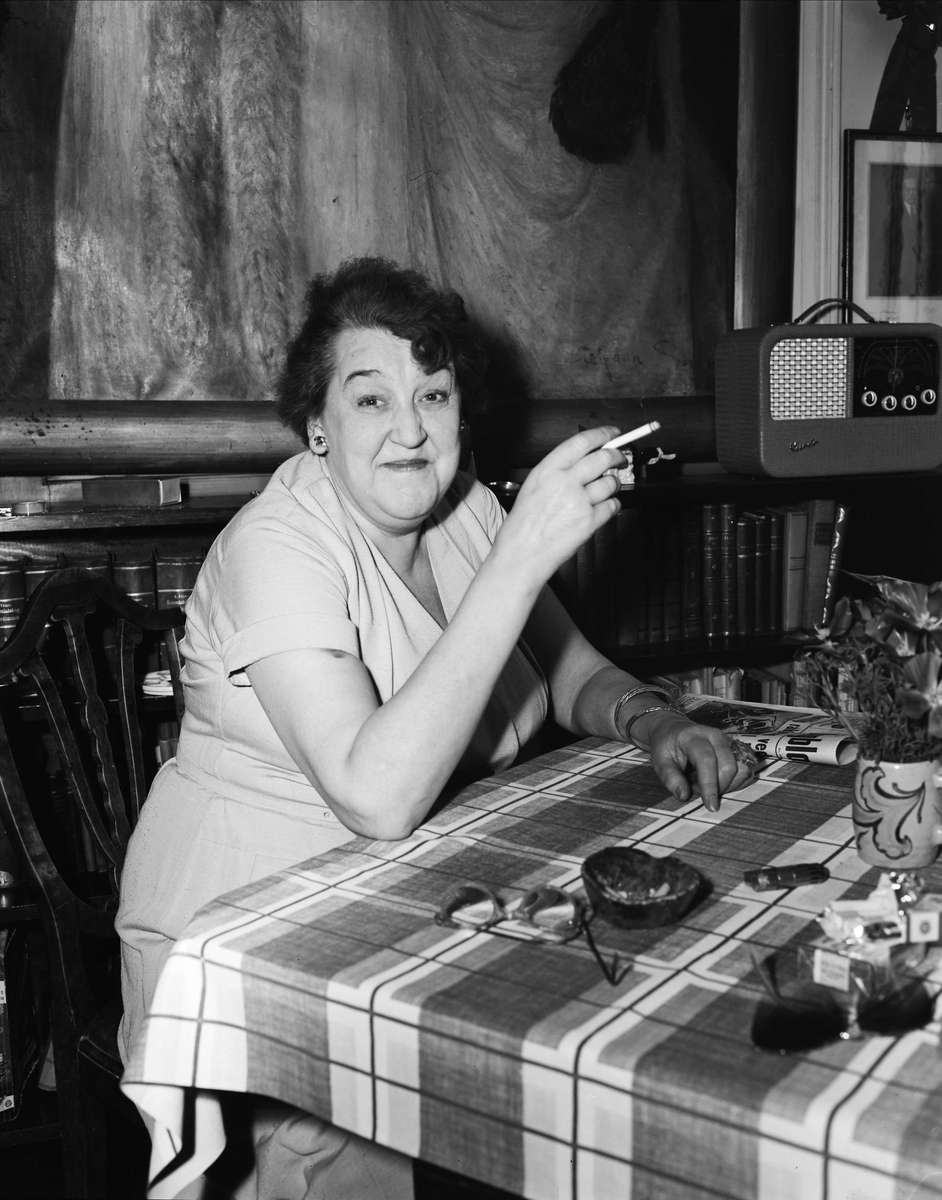
Guri Stormoen in July 1959

Guri Stormoen (10 September 1901 – 1 November 1974) was a Norwegian actress. She was active both on stage and in film.

== Biography ==
She was born in Kristiania (now Oslo), Norway as a daughter of actor Harald Stormoen (1872–1937) and his first wife, theatre leader Inga Bjørnson (1871–1952). She was a half-sister of Botten Soot and half-aunt of Svend von Düring through her mother's earlier marriage to Eyolf Soot. Also through her mother, Guri Stormoen was a grandniece of Bjørnstjerne Bjørnson. On her paternal side she was a relative of Hans Stormoen, Kjell Stormoen and Even Stormoen.

She took her education in ballet at the National Theatre and in theatre in Denmark. She made her stage debut in 1918 and film debut in 1921 in the movie Felix. She later starred in a number of films, including the feature film Fant (1937), which was directed by Tancred Ibsen based on a novel by Gabriel Scott.

She was a popular revue performer since the 1920s. From 1953 to 1954 she worked with serious theatre at Rogaland Teater in Stavanger as well as films.

She was married to Danish operette singer Povl Jensen for a short time. She died in November 1974 in Stavanger.

== Selected filmography ==
- Felix (1921)
- Fant (1937)
- To levende og en død (1937)
- Ungen (1938)
- Det æ'kke te å tru (1942)
- Vigdis (1943)
- Et spøkelse forelsker seg (1946)
- Ung frue forsvunnet (1953)
- Troll i ord (1954)
