= The Pilot and His Wife =

Novel by Jonas Lie

The Pilot and His Wife (Norwegian: Lodsen og hans Hustru; 1874) is a novel by Norwegian author Jonas Lie. It portrays the life of the sailor both at home and abroad and describes varied experiences at sea as well as in distant ports. The work is noted for its vigor of description. With a background of ocean waves, it is a story of married life.

== Plot ==
Salve Kristiansen loves a beautiful woman named Elisabeth and is evidently loved in return. For a time Elisabeth is attracted to a young officer who wishes to marry her. Her love for Salve prevails, however, and Elisabeth spurns the officer, but Salve, in desperation, has left his native land and is sailing toward foreign shores. After some years he returns to his home and finds that Elisabeth has been true to him. He marries her.

However, the thought of Elisabeth's momentary hesitation does not leave Salve, and this unfortunate circumstance makes life miserable for both. Ten years elapse before the husband and wife finally come to a clear understanding and a genuine appreciation of one another, and now at last are enabled to lay the foundation for a happy life together. The novel emphasizes the need of implicit confidence and trust, if two persons united in wedlock are to live happily together.
