= Aagot Nissen =

Norwegian actress (1882–1978)

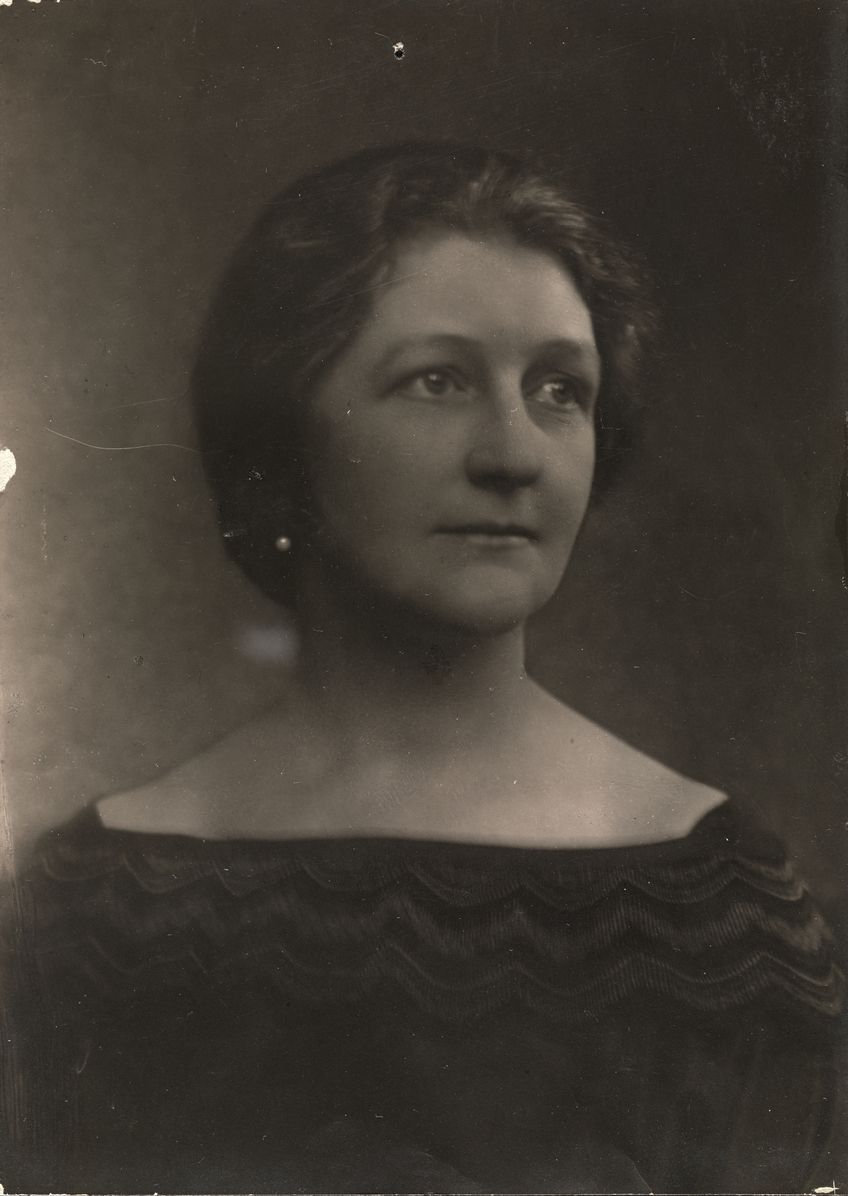
- Nissen circa 1920
- Born: Aagot Kavli; May 2, 1882; Bergen, Norway
- Died: December 16, 1978 (aged 96)
- Occupation: Actress
- Years active: 1899–1950
- Employer(s): National Theatre, Oslo
- Spouse: Karl Nissen
- Relatives: Arne Kavli (brother)

Aagot Nissen (née Kavli; May 2, 1882 – December 16, 1978) was a Norwegian actress.

== Biography ==
She was born in Bergen, Norway. She was the daughter of Kristoffer Kavli (1845–1888) and Agnes Texnes (1851–1937). She was the sister of painter Arne Kavli (1878–1970) and was married to pianist Karl Nissen (1879–1920).

She made her stage debut in 1899 at Oslo's National Theatre. She worked continuously for the National Theatre until she retired in 1950. She was the only actor that worked continuously for more than fifty seasons at the National Theatre from its start in 1899.

According to historian Nils Johan Ringdal, Nissen was the most employed actress at the National Theatre from the theatre's establishment, with a total of more than 200 assigned tasks. Among her favorite roles was the "princess" in various forms, both in ordinary plays and in children's plays.

== Filmography ==
- 1925: Himmeluret
