= Hesnes =

Village in Grimstad Municipality, Norway

- Village
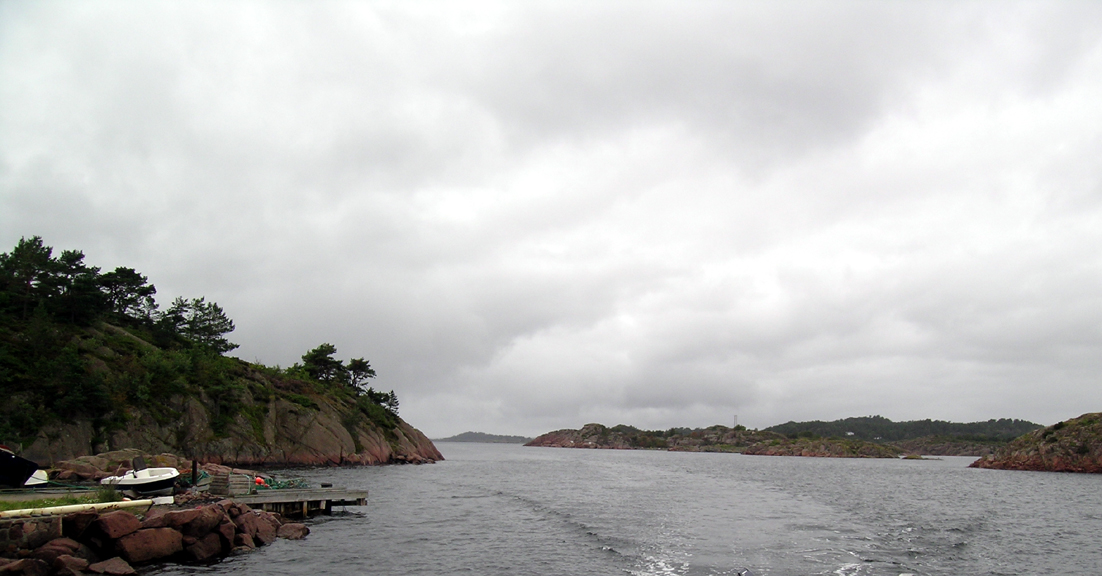
- View of the coast near Hesnes
- Interactive map of Hesnes
- Coordinates: 58.3446°N 08.6386°E
- Country: Norway
- Region: Southern Norway
- County: Agder
- District: Østre Agder
- Municipality: Grimstad Municipality
- Elevation: 22 m (72 ft)
- Time zone: UTC+01:00 (CET)
  - Summer (DST): UTC+02:00 (CEST)
- Post Code: 4885 Grimstad

Hesnes is a village in Grimstad Municipality in Agder county, Norway. The village is located on the Skagerrak coast about 2 kilometres (1.2 mi) northeast of the village of Rønnes and about 3 kilometres (1.9 mi) southeast of the village of Vik. The town of Grimstad lies about 6 kilometres (3.7 mi) by car from Hesnes.
