= Morning on the River =

Painting by Jonas Lie

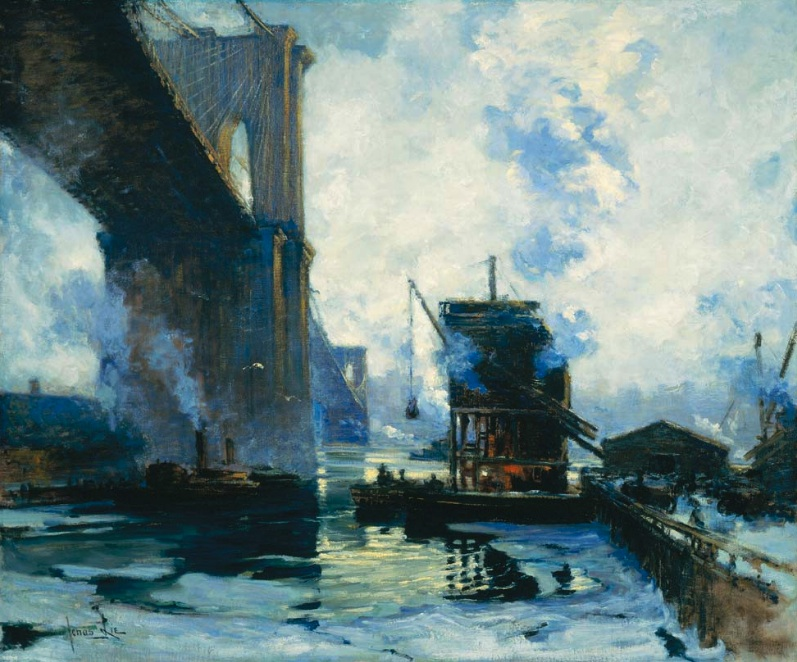
- Artist: Jonas Lie
- Year: 1911-12
- Medium: Oil on canvas
- Dimensions: 127 cm × 152.4 cm (50 in × 60 in)
- Location: Memorial Art Gallery of the University of Rochester, Rochester
- Accession: 1913.6

Morning on the River is an oil painting by Norwegian American artist Jonas Lie, painted in the beginning of the 20th century from 1911 to 1912. It is now in the permanent collections of the Memorial Art Gallery at Rochester, NY, United States of America as a gift from Ruth Sibley Gade in memory of James G. Averell.

== Formal qualities ==
Morning on the River captures a bustling morning scene through the use of line, color, shape, and texture to define both structure and movement. Short, textured brushstrokes create rhythmic patterns across the water and sky. Lie also creates a sense of space through the use of diagonal lines and varying thicknesses in linework add depth and direct the viewer toward the light on the river, establishing it as the focal point. The contrasting shapes of structured buildings and organic, round clouds further distinguish man-made objects like buildings and the Brooklyn Bridge from the natural beauty of the winter morning. The color palette of the work is cold and unsaturated, dominated by shades of blue and gray, which unify the painting and enhance this sense of space by distinguishing the foreground from the background. Rough textures are created by thick brushstrokes and smudged colors, it helps bringing energy to the scene, and capturing the dynamic atmosphere of a lively, busy morning in the New York City.

== Symbolism of the Brooklyn Bridge ==
As the main subject of the painting, the choice of including the famous Brooklyn Bridge is influenced by and reflects the historical and cultural background of this artwork. The Brooklyn Bridge is seen as an icon for modern America, as a symbolism for journey from old to new and the pursuit of the American Dream. This corresponds to the idea of the choice of Brooklyn Bridge as a sign of industrialization in Lie's painting.

In Seeing America, Gallali stated that Morning on the River illustrates the “untamed wilderness” of the modern city in America by the early 20th century. It is emphasized through the depiction of the Brooklyn Bridge, as it is considered as the “positive symbol of America's destiny.” As the bridge is viewed from below, its giant, magnificent, Gothic structure is revealed to the viewers, making it appears to be a “titanic monster” of industrialization rather than its usual elegant and modern image of being an” engineering marvel.” As a Norwegian-born American artist, Lie's personal interest in winter landscapes is also merged into this painting. It is visible through the heavy use of tinted blue to depict the bustling sky and smoke which symbolizes the vibrant industrial activity happening.

== Historical and artist's personal background ==
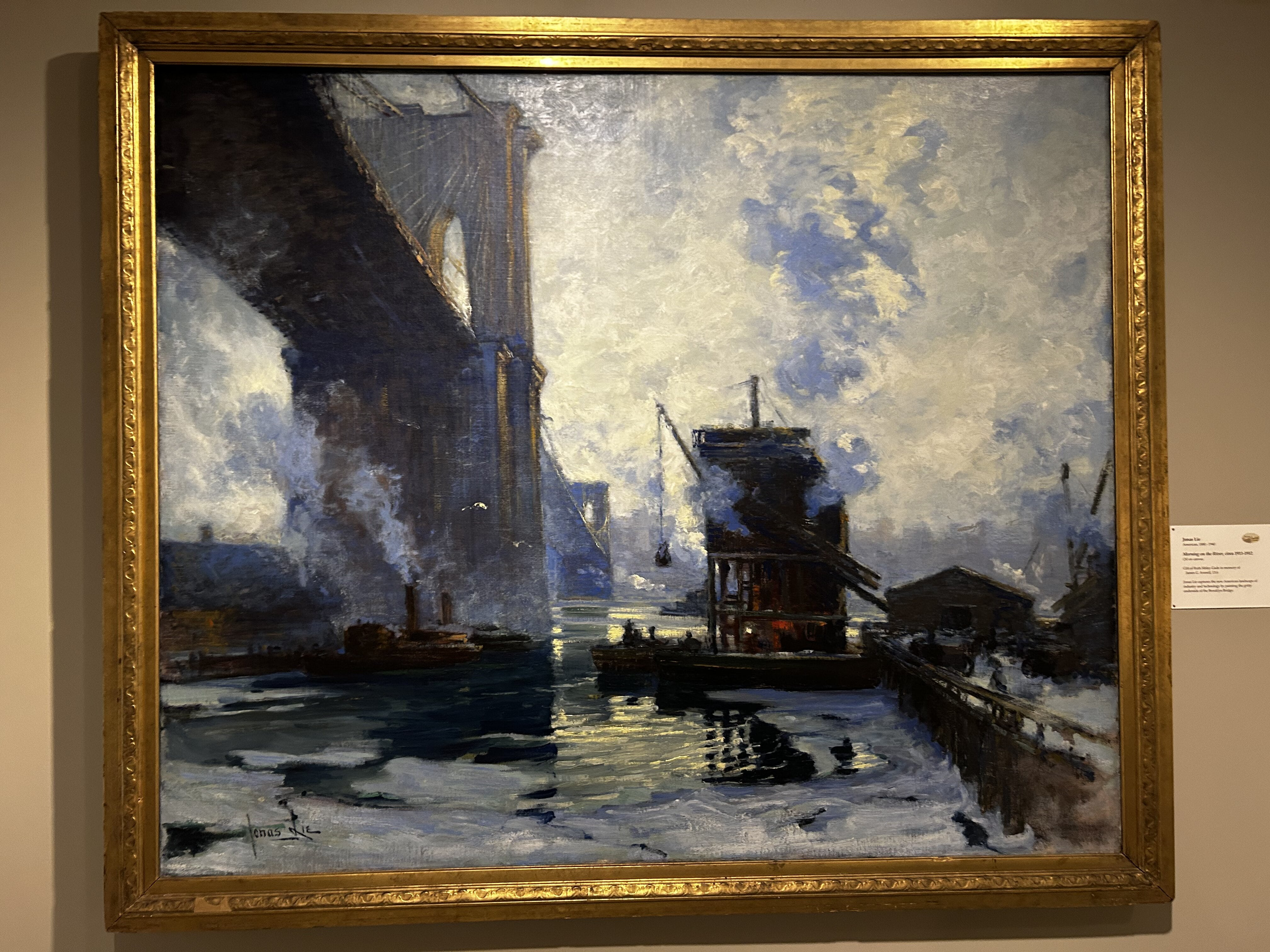
Jonas Lie, Morning on the River, on view in the galleries at the Memorial Art Gallery, Rochester, NY

Focusing on the artist's own personal background, as Lie spent a great portion of his childhood back in Norway, he was heavily influenced by the ideology of "the language of the Earth", and leads to his love and admiration for the beauty and threats of the mountains. This is reflected by his frequent depictions of landscapes, and the constant theme of an "uncanny" feeling in his works. It is "sometimes by gentle suggestion, sometimes by an ominous threat dramatically presented in color and form." Specifically on Morning on the River, Lie's artistic choices of making a landscape painting, and the choice of depicting the giant Brooklyn Bridge from a low angle also illustrates this sense of "ominous threat" through the use of form. Lie was also known as a "versatile" painter. While he does a lot of landscape paintings, a portion his paintings were also focused on more industrialized subjects such as city structures, roadways and bridges. The artwork itself, Morning on the River, was created on 1911-12, which is during the time of the second phase of European immigration into New York City. This also corresponds to Lie's background of being half-American and half-Norwegian, who moved to United States with his family when Lie was 12 years old.
