= Alfhild Stormoen =

Norwegian actress (1883–1974)

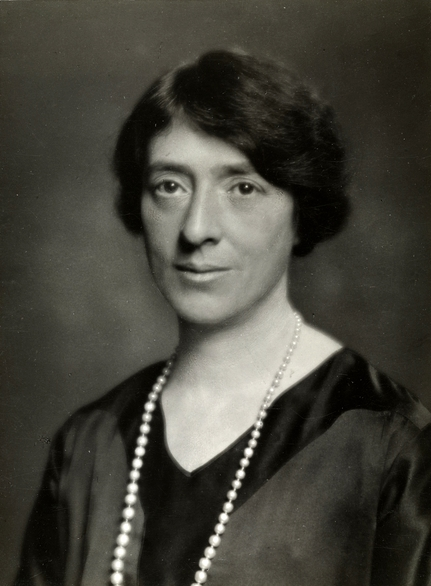
- Born: Alfhild Larsen; January 30, 1883; Kristiania (now Oslo), Norway
- Died: February 11, 1974 (aged 91); Oslo, Norway
- Occupation: Actress
- Spouse: Harald Stormoen
- Relatives: Nils Larsen, Lars Larsen

Alfhild Stormoen (née Alfhild Larsen, January 30, 1883 – February 11, 1974) was a Norwegian Norwegian actress and director.

== Family ==
Alfhild Stormoen was born in Kristiania (now Oslo), Norway, as the younger sister of the landscape painter Lars Larsen (1876–1955) and the older sister of the pianist Nils Larsen, (1888–1937); their parents were the caretaker Nils August Larsen (1851–1912) and Anne Jensen Røhne (1846–1933). On July 9, 1909, in Kristiania Alfhild married the actor Harald Stormoen in his second marriage. Alfhild Stormoen had two daughters with Harald Stormoen: Anne Stormoen (1911–1930) and Siri Stormoen (married Boehlke, 1921–1981).

== Life and work ==
Stormoen made her debut at the Central Theater on January 19, 1904, in the title role in Agnete by Amalie Skram. Regarding her debut, it was written that "Judging from her performance yesterday, one is faced here with a rather significant talent." She was engaged with the Central Theater from 1904 to 1907.

In the fall of 1907, she took part in the Dybwad tour, in which a group of Norwegian actors led by Johanne Dybwad performed Henrik Ibsen's Bygmester Solness at the New Theater in Berlin. The tour also visited Norwegian cities, including Trondheim.

In 1908, Stormoen transferred to the National Theater, where she was engaged until 1951. She was a respected character actor, including as Karen in Nils Kjær's Regnskapets dag, Mathilde in Bjørnstjerne Bjørnson's De Nygifte, Tora in Bjørnson's Sigurd Slembe, the priest's widow in Bjørnson's Over ævne I, and Petra Hargant in Nini Roll Anker's Finfeier.

In 1918, Stormoen took part in a tour organized by the National Theater, in which the play Narren by Peter Egge was performed in a number of cities, from Fredrikshald to Kristiansand.

She also appeared in some films, including Carl Theodor Dreyer's Glomdalsbruden (1926) and Alfred Maurstad's En herre med bart (1942).

== Selected theater roles ==
- Agnete in Agnete by Amalie Skram (Central Theater, 1904)
- Ellen von Tønning in Maskerade (Norwegian title: Livets Maskerade) by Ludwig Fulda (Central Theater, 1905)
- Elise in Elise by Hjalmar Christensen (Central Theater, 1906)
- Kaja in Bygmester Solness by Henrik Ibsen (New Theater, Berlin, 1907)
- Karen in Regnskapets dag by Nils Kjær (National Theater, 1908)
- Mathilde in De Nygifte by Bjørnstjerne Bjørnson
- Tora in Sigurd Slembe by Bjørnstjerne Bjørnson (National Theater, 1911)
- The priest's widow in Over ævne I by Bjørnstjerne Bjørnson
- Petra Hargant in Finfeier by Nini Roll Anker (National Theater, 1912)
- Queen Gunhild in En spurv i Tranedans by Jens Christian Hostrup (National Theater, 1912)
- Mrs. Heyst in Påsk (Norwegian title: Paaske) by August Strindberg (National Theater, 1919)
- Petra in Piken by Nini Roll Anker (National Theater, 1925)

== Filmography ==
- 1926: Glomdalsbruden as Kari Braaten
- 1942: En herre med bart as a fortune teller
- 1951: Skadeskutt as Wang's aunt

== Scholarships and grants ==
- 1920–1921: Government Grant for Artists, NOK 1,000
- 1921–1922: Government Grant for Artists, NOK 1,250
