= Arne Kavli =

Norwegian painter

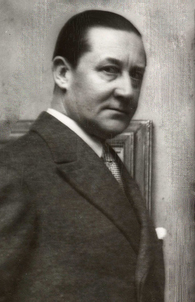
Arne Kavli, c. 1933

Arne Kavli (27 May 1878 – 23 September 1970) was a Norwegian painter.

== Biography ==
Kavli was born in Bergen, Norway. He was the son of actor Kristoffer Kavli (1845–1888) and Agnes Texnes (1851–1937). He was the brother of actress Aagot Nissen. He was married three times; in 1903 with Tulla Larsen (1869–1942); in 1911 with Hildur Mønniche (b. 1883) and in 1925 with Thony Drude Isachsen (b. 1897). From his first marriage, he was the brother-in-law of businessman and sailer Alfred Waldemar Garmann Larsen.

Kavli debuted at the Autumn Exhibition (Høstutstillingen) in Oslo during 1896. He studied at art academies in Antwerp (1897) Paris (1902–03) and Bruges (1903). He also trained in Copenhagen under Peder Severin Krøyer and Laurits Tuxen (1898).

Kavli first painted in a neo-romantic style and became particularly known for his images from Jæren. Starting from the 1910s he became more inspired by French painting. Dating from the beginning of the 1930s, Kavli collected most of his motifs from southern Norway. He stayed at his summer house at Rønnes outside of the town of Grimstad. He is most associated with portraits and landscapes. He is represented at the National Gallery in Oslo with fifteen works, including Jær-kone and Landskap fra Jæren from 1899 and Ung dame from 1910.

Arne Kavli was the recipient of the silver medal at the International Graphic Exhibition at Leipzig in 1914, was awarded at Gothenburg Exhibition in 1923 and was the recipient of the King's Medal of Merit in 1968. He died in Oslo during 1970 and was buried at Vestre gravlund.
