= Inga Bjørnson =

Norwegian philanthropist and theatre leader

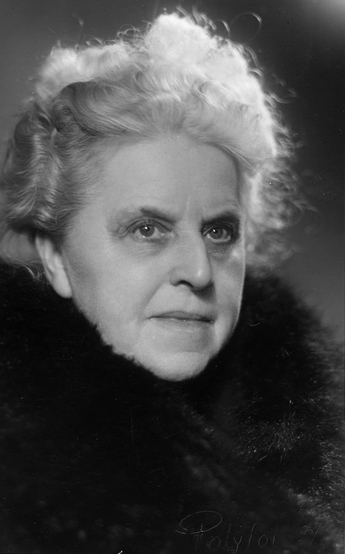
- Inga Bjørnson, c. 1940
- Born: 4 March 1871; Christiania, Norway
- Died: 8 March 1952 (aged 81)
- Occupations: Philanthropist and theatre leader
- Known for: Pioneer of children's theatre in Norway
- Spouses: Eyolf Soot; Harald Stormoen
- Children: Botten Soot; Guri Stormoen
- Relatives: Bjørnstjerne Bjørnson (uncle)

Inga Bjørnson (4 March 1871 – 8 March 1952) was a Norwegian philanthropist and theatre leader.

== Personal life ==
She was born in Christiania, a daughter of Peter Elias Bjørnson and Laura Marie Mathilde Riiser Larsen, and niece of Bjørnstjerne Bjørnson. She was married first to painter Eyolf Soot, later to actor Harald Stormoen. She is the mother of Botten Soot and Guri Stormoen.

== Career ==
Bjørnson is particularly known as a pioneer of children's theatre in Norway. She founded her own children's theatre in 1920, the first Scandinavian theatre where children performed for children. The theatre opened with Margrethe Munthe's play Askepott, and continued with other stage adaptations of fairytales and children's books. Among her books are Dundor-Heikka from 1916, Våre barnesanger from 1926, and 30 år med barneteatret from 1950.
