= Harald Stormoen =

Norwegian actor

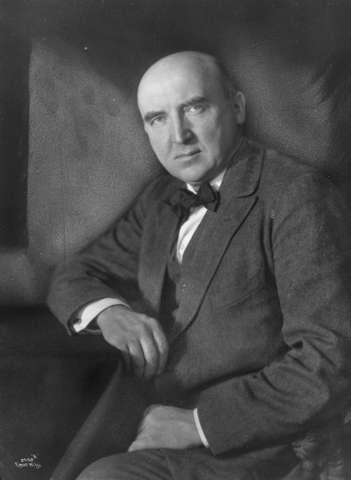
- Born: 8 September 1872
- Died: 14 November 1937 (aged 65)
- Spouse(s): Inga Bjørnson, Alfhild Stormoen
- Awards: Knight First Class of the Order of St. Olav (1932–)

Harald Stormoen (8 September 1872 – 14 November 1937) was a Norwegian actor.

== Personal life ==
Stormoen was born in Nordre Odalen Municipality as a son of farmer Marius Stormoen. He was a half-brother of Hans Stormoen, an uncle of Kjell Stormoen and a granduncle of Even Stormoen. By education, Stormoen had the examen artium from 1890 as well as one year at the Norwegian Military Academy. From October 1900 to 1909 he was married to Inga Bjørnson (1871–1952); they had the child Guri Stormoen who became an actress. In July 1909 Harald Stormoen married Alfhild Larsen (1883–1974).

== Acting career ==
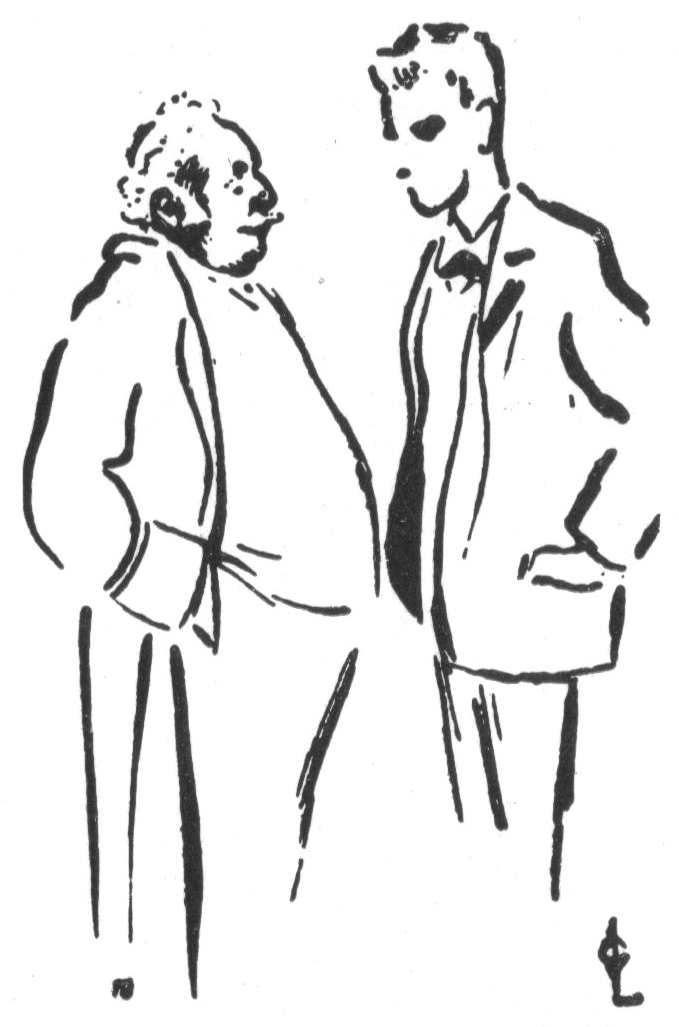
Satirical drawing by Gustav Lærum of Stormoen (left) and August Oddvar (right)

After some years in the United States, where he made his acting debut, Stormoen returned to Norway in 1895 and worked at various theatres. His breakthrough was playing the character "Seladon Andrisen" in Hans Aanrud's comedy Storken at Harald Otto's Norske Teaterselskab, and he also played this character later at other theatres. In 1899 he was hired at the newly opened National Theatre. He worked here from 1899 to 1918, 1921 to 1928 and 1935 to 1937. At the National Theatre Stormoen played both comic and tragic characters, often portraying elder men. Among his roles was "the captain" in Strindberg's drama The Dance of Death. From 1928 to 1935 he worked at Det Nye Teater. He also starred in movies between 1925 and 1932.

== Organisation work ==
Stormoen chaired the Norwegian Actors' Equity Association from 1913 to 1915, from 1921 to 1924 and again from 1925 to 1928. During his first period the association successfully started giving matinées to increase its income. In his second period the association celebrated its 25th anniversary. During his third period there was a tough struggle with Trondjems Teater, which experienced a difficult economic period and treated its staff badly. He was nominated Honorary Member of the association at his 60th anniversary in 1932.

Harald Stormoen was decorated as a Knight, First Class of the Royal Norwegian Order of St. Olav in 1932. He died in November 1937 in Oslo.
