= Rønnes =

Village in Grimstad Municipality, Norway

- Village
- Interactive map of Rønnes
- Coordinates: 58.3389°N 08.6036°E
- Country: Norway
- Region: Southern Norway
- County: Agder
- District: Østre Agder
- Municipality: Grimstad Municipality
- Elevation: 2 m (6.6 ft)
- Time zone: UTC+01:00 (CET)
  - Summer (DST): UTC+02:00 (CEST)
- Post Code: 4885 Grimstad

Rønnes is a village in Grimstad Municipality in Agder county, Norway. The village is located on the eastern shore of the Vikkilen bay, directly across the bay from the harbour of the town of Grimstad. The village of Hesnes lies about 2 kilometres (1.2 mi) to the northeast and the town of Grimstad lies only about 800 metres (2,600 ft) to the west (across the bay).
