= Botten Soot =

Norwegian actress, singer and dancer (1895–1958)

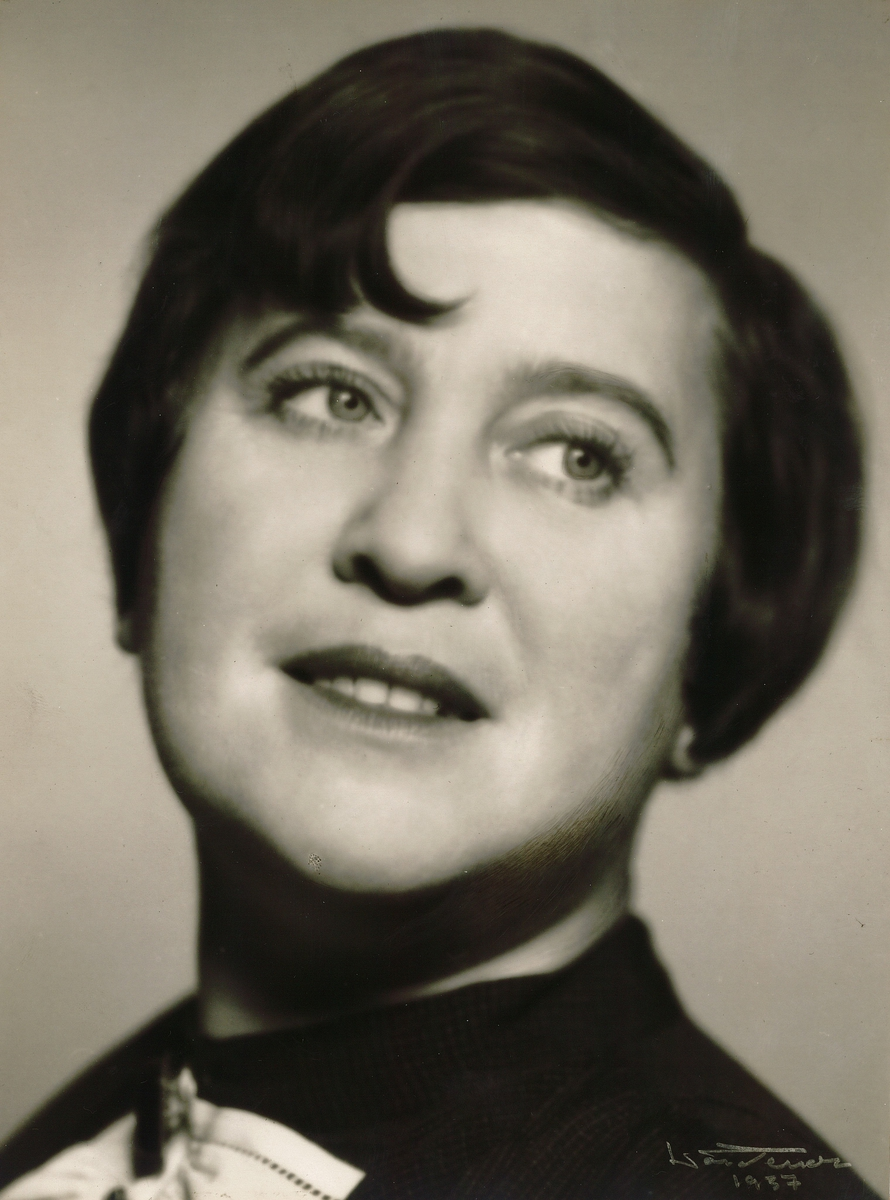
- Botten Soot in 1937
- Born: Ingeborg Bergit Soot; 22 March 1895; Bergen, Norway
- Died: 21 May 1958 (aged 63); Oslo
- Occupation: Actress
- Spouse: Olaf Kronstad
- Children: Svend von Düring
- Parent(s): Eyolf Soot; Inga Bjørnson
- Relatives: Harald Stormoen (step-father); Guri Stormoen (half-sister)

Botten Soot (born Ingeborg Bergit Soot; 22 March 1895 – 21 May 1958) was a Norwegian actress, singer, and dancer. Her primary venue was the cabaret and revue theatre Chat Noir, where she performed for most of her career.

== Early and personal life ==
Born in Bergen, Soot was the daughter of the painter Eyolf Soot (1859–1928) and children's theatre pioneer Inga Bjørnson (1871–1952). Her parents divorced in 1900; her mother married the actor Harald Stormoen when Botten was five years old, and Botten Soot was thus a half-sister of the actress Guri Stormoen. She also gave birth to a child, the actor Svend von Düring. She learned ballet as a child and was a student at Thora Hals Olsen ballet school; later she studied singing with Bergljot Ibsen, Wilhelm Cappelen Kloed and Raimund von zur-Mühlen, and harmony with Carsten Carlsen.

She was later married to sculptor Trygve Thorsen, and their daughter Berit Soot Kløvig became a painter and sculptor. This marriage was eventually dissolved, and she married actor Olaf Kronstad in 1924.

== Career ==
Soot made her stage debut as a dancer in 1911, as a revue artist at the Chat Noir in 1913, and as a singer at Nationaltheatret in 1914. She spent most of her career entertaining at the revue stage Chat Noir where she performed together with Einar Rose, artistic director at Chat Noir and at the Mayol-teatret opposite theater and film actor Harald Heide Steen. Botten also performed together with theatre actress and singer Tutta Rolf and her husband Ernst Rolf.

After the Second World War, Soot toured Norway with her one-woman show, in stand-up comedy style.

A scriptwriter, Soot also wrote texts for her own performances. Among her best known texts were "Vårvise" and "De gammeldagse Piger". Her book Mamma i fint selskap og andre historier was published in 1946.

Soot died in Oslo on 21 May 1958.

== Filmography ==
- Under forvandlingens lov (1911)
- En vinternat (1917)
- De forældreløse (1917)
- Jomfru Trofast (1921)
