= Nils Lie =

Norwegian writer, literary consultant and translator (1902–1978)

- Born: 17 May 1902; Bergen, Norway
- Died: 19 April 1978 (aged 75); Bærum, Norway
- Occupation(s): Writer, literary consultant and translator
- Awards: Bastian Prize (1954); Arts Council Norway's prize for translations (1970)

Nils Lie (17 May 1902 – 19 April 1978) was a Norwegian writer, literary consultant and translator. As a writer, he is known for the crime novel Bergenstoget plyndret inat from 1923. He was a long-time literary consultant for Gyldendal Norsk Forlag, and received prizes for his translation works.

== Personal life ==
Born in Bergen on 17 May 1902, Lie was the son of Vilhelm Gabriel Heiberg Lie and Anna Benedicte Aars Nicolaysen. He was first married to Ingeborg Nicoline Stang Lund. Their marriage was dissolved, and in 1935 he married Rikke Anna Catarina Scott-Hansen.

== Career ==
=== Education and consultance work ===
Having passed examen artium at the Bergen Cathedral School in 1919, Lie graduated with a cand.mag. degree in philology from the University of Oslo in 1925. In 1926, he was assigned as editor for the weekly family magazine Hjemmet. From 1935, he worked as a literary consultant for the publishing house Gyldendal Norsk Forlag. During the German occupation of Norway, he resigned his job at Gyldendal, and resided in London from 1942 to 1945. He continued his work for Gyldendal after the war, until his retirement in 1972.

=== Translator ===
Lie translated a large number of books into Norwegian language, including works by Frans G. Bengtsson, Arthur Conan Doyle, John Steinbeck, Rudyard Kipling and Erich Kästner. He was awarded the Bastian Prize in 1954 for his translation of a work by Alan Paton. He received Arts Council Norway's translation prize in 1970.

=== Writer ===
In 1923, Lie published the crime novel Bergenstoget plyndret inat!, written jointly with fellow student Nordahl Grieg under the pseudonym Jonathan Jerv. The novel's narrative is a group of students in need of money that commit a robbery of train passengers on the railway from Bergen to Oslo, while the train up in the high mountains. The book was basis for a silent film from 1928, directed by Uwe Jens Krafft.

Further books are the children's book Trekløveret from 1924, and the novel På sporet for young adults from 1930. He also wrote a short biography of his distant relative, the writer Jonas Lie, and edited short story anthologies and poetry anthologies.

== Death ==
Lie died in Bærum on 19 April 1978, aged 75.
