= Erika Nissen =

Norwegian pianist (1845–1903)

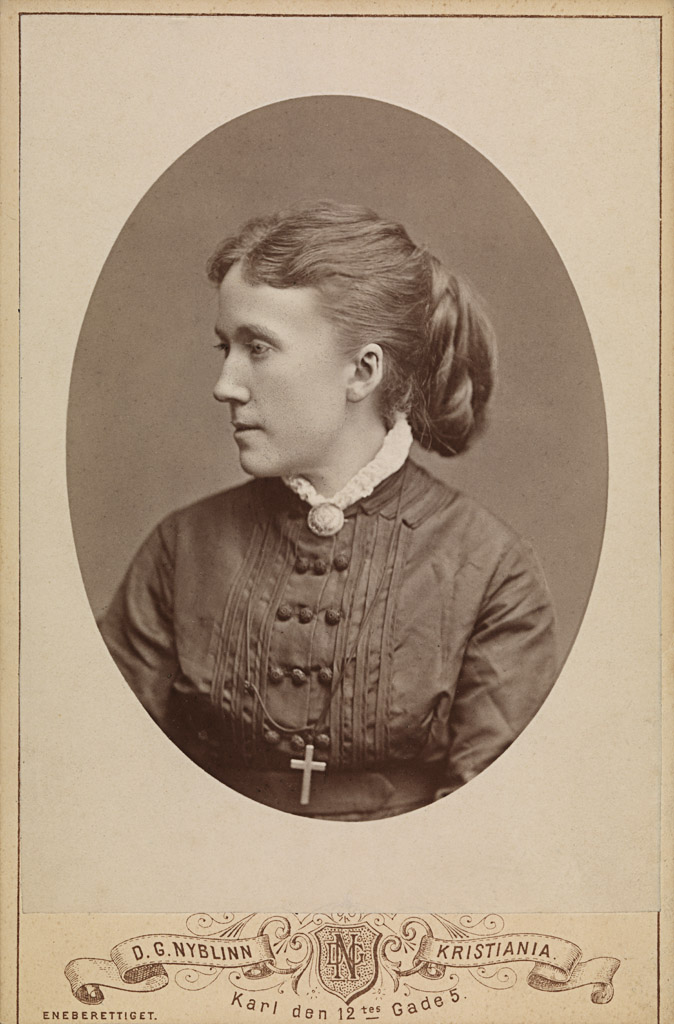
Erika Nissen

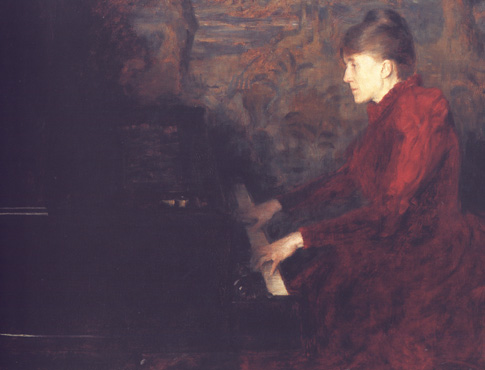
Painted by Erik Werenskiold around 1890.

Erika Nissen, née Lie (17 January 1845 – 27 October 1903), also known as Erika Røring Møinichen Lie Nissen, was a Norwegian pianist.

She was born in Kongsvinger as the daughter of jurist Michael Strøm Lie and his wife Ingeborg Birgitte Røring Møinichen. She was the sister of Thomasine Lie, who married Jonas Lie. She was the niece of Erik Røring Møinichen, her mother's brother.

She made her concert debut in 1866 in Berlin, and played in Scandinavia, Germany, the Netherlands, Switzerland and Paris. She retired at the end of the 1870s to work as a music teacher. In 1894 she was granted an artist's scholarship by the Norwegian state.

She was engaged to Rikard Nordraak for a short time. In 1874 she married politician Oscar Nissen. They were the parents of the pianist Karl Nissen. Their marriage was dissolved in February 1895, after many years of unhappy marriage. From 1892 to 1894 she had an affair with Bjørnstjerne Bjørnson.
