= Emil Lie =

Norwegian sculptor (1897–1976)

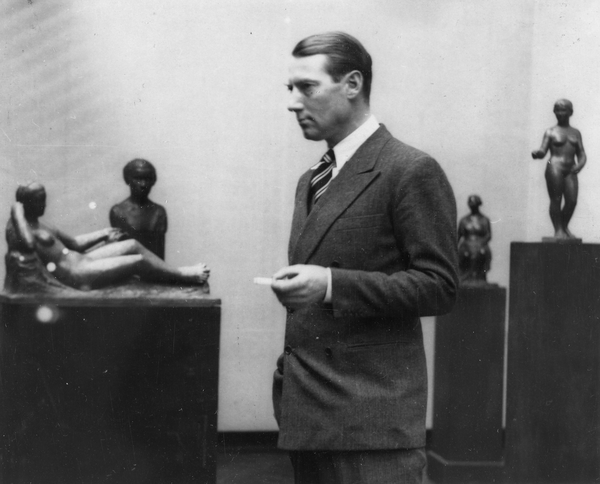
- Born: 29 July 1897; Berchtesgaden, Germany
- Died: 3 August 1976 (aged 79)
- Occupation: Sculptor
- Parent: Bernt Lie
- Relatives: Lars Christensen (father-in-law); Helge Krog (father-in-law)

Emil Lie (29 July 1897 – 3 August 1976) was a Norwegian sculptor.

Lie was born in Berchtesgaden to novelist Bernt Lie and Hedvig Mariboe Aubert. He was married three times, and among his fathers-in-law were ship owner Lars Christensen and writer Helge Krog. His works include decorations of Rådhusplassen outside the in Oslo City Hall, and several portrait busts and sculptures. He chaired Norsk Billedhuggerforening from 1954 to 1957.
