= Karl Nissen =

Norwegian journalist and conductor (1879–1920)

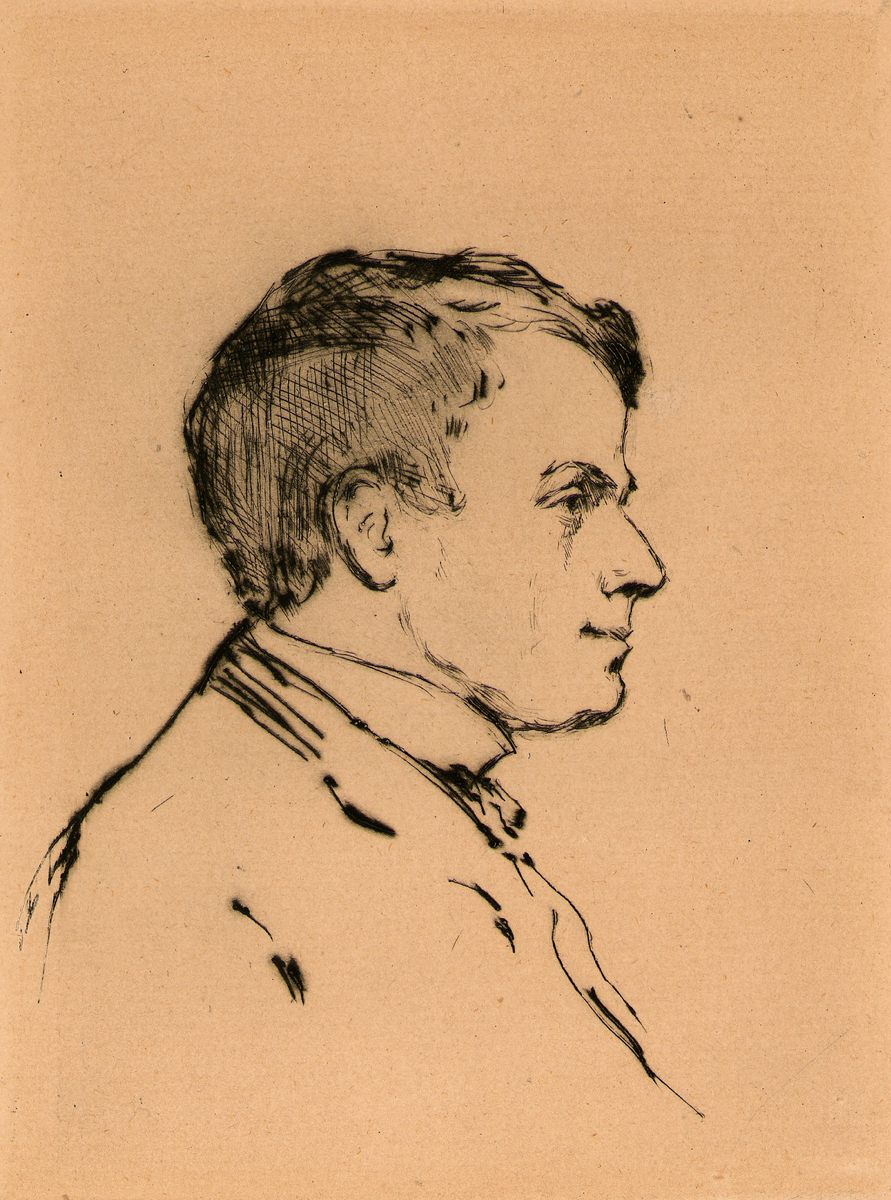

Background information
- Born: February 27, 1879; Kristiania
- Died: May 14, 1920 (aged 41)
- Instrument: Pianist
- Years active: 1897–1920

Karl Nissen (February 27, 1879 – May 14, 1920) was a Norwegian pianist, teacher, music journalist, and conductor.

== Biography ==
Nissen was born in Kristiania (now Oslo), the son of the physician Oscar Nissen and pianist Erika Nissen, and he was taught piano by his mother. He first performed publicly at one of his mother's concerts in 1897.

Nissen studied under Ferruccio Busoni in Berlin, and made concert trips to Berlin, Prague, Antwerp, Odessa, and several places in Scandinavia. He then settled down in his hometown and gave concerts that included, among others, the actress Gyda Christensen from 1908 to 1910. He also gave a number of duo concerts together with pianists Nils Larsen and Fridtjof Backer-Grøndahl, including Mozart's double concerto for two pianos.

In 1907, Nissen married Aagot Kavli, an actress at the National Theatre and the sister of the painter Arne Kavli.

Nissen was a teacher at the Oslo Conservatory of Music. Among his students were David Monrad Johansen and Elisabeth Munthe-Kaas Sandvik, who debuted at his concert in 1906. He was chairman of the Norwegian National Music Teachers' Federation from 1918 to 1920.

In 1911 he became the conductor of the Cæcilia mixed choir, succeeded by Leif Halvorsen after his death. Nissen also conducted the Oslo Music Society from 1913 to 1918 and the Businessmen's Choral Society (Handelsstandens Sangforening) in Oslo from 1919 until his death. He was a music reviewer at Aftenposten from 1912 to 1917.

Karl Nissen received the King's Medal of Merit in gold in 1912.
