= Jonas Lie (painter) =

American painter

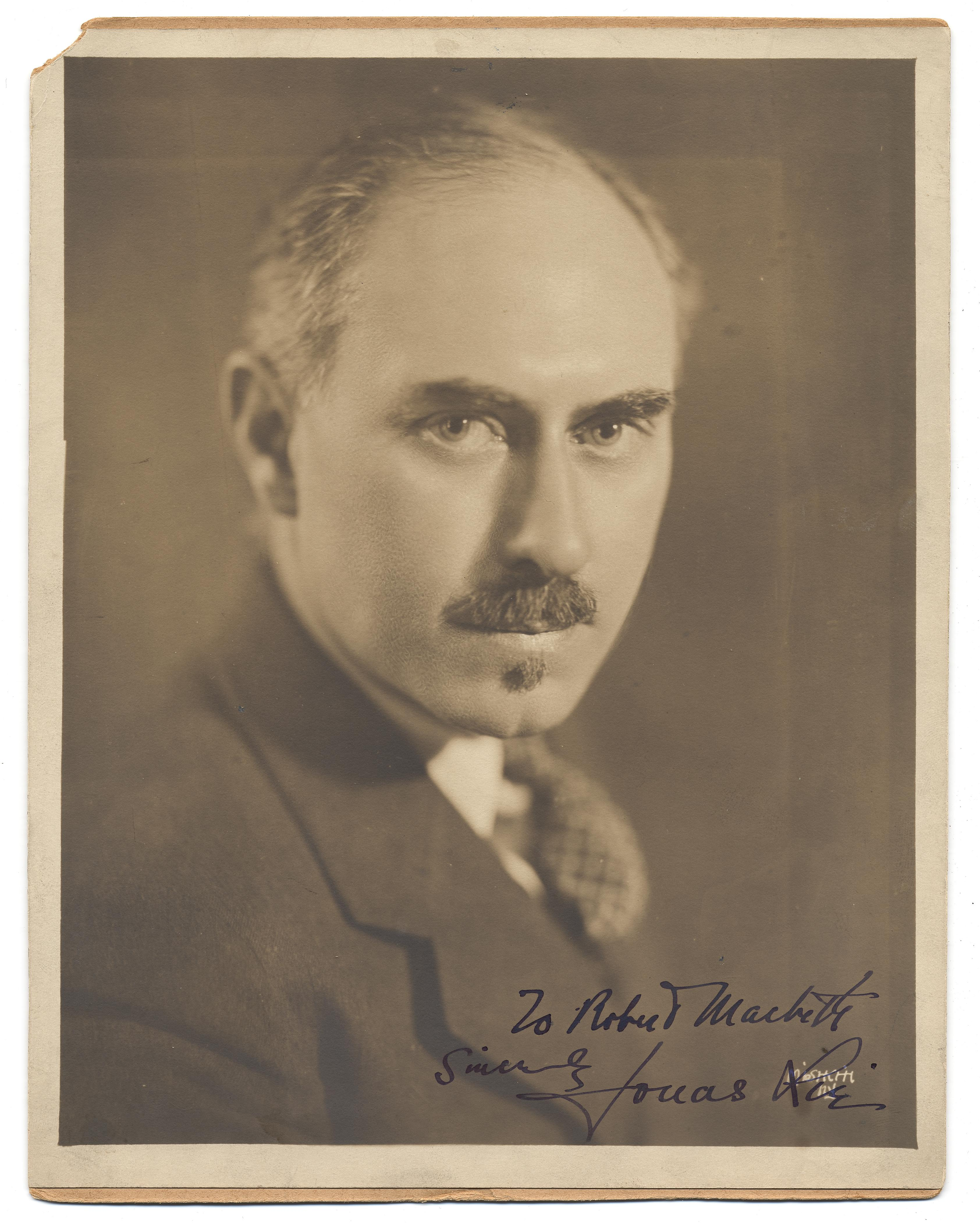
- Born: April 29, 1880; Moss, Norway
- Died: January 18, 1940 (aged 59); New York City, U.S.
- Education: Art Students League of New York

Jonas Lie (April 29, 1880 – January 18, 1940) was a Norwegian-born American painter and teacher.

Lie is best known for his Expressionist paintings of the New England coastline and New York City. He documented construction of the Panama Canal with thirty canvases, and represented the United States in the 1928 Summer Olympics art competition.

== Background ==
Lie was born in Moss, in Østfold county, Norway. His father Sverre Lie (1841–1892) was a Norwegian civil engineer and his mother Helen Augusta Steele (1853–1906) was an American from Hartford, Connecticut. He was named for his father's cousin (and brother-in-law), the famous Norwegian author Jonas Lie, who had married his father's sister Thomasine.

Following his father's death in 1892, 12-year-old Lie was sent to live with Thomasine and Jonas Lie in Paris. His aunt and uncle's home was a meeting place for famous artists such as Henrik Ibsen, Bjørnstjerne Bjørnson, Edvard Grieg, and Georg Brandes. He had already received drawing instruction from Christian Skredsvig in Norway, and Lie attended a small private art school in Paris. The following year he traveled to the United States, where he joined his mother and sisters in New York City. From 1897 to 1906, he trained at the Art Students League of New York.

== Career ==
Between 1901 and the memorial exhibition in 1940 his work was shown all over America. In 1905 Lie exhibited 34 pictures in the Pratt Institute, Brooklyn Museum of Art. Between 1905 and 1938 Lie had 57 one-man shows, each including from 12 to 45 paintings. He participated in important annual and biennial exhibitions at the National Academy of Design, the Pennsylvania Academy of the Fine Arts, the Art Institute of Chicago, and the Corcoran Gallery of Art in Washington as well as most of the world fairs.

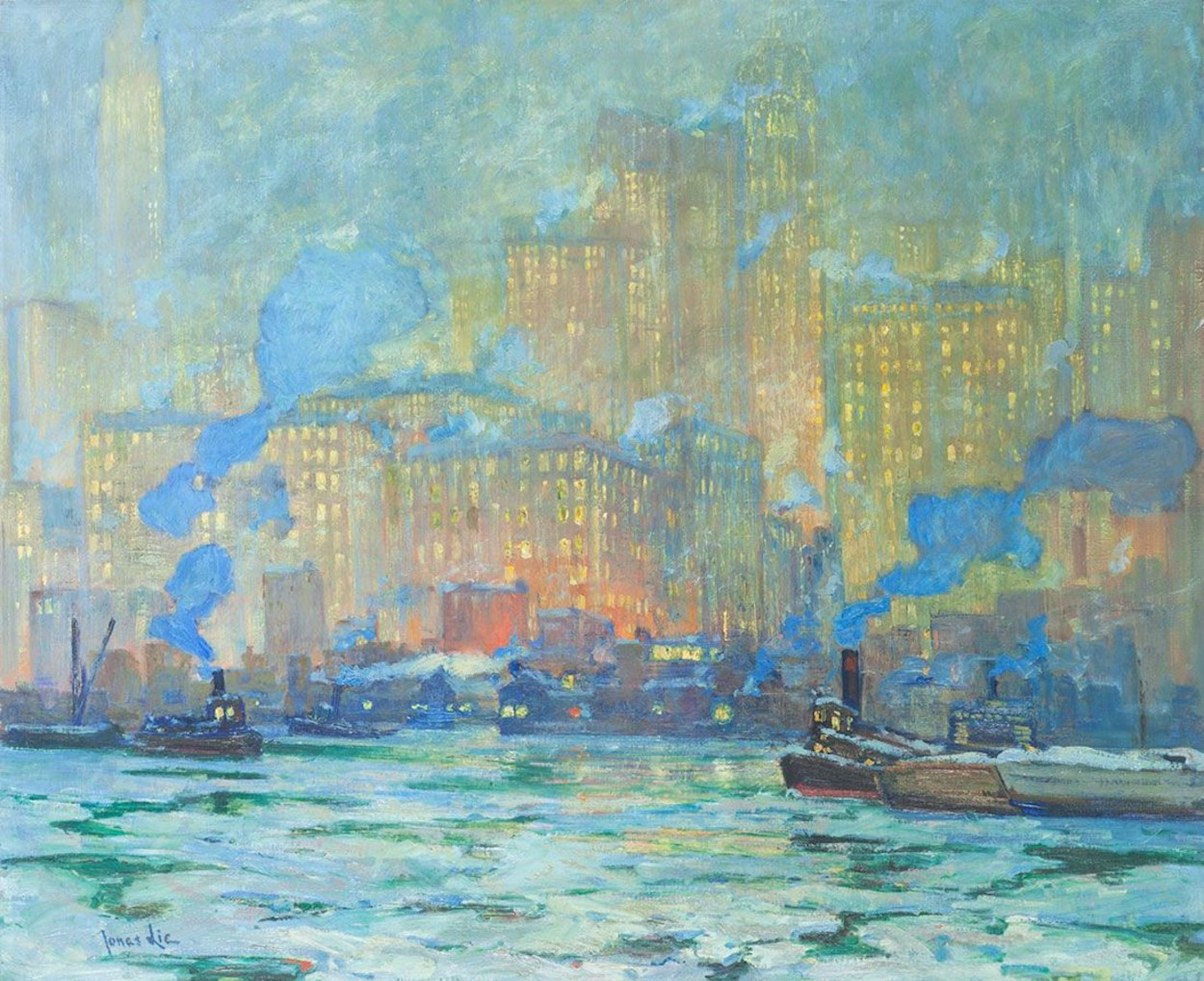
Afterglow, 1913 ca.

Lie traveled to Panama in 1913, to paint scenes of the construction of the Panama Canal. His thirty resulting canvases brought him wide acclaim. In 1929, twelve of these were donated to United States Military Academy in memory General George W. Goethals, the West Point graduate who had been the canal's chief engineer.

In 1932, King Haakon conferred on Lie Norway's highest civilian honor, making him a Knight of the Order of St. Olav.

Lie was a member of various art organizations including the Salmagundi Club and was active in the National Academy of Design. Among Lie's students was the New Hope School painter John Fulton Folinsbee.

Jonas Lie often depicted the sea, channels, and ships with dramatic perspective and powerful use of color. He became known for colorful impressionistic scenes of harbors and coves, painted during the many summers he spent on the coasts of New England and Canada. Throughout his prolific career he painted brilliantly colored images of the rocky coves and harbors that identify the region's dramatic shoreline. Lie painted a landscape mural in honor of his wife, Sonia, in the sanctuary of the First Unitarian Society of Plainfield, New Jersey in 1929. It is inscribed, "I will lift up mine eyes unto the hills." Paintings of Jonas Lie are on exhibit at art museums throughout the United States including at Utah Museum of Fine Arts; Cornell Fine Arts Museum; Phoenix Art Museum; San Diego Museum of Art; Corcoran Gallery of Art; Museum of Fine Arts, Boston; Brooklyn Museum of Art; Metropolitan Museum of Art; High Museum of Art; the Detroit Institute of Arts and at the Memorial Art Gallery.

== Honors, exhibitions and awards ==
Lie was elected an associate of the National Academy of Design in 1912, and a full member in 1925. He served as NAD's president from 1934 to 1939. He was invited to exhibit four paintings in New York City's 1913 Armory Show: The Black Teapot, At the Aquarium, A Hill Top, The Quarry.

=== Prizes ===
- St. Louis Purchase Exposition, silver medal for A Mill Race, 1904
- National Academy of Design, First Hallgarten Prize for Afterglow, 1914
- Panama–Pacific International Exposition, San Francisco, silver medal for The Gates of Pedro Miguel, 1915
- Newport Art Association, Richard Greenough Memorial Prize, Newport, RI, 1916
- Art Week, Philadelphia, gold medal, 1925
- Chicago Norske Klub, Bendickson Prize, 1920
- Chicago Norske Klub, Oscar H. Haugan Prize, 1927
- National Academy of Design, Carnegie Prize for The Cloud, 1927
- National Arts Club, Maida Gregg Memorial Prize, 1929
- Pennsylvania Academy of the Fine Arts, Jessie Sesnan Medal for Snow, 1935
- National Academy of Design, Saltus Medal for The Curtain Rises, 1936
- National Academy of Design, Obrig Prize for Rockbound Coast, 1937
- National Academy of Design, Saltus Medal for Old Smuggler's Cove, 1938
- 1939 New York World's Fair, third prize for Rockbound Coast, 1939

== Selected works ==
- A Mill Race (c.1903), Los Angeles County Museum of Art, Los Angeles, California. Awarded a silver medal at the 1904 St. Louis World's Fair
- View of the Seine (1909), Cummer Museum of Art and Gardens, Jacksonville, Florida
- The Black Teapot (1911), Everson Museum of Art, Syracuse, New York. Exhibited at the 1913 Armory show
- Morning on the River (c.1911-1912), Memorial Art Gallery as a gift from Ruth Sibley Gade in memory of James G. Averell, Rochester, New York
- Afterglow (c.1913), Art Institute of Chicago, Chicago, Illinois. Awarded NAD's 1914 First Hallgarten Prize
- Bridge and Tugs (c.1913), Georgia Museum of Art, Athens, Georgia
- The Bridge (1914), Dallas Museum of Art, Dallas, Texas
- Path of Gold (1914), High Museum of Art, Atlanta, Georgia
- The Old Ships Draw to Home Again (c.1920), Brooklyn Museum, Brooklyn, New York City
- When the Boats Come In (c.1921), Museum of Fine Arts, Boston, Massachusetts
- Out to Sea (c.1924), Cleveland Museum of Art, Cleveland, Ohio
- Blue and Silver (c.1925), National Academy of Design Museum, New York City
- The Headlands (c.1934), Montclair Art Museum, Montclair, New Jersey
- Snow (c.1935), Ex collection: Saint Louis Art Museum, St. Louis, Missouri. Awarded PAFA's 1935 Jessie Sesnan Medal. Auctioned at Christie's New York, 27 September 2011, Lot 43.
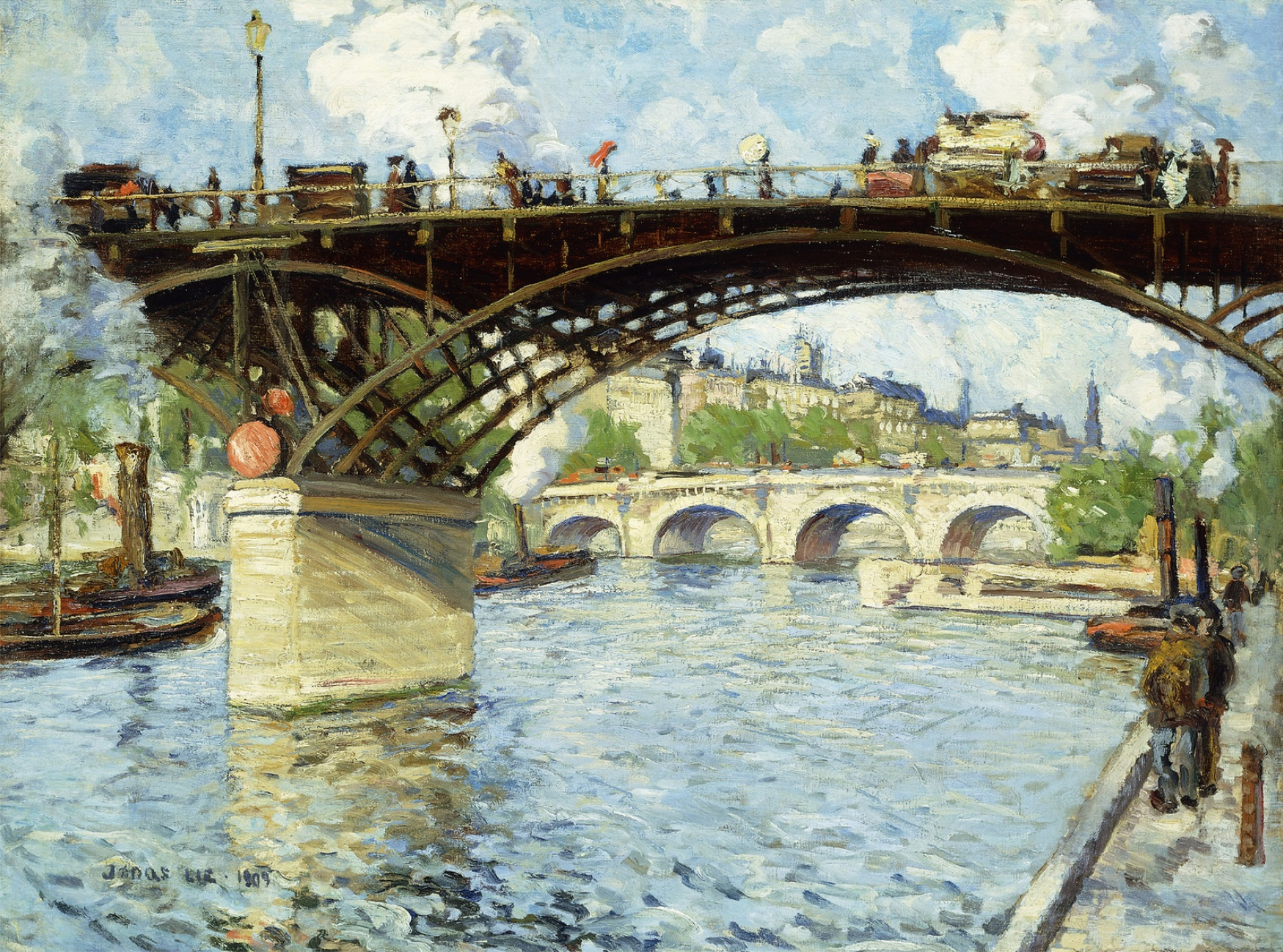
View of the Seine (1909), Cummer Museum of Art

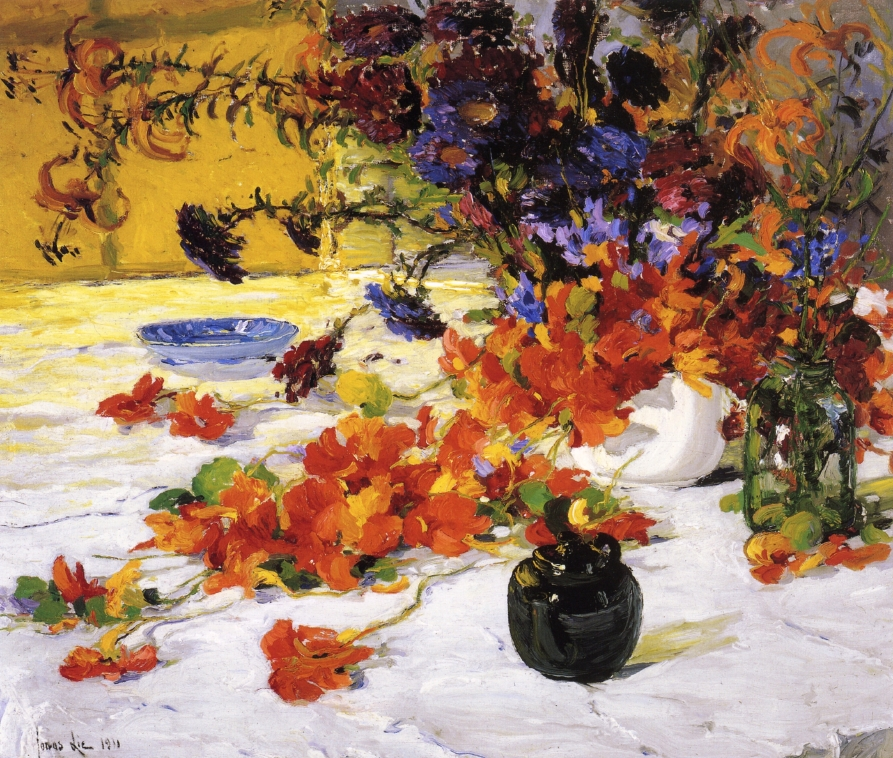
The Black Teapot (1911), Everson Museum of Art

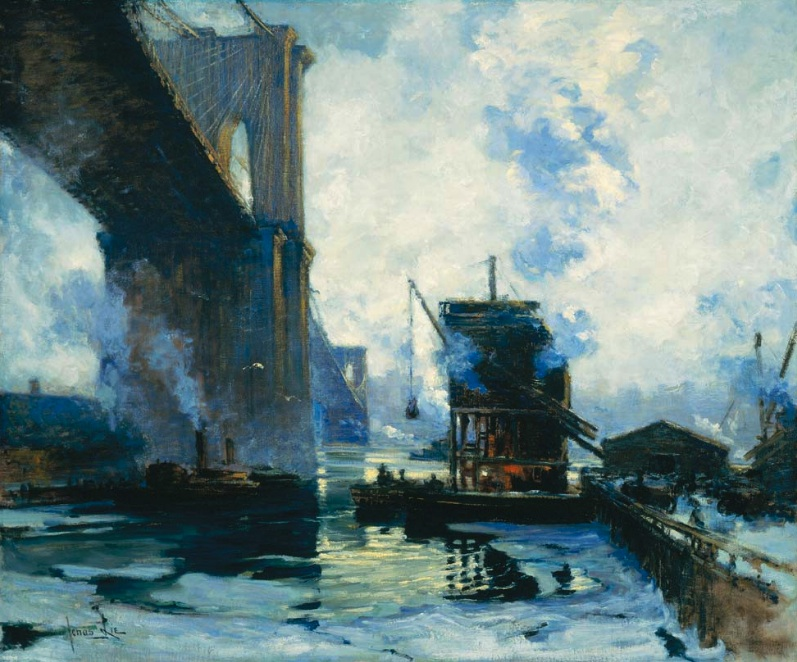
Morning On The River (ca. 1911-1912), Memorial Art Gallery, Rochester

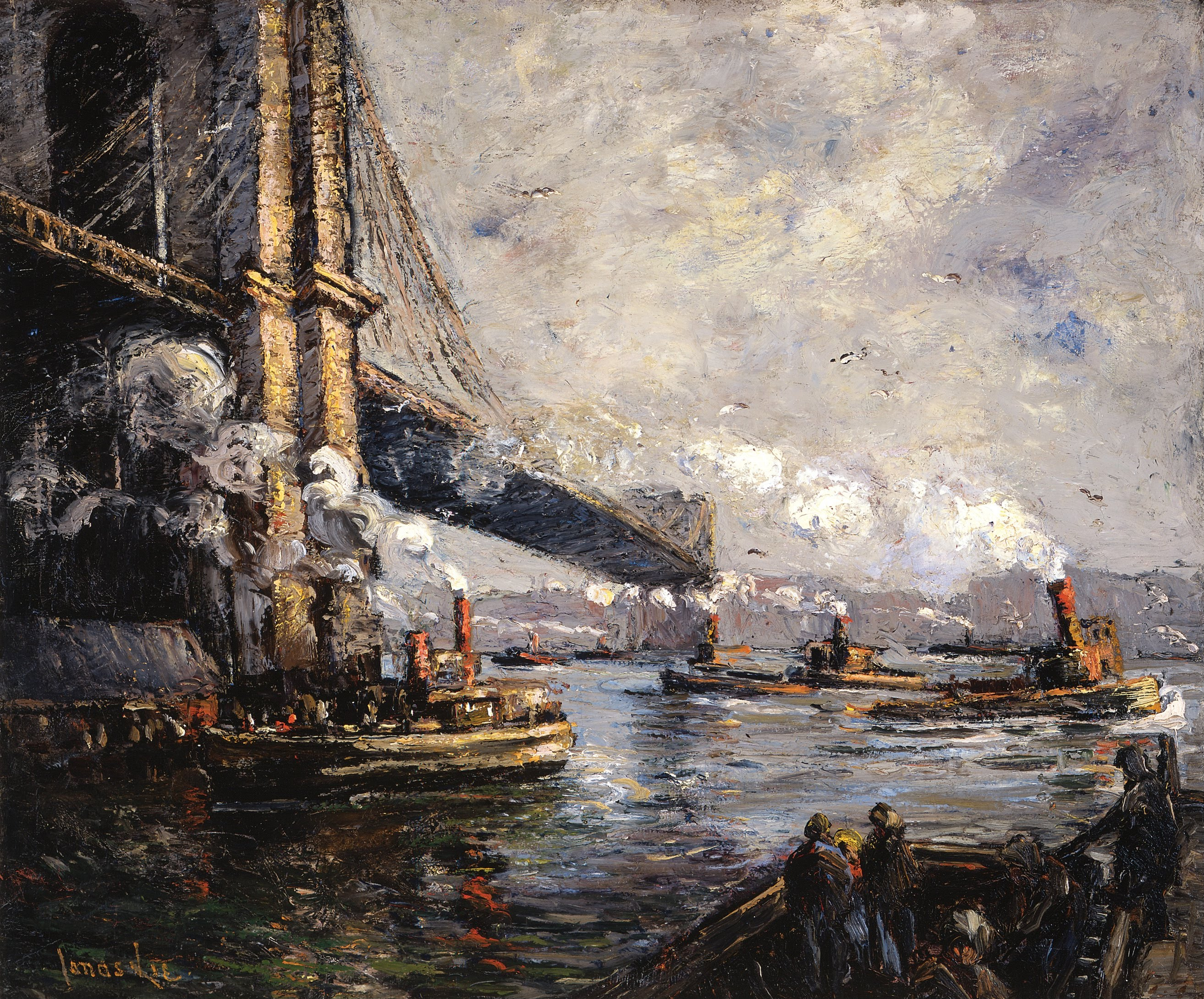
Bridge and Tugs (ca. 1913), Georgia Museum of Art

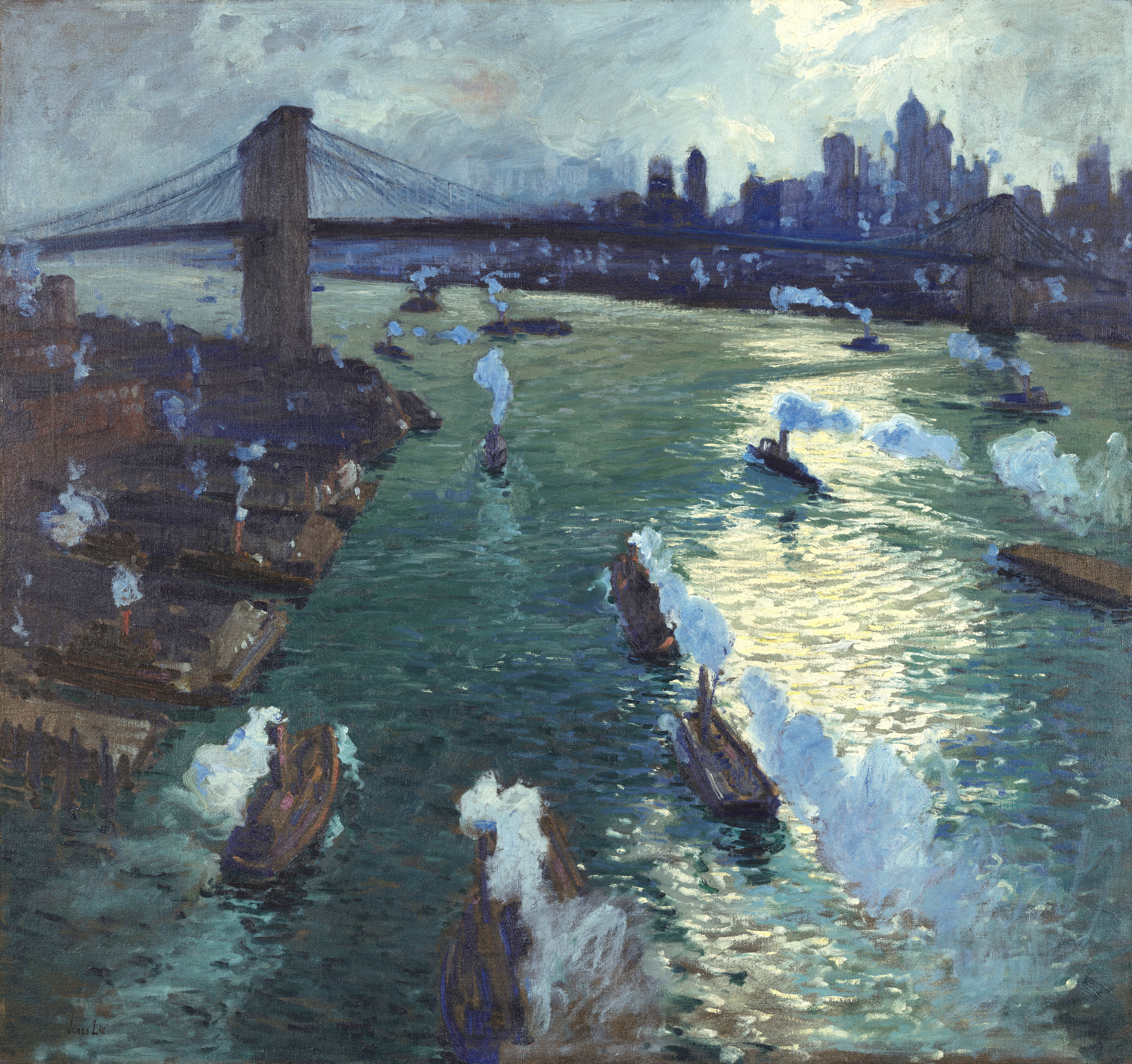
Path of Gold (1914), High Museum of Art, Atlanta

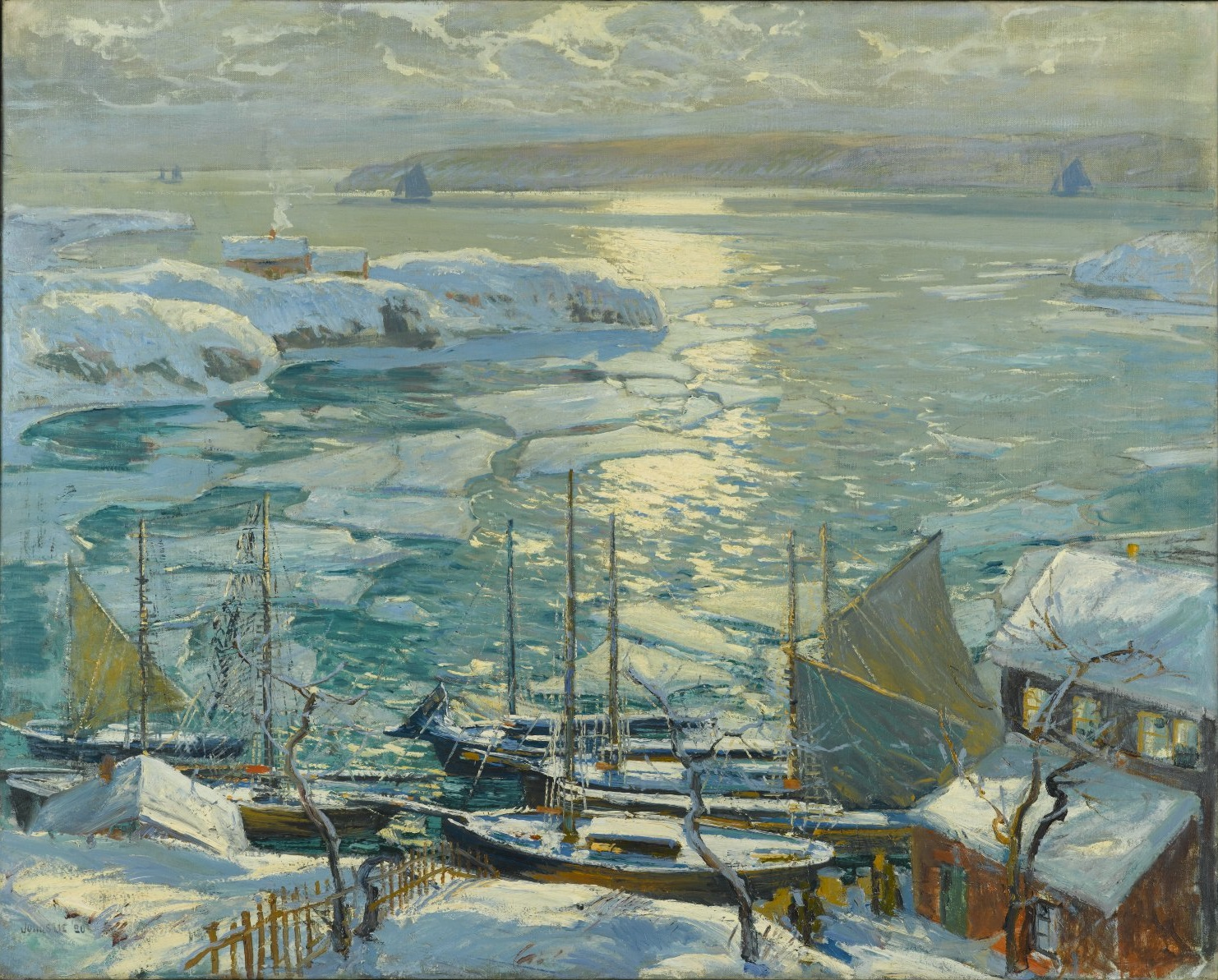
The Old Ships Draw to Home Again (ca. 1920), Brooklyn Museum

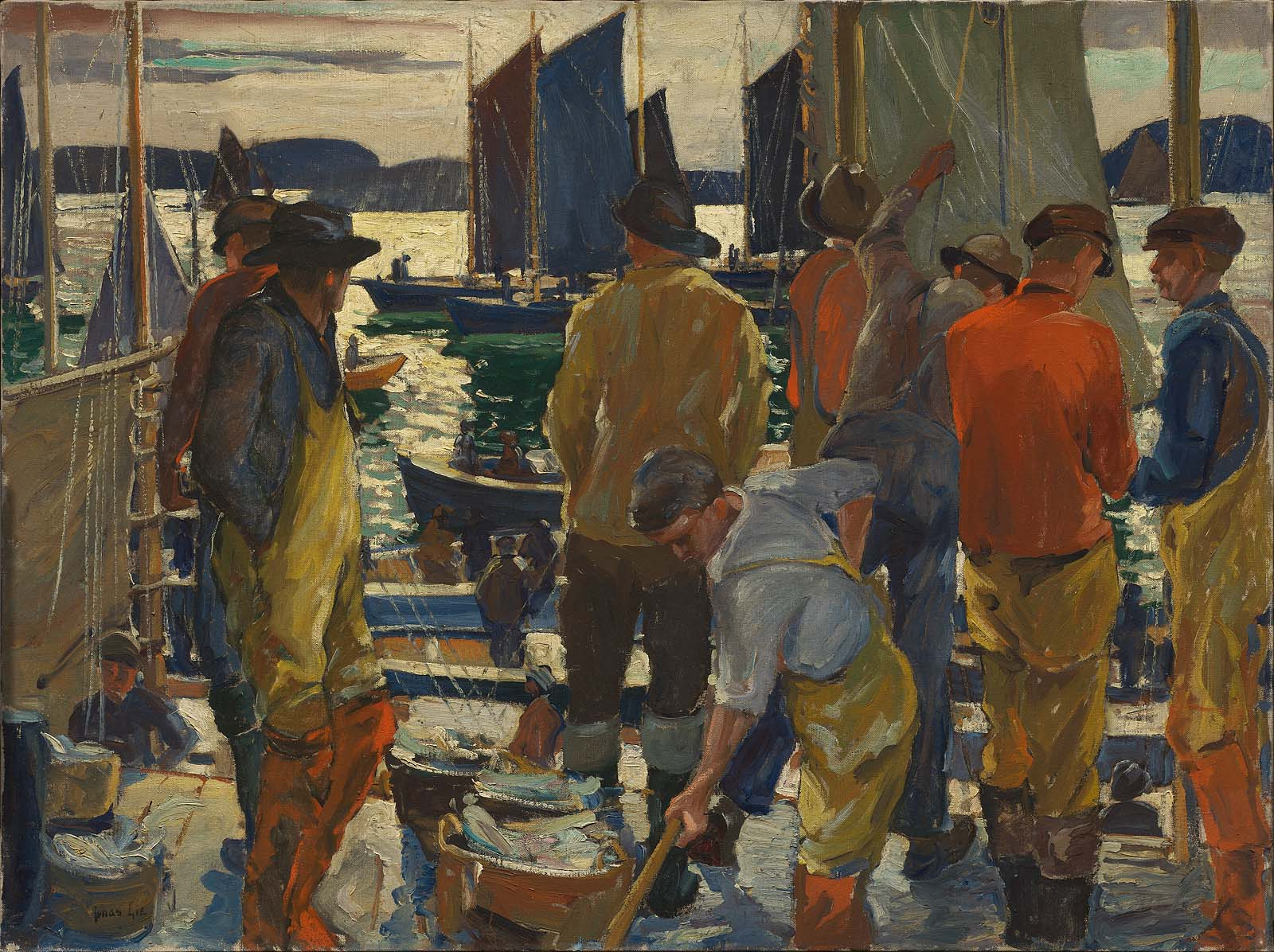
When the Boats Come In (ca. 1921), Museum of Fine Arts, Boston

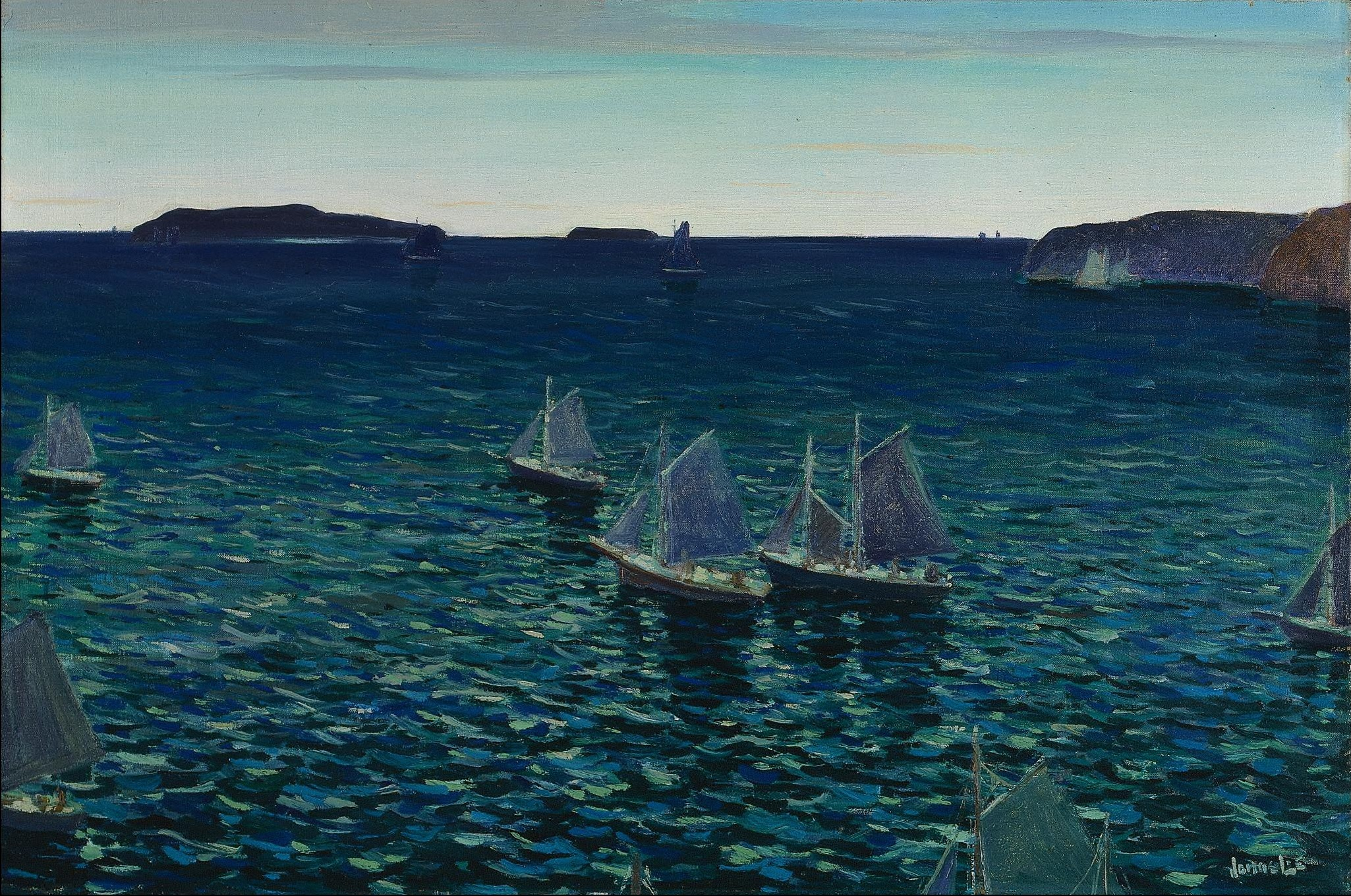
Out to Sea (ca. 1924), Cleveland Museum of Art

=== Panama Canal Series ===
Lie painted thirty large-scale canvases depicting construction of the Panama Canal. Twelve of them are at the U.S. Military Academy at West Point.

- The Conquerors (1913), Metropolitan Museum of Art, New York City
- Culebra Cut (1913), Detroit Museum of Art, Detroit, Michigan
- Toil (1913), United States Military Academy, West Point, New York
- The Gates of Pedro Miguel (1913), United States Military Academy, West Point, New York. Awarded a silver medal at the 1915 Panama–Pacific International Exposition.
- Crane at Miraflores (1913), United States Military Academy, West Point, New York
- Heavenly Hoist (1913), United States Military Academy, West Point, New York
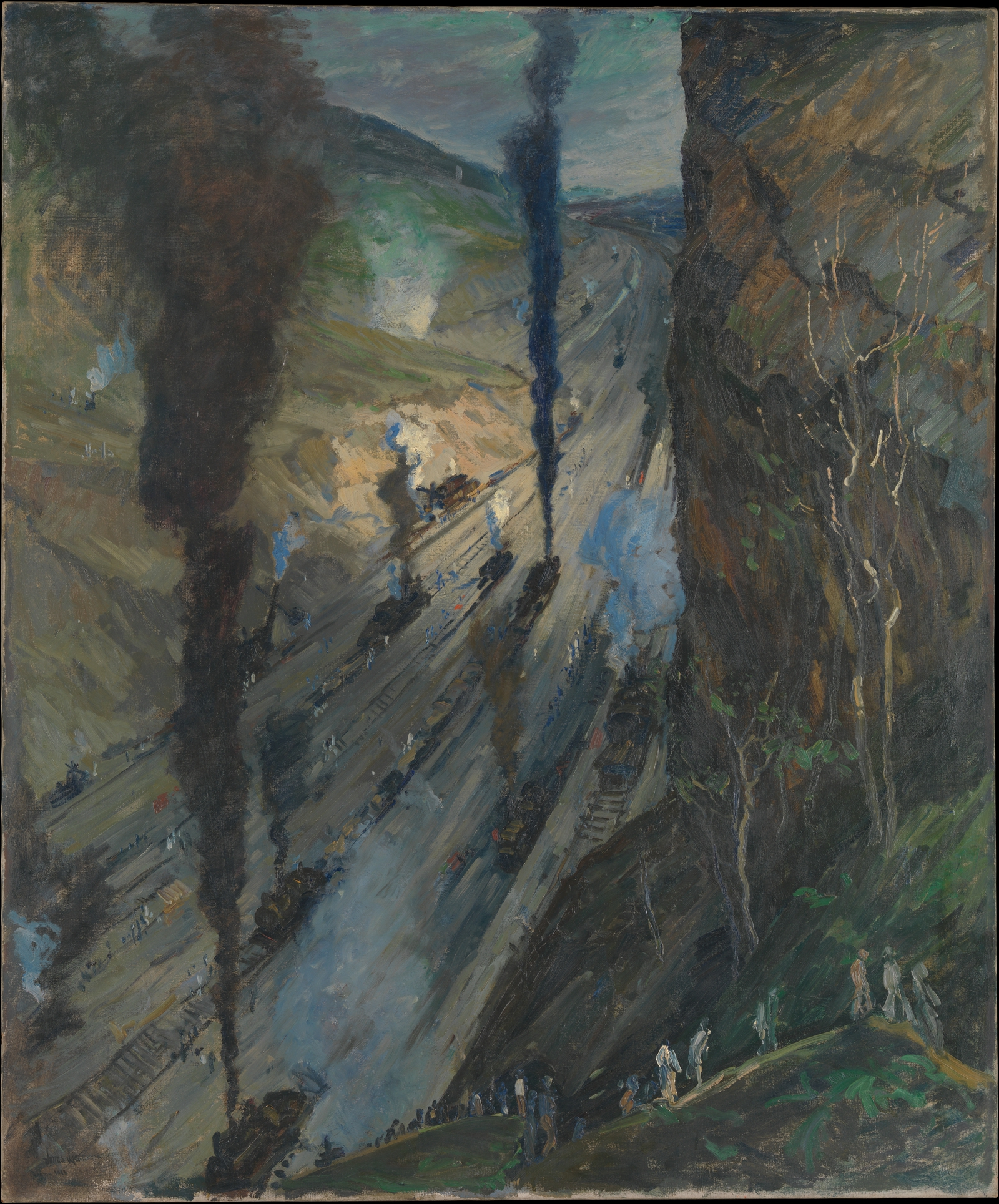
The Conquerors (1913), Metropolitan Museum of Art

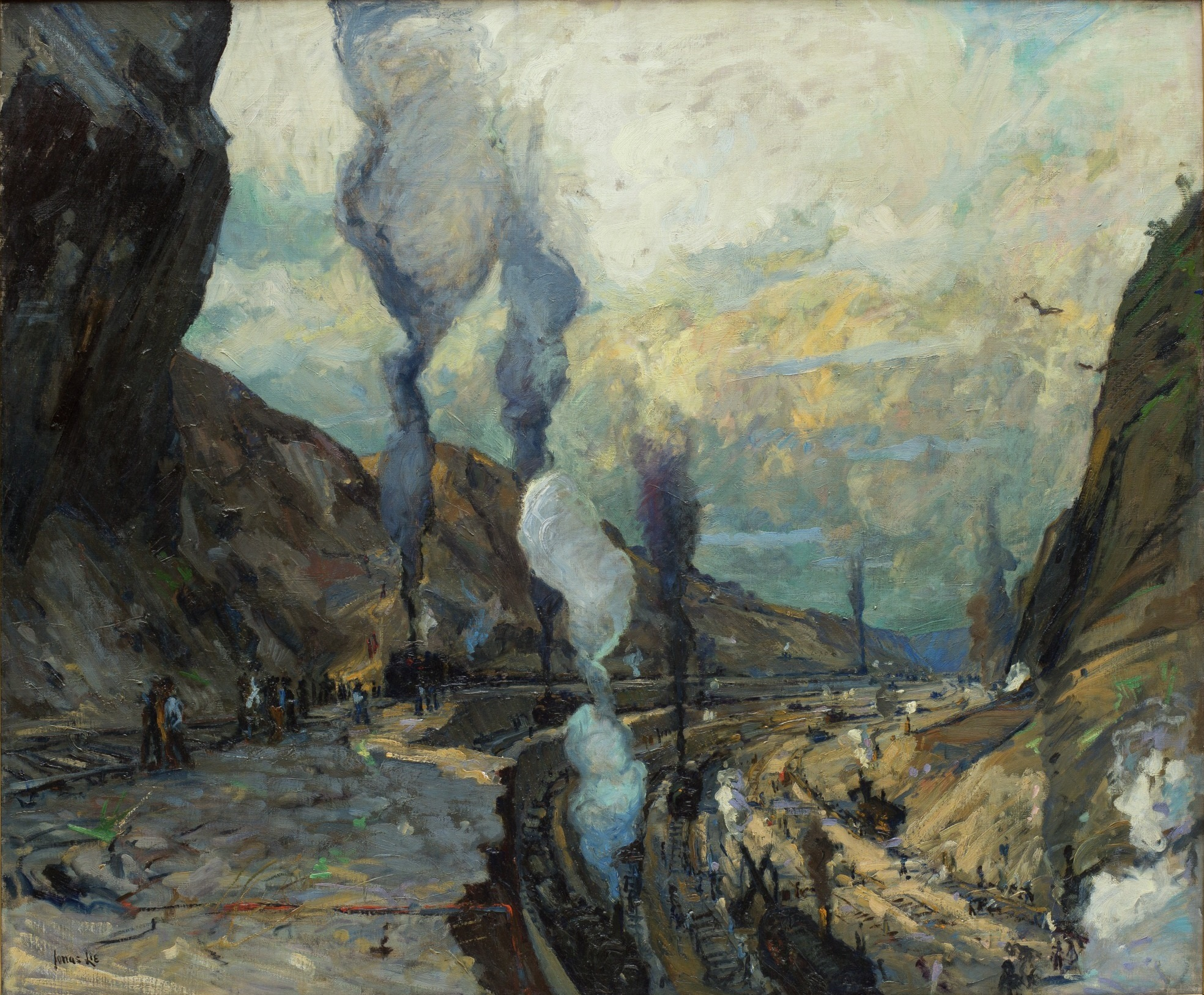
Culebra Cut (1913), Detroit Museum of Art

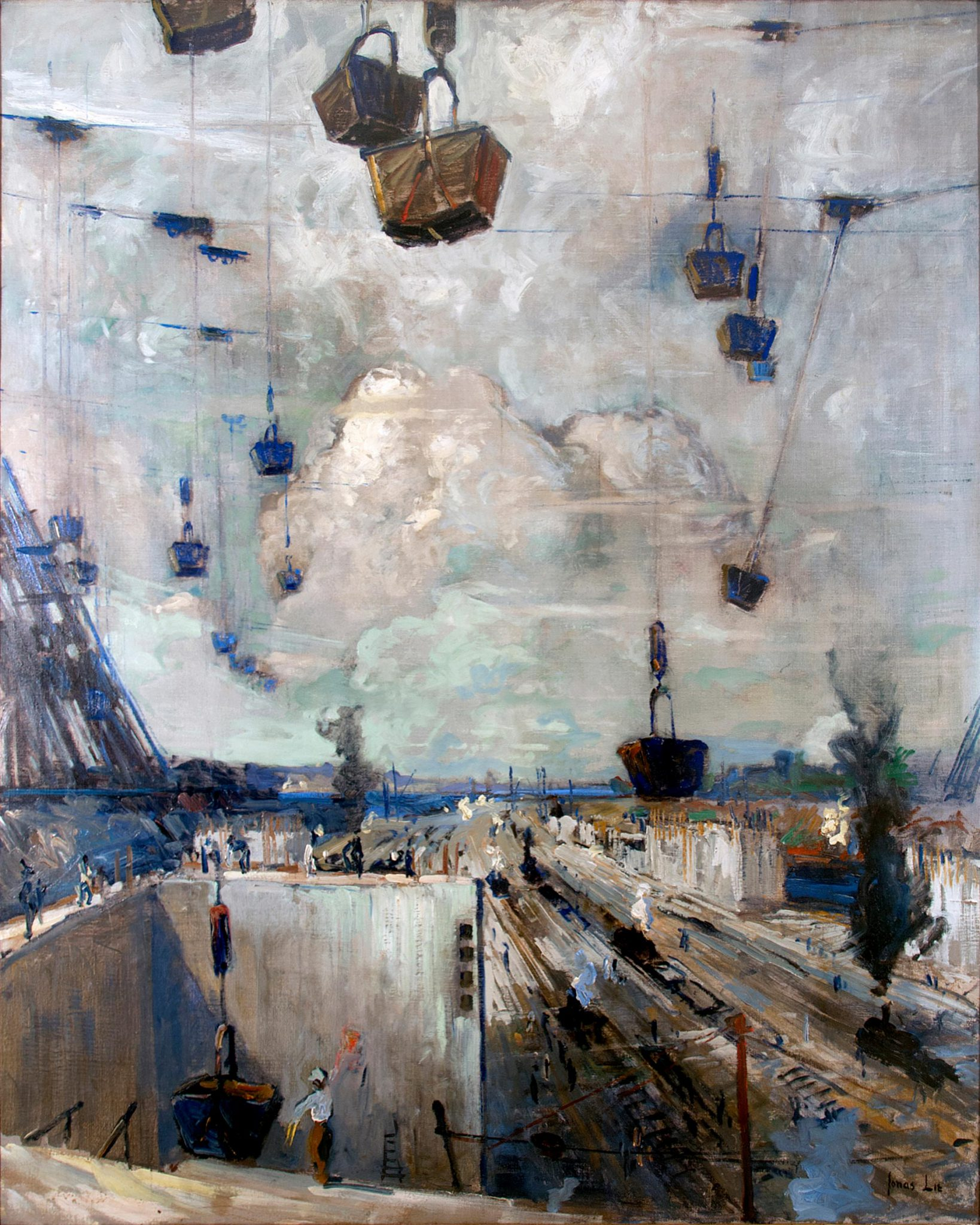
Heavenly Hoist (1913), West Point Museum

== Sources ==
- Biography of Jonas Lie by Dina Tolfsby, Curator of the Norwegian-American Collection, National Library of Norway. Published by the Norwegian chapter of the Norwegian-American Historical Association, Vol. XI, 285–311
- Haugan, Reidar Rye (1933) Prominent Artists and Exhibits of Their Work in Chicago (Chicago Norske Klub. Nordmanns-Forbundet, 24: 371–374, Volume 7)
- Lovoll, Odd S. (1988) A Century of Urban Life: the Norwegians in Chicago before 1930 (Northfield, MN: Norwegian-American Historical Association)
