= Eyolf Soot =

Norwegian painter

- Born: 24 April 1859; Aremark, Norway
- Died: 30 August 1928 (aged 69)
- Occupation: Painter
- Spouse: Inga Bjørnson
- Children: Botten Soot

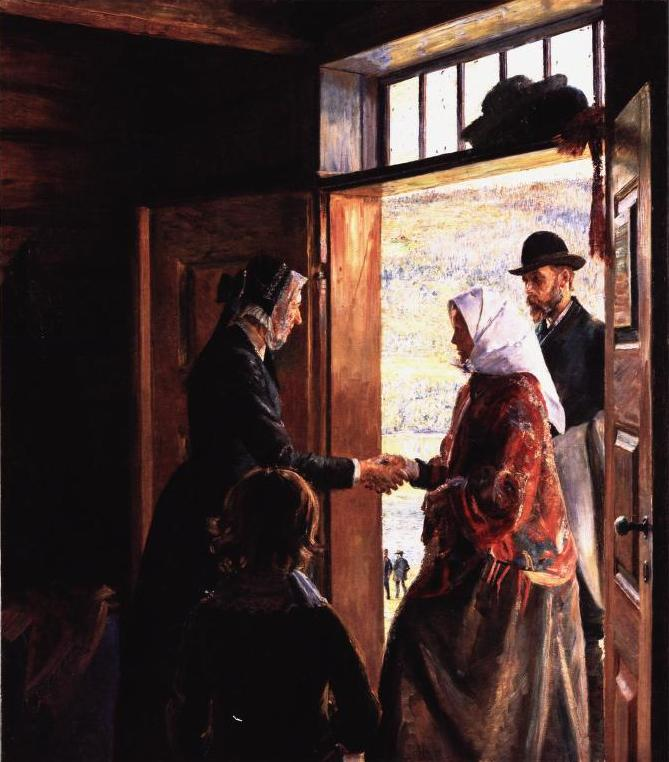
Welcome (1890)

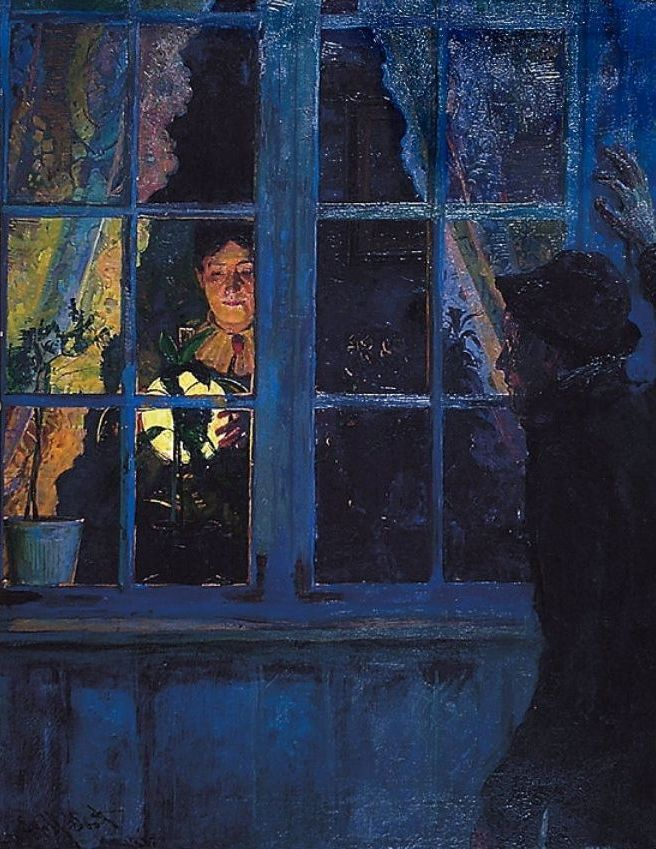
In the Lamplight (1895)

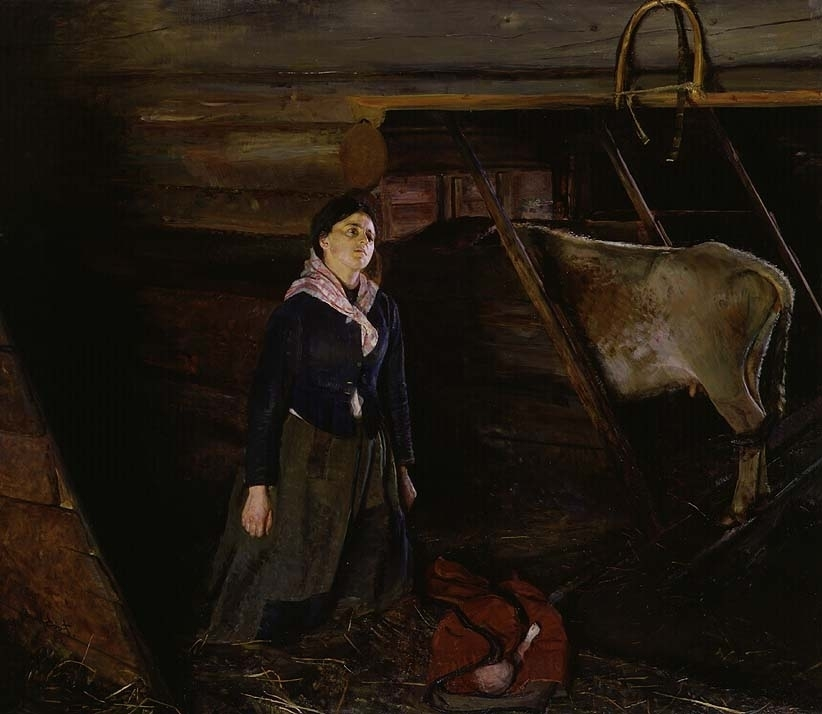
The Child Murderess (painting), (1895), Nasjonalmuseet

Eyolf Soot (24 April 1859 – 30 August 1928) was a Norwegian painter.

== Biography ==
Eyolf Soot was born in Aremark in Østfold, Norway. He was the grandson of engineer and canal builder, Engebret Soot. Large parts of childhood were spent in New York City where his father, Even Soot, worked as an engineer. His father died when Eyolf Soot was 17 years. Subsequently, his mother left with her the children for Norway. They first lived in Lillehammer before they moved to Christiania (now Oslo) where Soot continued his artistic education at the Royal Drawing School and at the painting school of Knud Bergslien.

In 1878, he spent five months at the Academy of Fine Arts, Karlsruhe in Berlin under Karl Gussow and three months later in 1881 under Gyula Benczúr at the academy in Munich. Later, he was a pupil of Léon Bonnat in Paris. In 1882, he debuted at the first Autumn Exhibition in Oslo. He later participated at the Exposition Universelle d'Anvers in Antwerp. Endowments gave Soot the opportunity to establish residence in Paris, where he was featured at the Exposition Universelle where he was honored with a silver medal.

The decade 1885-1895 was generally recognized as his most productive period. From 1887 to 1888, Soot worked in Paris. From 1888 to 1890, Soot settled on a farm south of Lillehammer where he captured local images and landscapes. Among Soot paintings from this period is Velkommen (‘’Welcome’’), now owned by the National Museum of Art, Architecture and Design, perhaps the most widely recognized of his works.

Eyolf Soot was married the actress Inga Bjørnson with whom he had a daughter, Botten Soot. The marriage was dissolved in 1900.

== Oil paintings ==
- Welcome, 1890, Nasjonalmuseet (Oslo)
- The Child Murderess, (1895), Nasjonalmuseet (Oslo)
