= Gjesteby =

Gjesteby is a Norwegian surname. Notable people with the surname include:

- Kari Gjesteby (born 1947), Norwegian politician, daughter of Omar
- Omar Gjesteby (1899–1979), Norwegian trade unionist and politician
