= Ola Heide =

Norwegian botanist

Ola Mikal Heide (born 26 April 1931) is a Norwegian botanist.

He was born in Trondenes. He graduated from the Norwegian College of Agriculture in 1961, and took the dr.agric. degree in 1967 with the thesis Studies on the Control of Regeneration in Begonia. He was appointed professor of plant physiology at the University of Tromsø in 1972, professor of botany at the Norwegian College of Agriculture in 1976. He served as rector there from 1978 to 1983. He is a fellow of the Norwegian Academy of Science and Letters.

Academic offices
Preceded by Lars Ketil Strand	Rector of the Norwegian College of Agriculture; 1978–1983	Succeeded by Arnor Njøs
