= Ål =

Ål Municipality Ål kommune
- Municipality
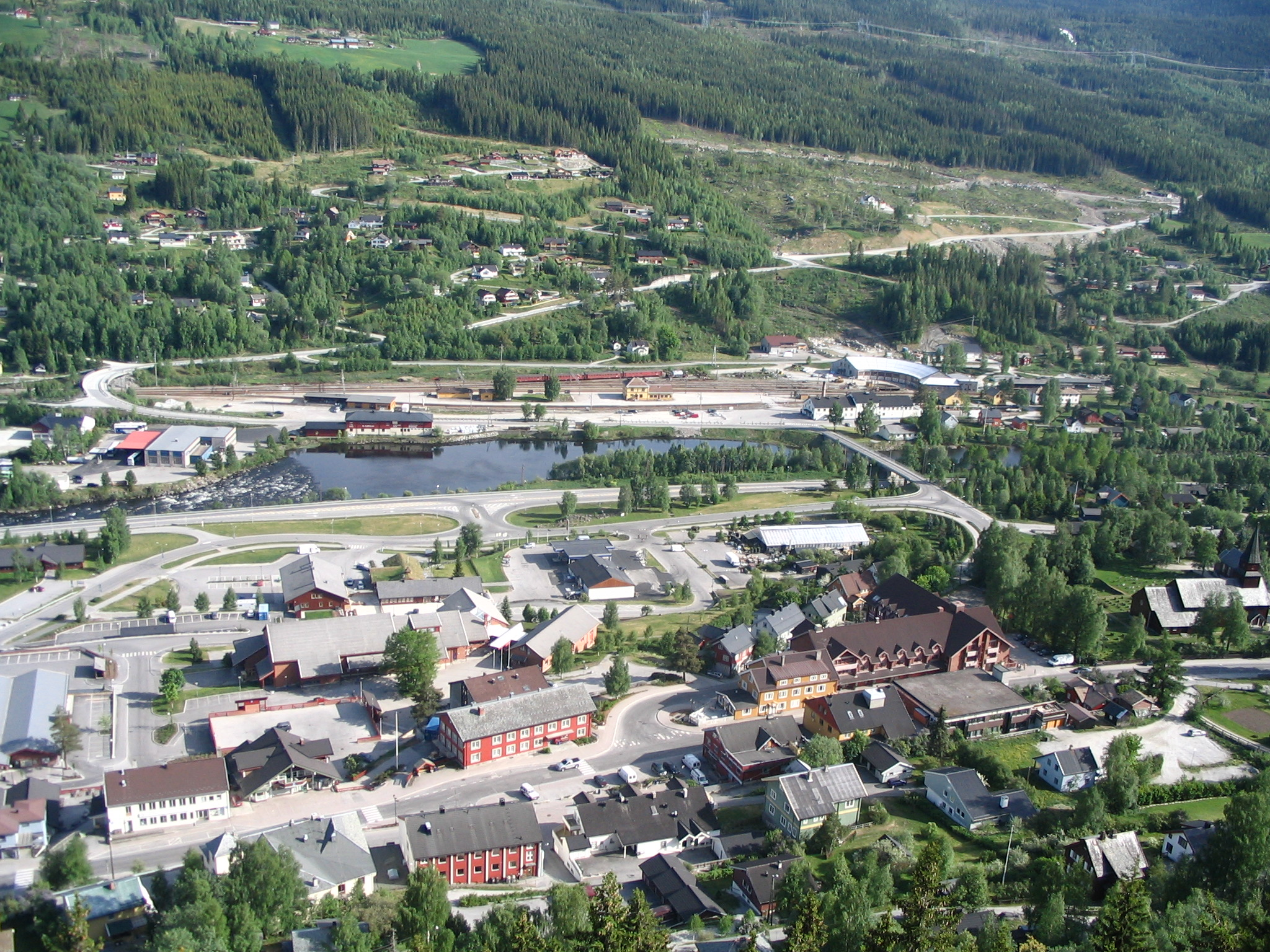

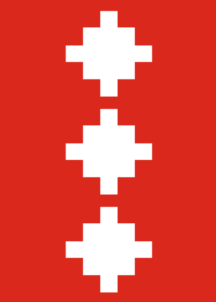
- Flag Coat of arms

- Buskerud within Norway

- Ål within Buskerud
- Coordinates: 60°37′49″N 8°33′40″E
- Country: Norway
- County: Buskerud
- District: Hallingdal
- Administrative centre: Ål

Government
  - Mayor (2025): Jørund Li (Conservative Party)

Area
  - Total: 1,171 km^{2} (452 sq mi)
  - Land: 1,081 km^{2} (417 sq mi)
  - Rank: #85 in Norway

Population (2015)
  - Total: 4,716
  - Rank: #207 in Norway
  - Density: 4/km^{2} (10/sq mi)
- Demonym: Åling

Official language
  - Norwegian form: Nynorsk
- Time zone: UTC+01:00 (CET)
  - Summer (DST): UTC+02:00 (CEST)
- ISO 3166 code: NO-3328
- Website: Official website

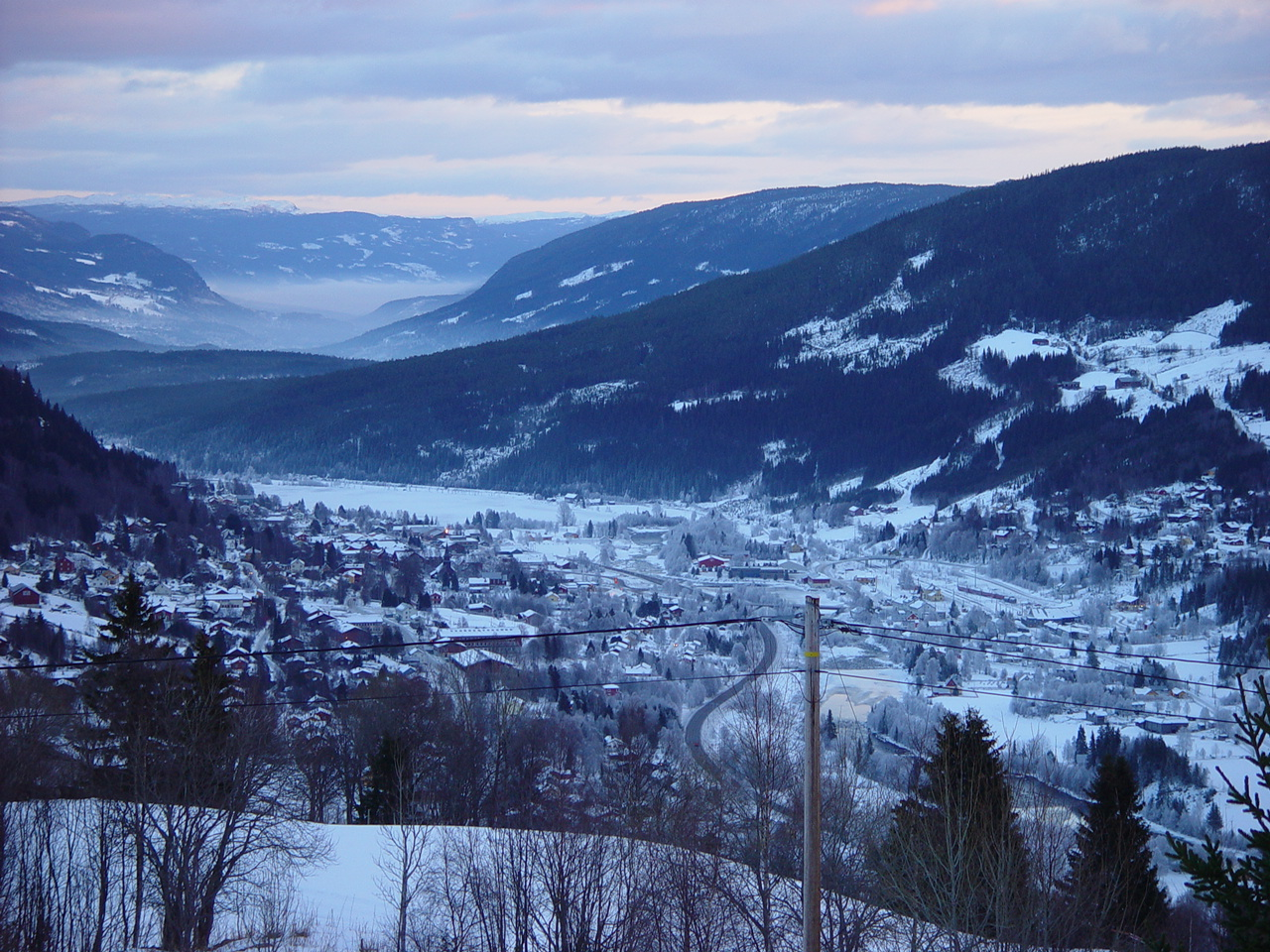
Village of Ål in winter

Ål is a municipality in Buskerud county, Norway. It is part of the traditional region of Hallingdal. The administrative centre of the municipality is the village of Ål. The parish of Aal was established as a municipality on 1 January 1838 (see formannskapsdistrikt). The area of Hol was separated from the municipality of Aal in 1877 to become a separate municipality.

== Geography ==
80% of Ål municipality is at least 900 meters (3,000 ft) above sea level. The highest point is Raudbergnuten at 1,819 meters (5,968 ft). Reineskarvet, the significant mountain of Ål has a summit of 1,791 meters (5,876 ft). In the winter, Ål has over 400 kilometers (250 mi) of maintained cross country ski trails.

Ål borders the municipalities of Hol, Gol, Hemsedal, Nesbyen, Nore og Uvdal, and Lærdal Municipality.

The Bergen Line, the rail line between Oslo and Bergen runs through Ål. Ål Station has an elevation of 436 meters (1,430 ft) and is the halfway station on the Bergen Line.

Hallingdalselva runs in the bottom of the main valley, forming Strandafjorden, a long, narrow lake for several kilometers. Ål has several hydroelectric dams. Hallingdalselva runs partly in a tunnel from here to Nes municipality, where it drives a large turbine power plant.

=== Mountains ===
- Djupeskardnosi
- Fossebreen
- Haldalshøgdi
- Haldalsnuten
- Langebottfjellet
- Lysebottnuten
- Mellomnuten
- Skoddenosi

== General information ==
Approximately 5,000 inhabitants spread over several smaller villages including Ål, Torpo, Leveld, Vats, Trillhus, Granhagen, Breie and Strand. There is a strong cultural tradition, with folk music being a big part of people's identity. Folkemusikkveka is held every May for a week.

The traditional industry of Ål is mostly small-farming. Many livestock farms are still in operation with small herds of sheep, dairy cattle, and goats. Crop growing is difficult because of the steep valley walls, but wheat, barley, rye, and potatoes have all been grown in the past.

The award-winning local paper Hallingdølen has offices in the village of Ål. It comes on Tuesdays, Thursdays, and Saturdays. Ål has a Videregående school and a Folkehøyskole for deaf students.

=== Name ===
The Old Norse form of the name was Áll. The name is identical with the word áll which means "ditch" or "gully". In 1921, the spelling of the name was changed from "Aal" to "Ål".

=== Coat-of-arms ===
The coat-of-arms is from modern times. The arms were granted on 30 November 1984 and show three silver diamond shapes in a vertical line on a red background. The designs are taken from an old and common pattern used in hand-woven tapestries in the area. They also symbolize the three churches in the municipality: Ål, Torpo, and Leveld.

Number of minorities (1st and 2nd generation) in Ål by country of origin in 2020
Ancestry	Number
Poland	166
Eritrea	68
Denmark	18
Somalia	16
Sweden	16

== Attractions ==
- Torpo Stave Church (built around 1190–1200) is located in Torpo
- Ål Bygdamuseum is built around the old Leksvol farm, and is typical of the area. The buildings go back to the 17th century. In later years the museum gained additional buildings, Øvre tunet, Stølen, and Husmannsplassen, where a stone cottage has been reconstructed, similar to those used in the mountain sæter.
- Hallingdal feriepark, camping with high ropes course and activities
- Ål Skisenter, downhill skiing facility

== Notable people from Ål ==
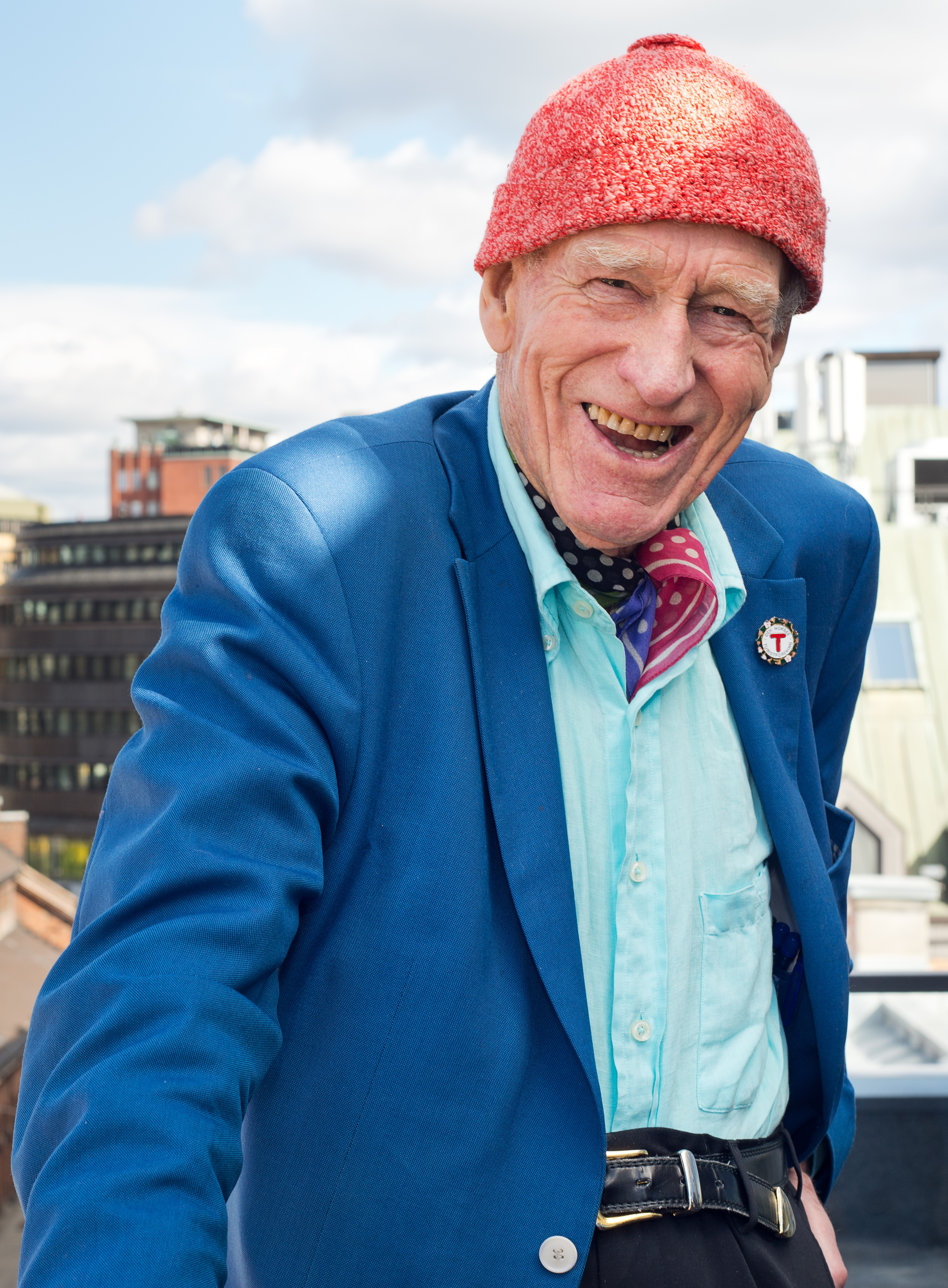
Olav Thon, 2013

- Hallgrim Berg (born 1945), folk musician and politician
- Lars T. Bjella (1922–2013), politician, active in Ål local politics for 25 years
- Stein Torleif Bjella (born 1968), songwriter, singer, and guitarist
- Nils Terje Dalseide (1952–2018), judge and civil servant
- Kristian Hefte (1905–1977), actor
- Trond Helleland (born 1962), politician
- Odd Hoftun (born 1927), engineer and missionary to Nepal
- Eldbjørg Løwer (born 1943), politician
- Mikkel Ødelien (1893–1984), scientist, educator and soil researcher
- Einfrid Perstølen (1917–2017), psychiatrist and Nynorsk language proponent
- Olle Eksell (born Carl Olof Lennart 1918–2007), graphic designer
- Ambjørg Sælthun (1922–2012), farmer and politician
- Ole Larsen Skattebøl (1844–1929), judge and politician
- Embrik Strand (1876–1947), entomologist and arachnologist
- Olav Thon (1923-2024), real estate developer and billionaire
- Solveig Vestenfor (born 1973), mayor and member of parliament

== Sister cities ==
The following cities are twinned with Ål:

- - Sololá, Sololá Department, Guatemala

== See also ==
- Gråhyrnerene
