= Lars Ketil Strand =

Norwegian forester (1924–2020)

Lars Ketil Strand (11 May 1924 – 12 March 2020) was a Norwegian forester.

He was born in Kristiania in May 1924. He took the Dr. Agric. degree in 1959, and worked at the Norwegian Forest Research Institute from 1965. He was then a professor at the Norwegian College of Agriculture from 1968 to 1990. He served as rector there from 1971 to 1977. He also has an honorary degree from the University of Helsinki. He died in March 2020 at the age of 95.

Academic offices
Preceded by Jul Låg	Rector of the Norwegian College of Agriculture; 1971–1977	Succeeded by Ola Mikal Heide
