= Jul Låg =

Norwegian professor and soil researcher (1915–2000)

Jul Låg (13 November 1915 - 2 February 2000) was a Norwegian scientist and soil researcher.

== Biography ==
He was born in Flesberg in Buskerud, Norway. He grew up on the farm in Flesberg. After elementary school he was a farm laborer for several years. He took the dr.agric. degree in 1949. He also studied geology at the University of Oslo (1942–43). He studied under graduate fellowships and scholarships from (1942–45).

He examined and described the rare Norwegian soil types, including rendzina-like soil. Låg has examined the supply of plant nutrients in precipitation in Norway. He hired scientists in the field both at home and abroad, organized annual symposia where he gave several speeches, and he edited the books where the various contributions were published. An area of research, which he started just before he retired, was the impact of soil and rock properties on human and animal health.

Jul Låg was a professor at the Norwegian College of Agriculture from 1949 to 1985. He served as rector there from 1968 to 1971. He was the praeces of the Norwegian Academy of Science and Letters from 1976 to 1984. He was a member and chairman of several public councils, boards, committees, both Norwegian and international, including Chairman of the Board of the Nordic Association of Agriculture Researchers 1957-59 and 1972–79, the Inter-Nordic Committee for Geomedisinsk Research 1978–1984, the Agricultural Scientific Research 1972-1973 and The Research Councils in 1972–73.

Jul Låg was a member of the Norwegian Academy of Science from 1953 and alternately the President of the Academy from 1976 to 1984. He was made a member of the Royal Norwegian Scientific Society in 1984, The Royal Danish Scientific Ernes Society from 1982 and a number of other foreign societies. Låg was appointed a Knight of the 1st Class of the Royal Norwegian Order of St. Olav (1984), he was Commander of the Icelandic Order of the Falcon (1970) and received the Copernicus Medal from the Polish Academy of Sciences (1974).

Academic offices
Preceded by Gotfred Kvifte	Rector of the Norwegian College of Agriculture; 1968–1971	Succeeded by Lars Ketil Strand
