= Mikkel Ødelien =

Norwegian scientist, educator and soil researcher

Mikkel Ødelien (5 October 1893 – 11 February 1984) was a Norwegian scientist, educator and soil researcher.

He was born in Ål, Buskerud County, Norway. He took the cand.agric. degree in 1918, and published the journal Årbok for beitebruk from 1919 to 1930. He was then a professor at the Norwegian College of Agriculture located in Ås, in Akershus County, Norway from 1932 to 1962. He served as rector there from 1954 to 1956. During 1967 he was engaged by the Norwegian Agency for Development Cooperation in Madagascar.

He contributed new knowledge in almost all areas of soil culture, but particularly important for Norwegian agriculture was the new knowledge on fertilizing, micronutrients and heavy metals.

Mikkel Ødelien was made a member of the Norwegian Academy of Science and Letters in 1950 and was appointed a Knight of the 1st Class of the Royal Norwegian Order of St. Olav in 1959. He was a member of several international science academies and companies and an honorary doctorate by the Royal Lantbrukshögskolan in Uppsala University (1962).

Academic offices
Preceded by	Rector of the Norwegian College of Agriculture; 1954–1956	Succeeded by Håkon Wexelsen
