= Gotfred Kvifte =

Norwegian physicist

Gotfred Ingolf Kvifte (1914, Froland, Aust-Agder – 1997) was a Norwegian physicist.

He was born in Froland Municipality. He took the dr.philos. degree in 1953, and worked as a lecturer at the University of Bergen for one year. He was then a professor at the Norwegian College of Agriculture from 1954 to 1984. He served as rector there from 1961 to 1968.

Academic offices
Preceded by Håkon Wexelsen	Rector of the Norwegian College of Agriculture; 1961–1968	Succeeded by Jul Låg
