= Svein Longva =

Norwegian economist and civil servant

Svein Longva (20 December 1943 – 16 April 2009) was a Norwegian economist and civil servant.

== Biography ==
He was born in Oslo, but his family moved to Volda in 1950. After completing his secondary education there in 1962, he enrolled in political economy studies at the University of Oslo. Here, he was briefly involved in the Norwegian Labour Party student group, which was dominated by later politicians like Gudmund Hernes and Einar Førde. After graduating with the cand.oecon. degree, he was hired in Statistics Norway in 1968, was promoted to research director in 1984 and was managing director from 1991 to 2004. He was also a visiting scholar at Harvard University for a brief period in the 1970s. He served as State Conciliator of Norway from 2005 to 2009. In February 2009 he was relieved due to illness and replaced by Geir Engebretsen. Not long after, in April 2009, Longva died.

Civic offices
Preceded by Reidar Webster	State Conciliator of Norway; 2005–2009	Succeeded by Kari Gjesteby
