= Håkon Wexelsen =

Norwegian botanist (1898–1979)

Håkon Wexelsen (9 August 1898–26 June 1979) was a Norwegian plant geneticist.

He was born at Bærum in Akershus, Norway. He took the dr.agric. degree in 1946, and was a professor at the Norwegian College of Agriculture from 1947 to 1968. He served as rector there from 1957 to 1960.

Academic offices
Preceded by Mikkel Ødelien	Rector of the Norwegian College of Agriculture; 1957–1960	Succeeded by Gotfred Kvifte
