= Haldalsnuten =

Mountain in Norway

Coordinates: 60°50′51″N 7°51′35″E

Highest point
- Elevation: 1,764.7 m (5,790 ft)
- Prominence: 310.9 m (1,020 ft)
- Isolation: 8.73 km (5.42 mi) to Gråhyrnerene

Geography
- Location: Buskerud, Norway

Haldalsnuten is a mountain in the municipality of Ål in Buskerud, Norway.
