= Arnor Njøs =

Norwegian soil scientist (1930–2019)

Arnor Njøs (21 June 1930 – 1 May 2019) was a Norwegian soil scientist.

He was born in Leinstrand Municipality. He graduated from the Norwegian College of Agriculture in 1955, and took the M.Sc. degree at the University of Illinois in 1961. He was a professor at the Norwegian College of Agriculture from 1979 to 1989, serving as rector from 1984 to 1989, and headed the Norwegian Centre for Soil and Environmental Research from 1990 to 1995.

He was decorated as a Knight, First Class of the Order of St. Olav in 1997. In 1998 an honorary degree at the Swedish University of Agricultural Sciences was bestowed upon him. He died in 2019.

Academic offices
Preceded by Ola Mikal Heide	Rector of the Norwegian College of Agriculture; 1984–1989	Succeeded by
