= Mellomnuten =

Mountain in Norway

Coordinates: 60°49′38″N 8°8′34″E

Geography
- Location: Buskerud, Norway

Mellomnuten is a mountain located in the municipality of Ål in Buskerud, Norway.
