= Geir Engebretsen =

Norwegian jurist and civil servant

Geir Engebretsen (born 22 March 1952) is a Norwegian jurist and civil servant.

He was born in Oslo, and graduated with the cand.jur. degree in 1978. He was a subdirector and head of department in the Ministry of Justice and the Police from 1985 to 1991, except for the years 1987 to 1989 when he worked in the county governor office. He was also acting County Governors of Oslo and Akershus, as Gunnar Alf Larsen left in 1988 and Kåre Willoch could not assume the position until 1989.

Engebretsen was then a judge in Asker og Bærum District Court from 1991 to 2001, district stipendiary magistrate of Nedre Romerike from 2001 to 2005 and district stipendiary magistrate of Oslo from 2005. In February 2009 he became acting State Conciliator of Norway. due to Svein Longva's illness. When Longva died in April 2009, he continued to hold the office. In August 2009 Kari Gjesteby was appointed to the position.

He resides in Jar.

Civic offices
Preceded by Gunnar Alf Larsen	County Governor of Oslo and Akershus (acting); 1988–1989	Succeeded by Kåre Willoch
Preceded by Svein Longva	State Conciliator of Norway (acting); 2009	Succeeded by Kari Gjesteby
