= Djupeskardnosi =

Mountain in Norway

Coordinates: 60°54′43″N 7°51′06″E

Highest point
- Elevation: 1,711 m (5,614 ft)

Geography
- Location: Buskerud, Norway

Djupeskardnosi is a mountain in Ål municipality in Buskerud, Norway. It has an altitude of 1,711 meters above sea level and is the 699th highest mountain in Norway with prominence of at least 50 meters.
