= Eivind Dale =

Norwegian civil servant

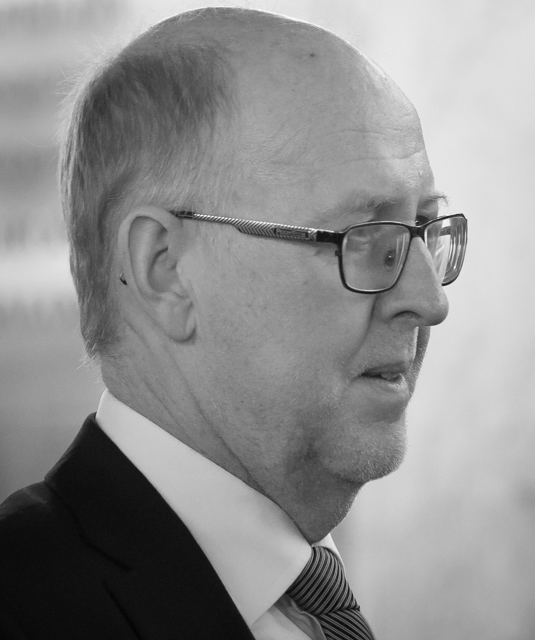
Eivind Dale (born 1955) civil servant from Norway. One of many guests at Governor Øystein Olsen's annual address in February 2017.

Eivind Dale (born 20 July 1955) is a Norwegian civil servant.

He has a cand.agric. degree from the Norwegian College of Agriculture in 1979, and has spent most of his career in the Norwegian Ministry of Local Government and Regional Development. He was promoted to deputy under-secretary of state in 2000 and then permanent under-secretary of state in 2006; the highest-ranking civil position in a Norwegian ministry. He had been acting in the position since 2005.
