= State Conciliator of Norway =

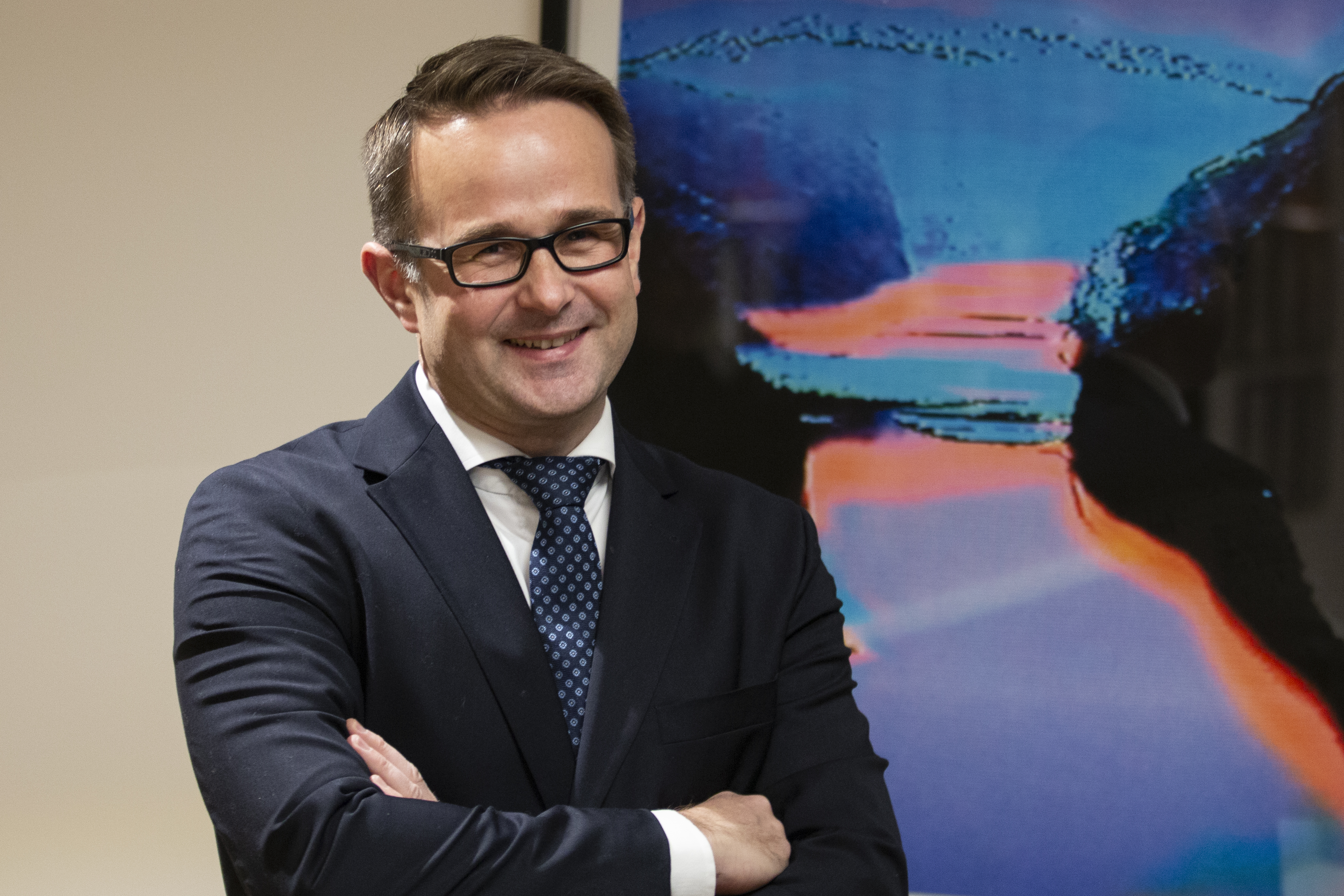
Mats Wilhelm Ruland (current national mediator)

The National Mediator of Norway (Norwegian: Riksmekleren, until 2012 Riksmeklingsmannen) is a mediator's office of Norway. It is invoked in labour disputes, in other words when creation or revision of tariff agreements is disagreed upon.

It was established in 1915, and the first National Mediator took office in 1916. The headquarters are in Oslo.

== List of National Mediators of Norway ==
This is a list of the National Mediators of Norway:

- 1916–1920 : Jens Michael Lund
- 1920–1921 : Vilhelm Lie
- 1921–1922 : Paul Ivar Paulsen
- 1922–1930 : Valentin Voss
- 1931–1945 : Andreas Claussen
- 1946–1948 : Paal Berg
- 1948–1954 : Henrik Lundh
- 1954–1964 : Thoralf Evje
- 1965–1974 : Preben Munthe
- 1975–1981 : Konrad B. Knutsen
- 1982–1988 : Bjørn Haug
- 1988–2004 : Reidar Webster
- 2005–2009 : Svein Longva
- 2009–2009 : Geir Engebretsen (acting)
- 2009–2013 : Kari Gjesteby
- 2013–2018 : Nils Terje Dalseide
- 2018–present : Mats Wilhelm Ruland
