= Nils Terje Dalseide =

Norwegian judge and civil servant (1952–2018)

- Born: 29 August 1952; Ål, Norway
- Died: 10 June 2018 (aged 65); Elverum, Norway
- Occupations: judge and civil servant

Nils Terje Dalseide (29 August 1952 – 10 June 2018) was a Norwegian judge and civil servant. He was born in Ål.

He served as State Conciliator of Norway from 2013 until his death in 2018.

Civic offices
Preceded by Kari Gjesteby	State Conciliator of Norway; 2013–2018	Succeeded by Mats Wilhelm Ruland
