= Lars T. Bjella =

Norwegian politician

Lars T. Bjella (8 May 1922 – 3 January 2013) was a Norwegian politician for the Centre Party.

He was active in Ål local politics for 25 years, among others serving as deputy mayor from 1968 to 1971. He served as a deputy representative to the Parliament of Norway from Buskerud during the terms 1950–1953, 1965–1969, 1969–1973 and 1973–1977. In total he met during 56 days of parliamentary session. He hailed from Torpo.

He worked as secretary in Buskerud Agrarian Association from 1947 to 1966. He became an honorary member here in 2001. Furthermore, he was elected chair of Ål Forest Owners Association in 1970. From 1975 he was also a board member of the regional branch of the association (now Viken Skog), serving for twelve years of which five years as chair. From 1984 to 1989 he chaired the Norwegian Forest Owners Association. He was proclaimed an honorary member here in 1991.

He was also a deputy board member of Direktoratet for vilt og ferskvannsfisk from 1980 to 1985 and board member of Landbrukets utbyggingsfond from 1985 to 1990. From 1985 to 1988 he chaired Skogtiltaksfondet. In the 1980s he was also a member of the Committee on Agrarian Policy, which delivered the Norwegian Official Report 1991: 2. He was also a member of the corporate council of Norske Skogindustrier, Tofte Industrier and Follum Fabrikker. He died in January 2013.
