= Valentin Voss =

Norwegian lawyer and civil servant

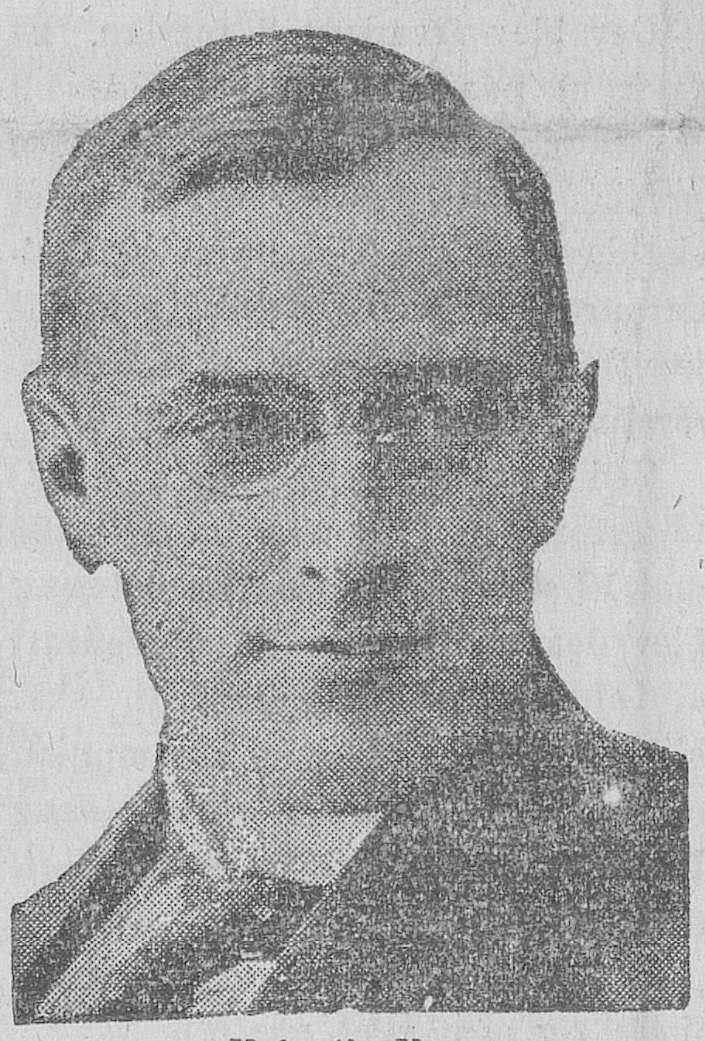
Valentin Voss

Valentin Voss (27 August 1880 – 23 June 1964) was a Norwegian lawyer and civil servant.

He took the cand.jur. degree in 1903 and the lawyer's license in 1909. From 1922 to 1930 he was the State Conciliator of Norway. From 1927 he was also a defender in Eidsivating Court of Appeal. From 1939 to 1941 he served as the Attorney General of Norway.

He was involved in the whaling industry as chairman of several companies. He was decorated as a Commander with Star of the Royal Norwegian Order of St. Olav. He died in June 1964 and was buried at Vestre gravlund.

He was a member of the Norwegian Association for Women's Rights.

Civic offices
Preceded by Paul Ivar Paulsen	State Conciliator of Norway; 1922–1930	Succeeded by Andreas Claussen
Preceded by Kristen Johanssen	Attorney General of Norway; 1939–1941	Succeeded by
