= Fossebreen =

Mountain in Norway

Coordinates: 60°46′44″N 8°25′16″E

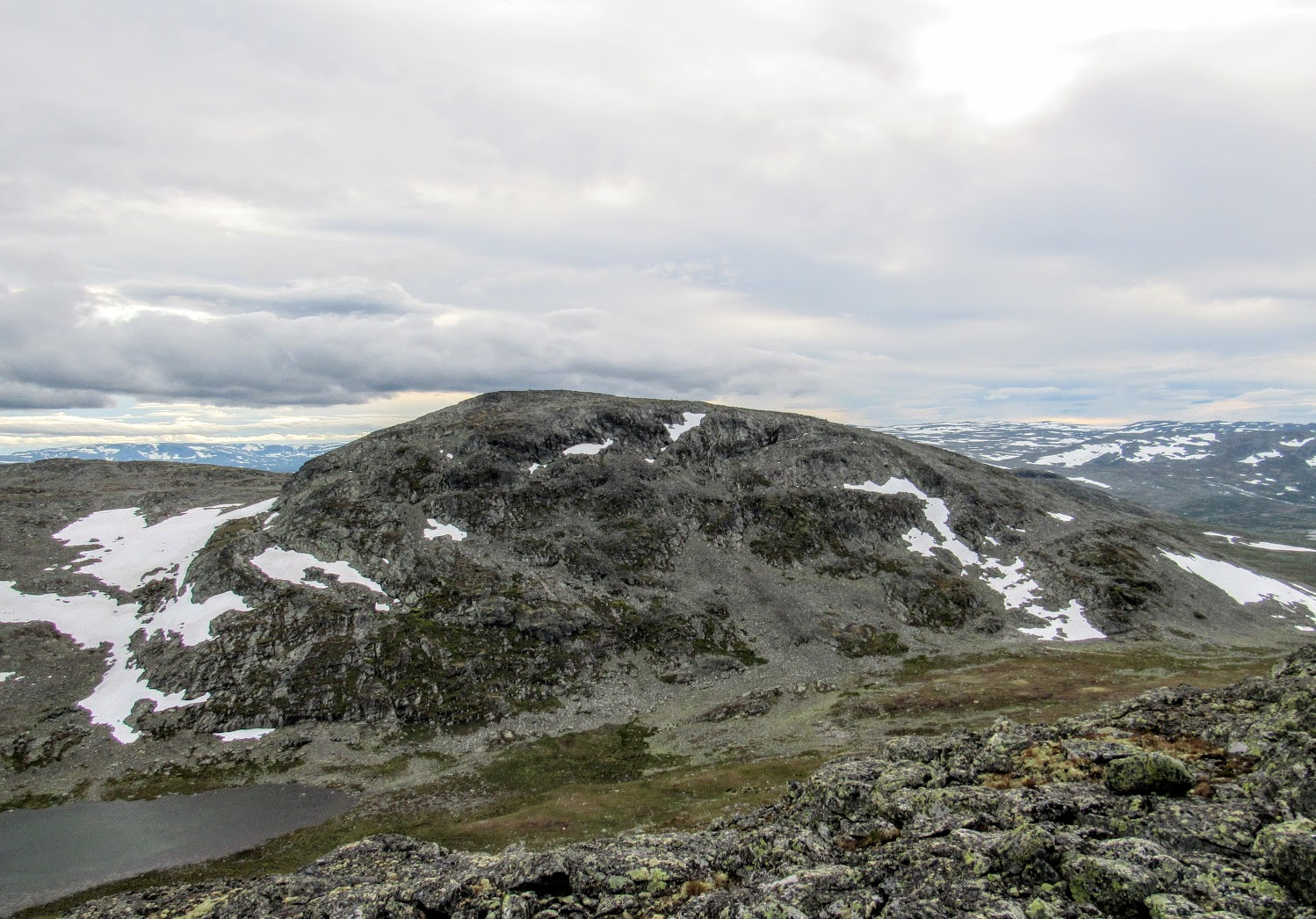

Highest point
- Elevation: 1,663 to 1,665 m (5,456 to 5,463 ft)

Geography
- Location: Buskerud, Norway

Fossebreen is a mountain in the municipality of Ål in Buskerud, Norway.
