= Ruthel Eksell =

Swedish graphic designer, drafter and fashion designer (1921–2022)

Ruthel Eksell (née Günzberger; 22 February 1921, in Breslau, Weimar Republic – 30 August 2022) was a Swedish graphic designer, drafter, fashion designer, interior designer and sculptor. Eskell was married to Olle Eksell, a graphic designer, poster artist and professor, with whom she had one daughter.
