= Reineskarvet =

Mountain in Norway

Highest point
- Elevation: 1,791 m (5,876 ft)
- Prominence: 435 m (1,427 ft)
- Isolation: 14.8 km (9.2 mi) to Raudebergnuten
- Coordinates: 60°46′42″N 8°9′57″E

Geography
- Location: Ål, Buskerud, Norway
- Topo map: 1516 I Gyrinosvatnet

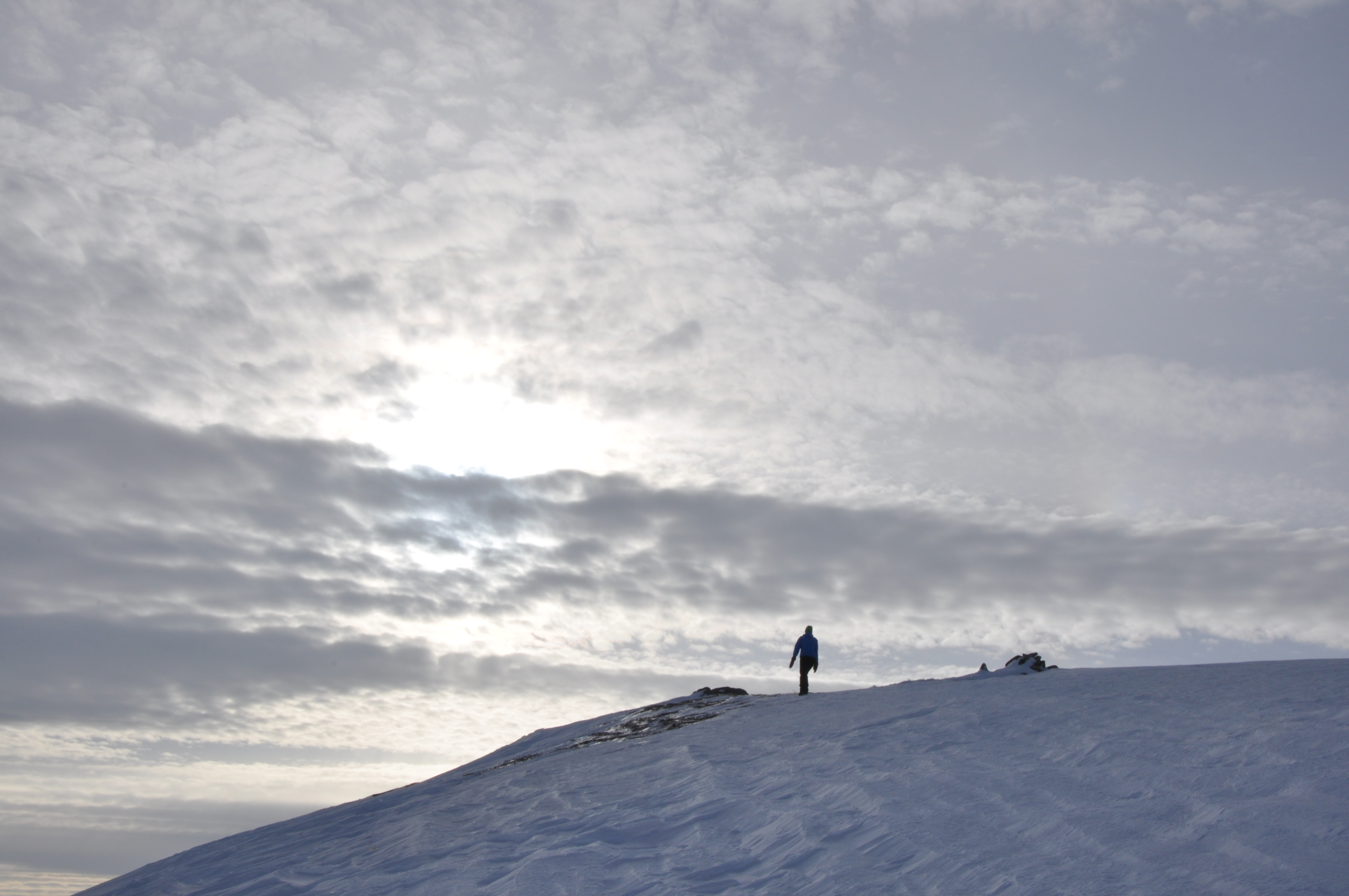
Reineskarvet

Reineskarvet is a significant mountain in the municipality of Ål in Buskerud, Norway.

It is located in the Skarvheimen highland area between Jotunheimen and Hardangervidda, on the north side of Hallingdalen, west of Hemsedal. Reineskarvet looks like Hallingskarvet and lies parallel to it a bit further northeast. The highest point lies in the western end, while there is a summit in the eastern end with elevation 1732 m, popular for hiking.

== Gallery ==
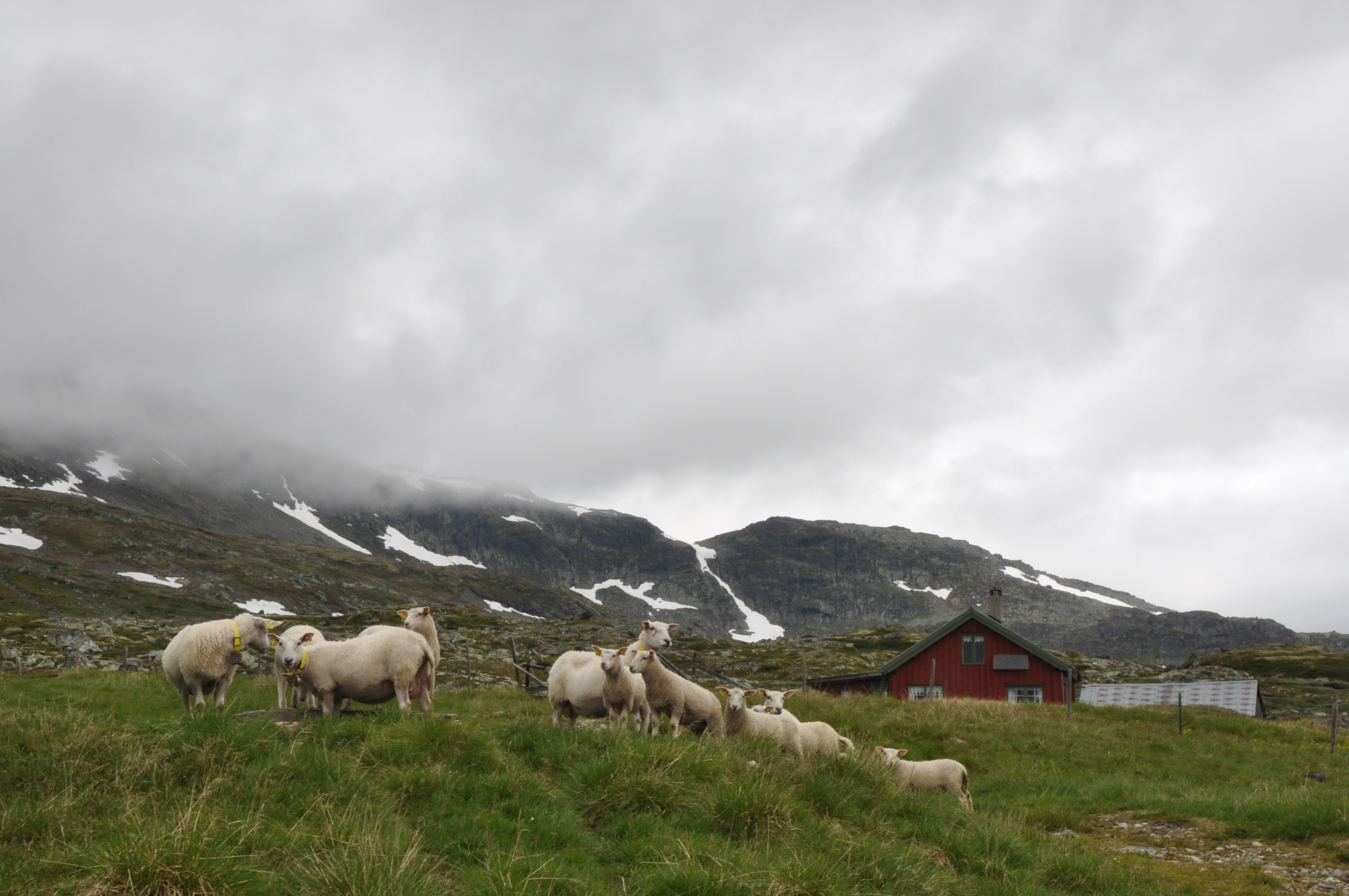

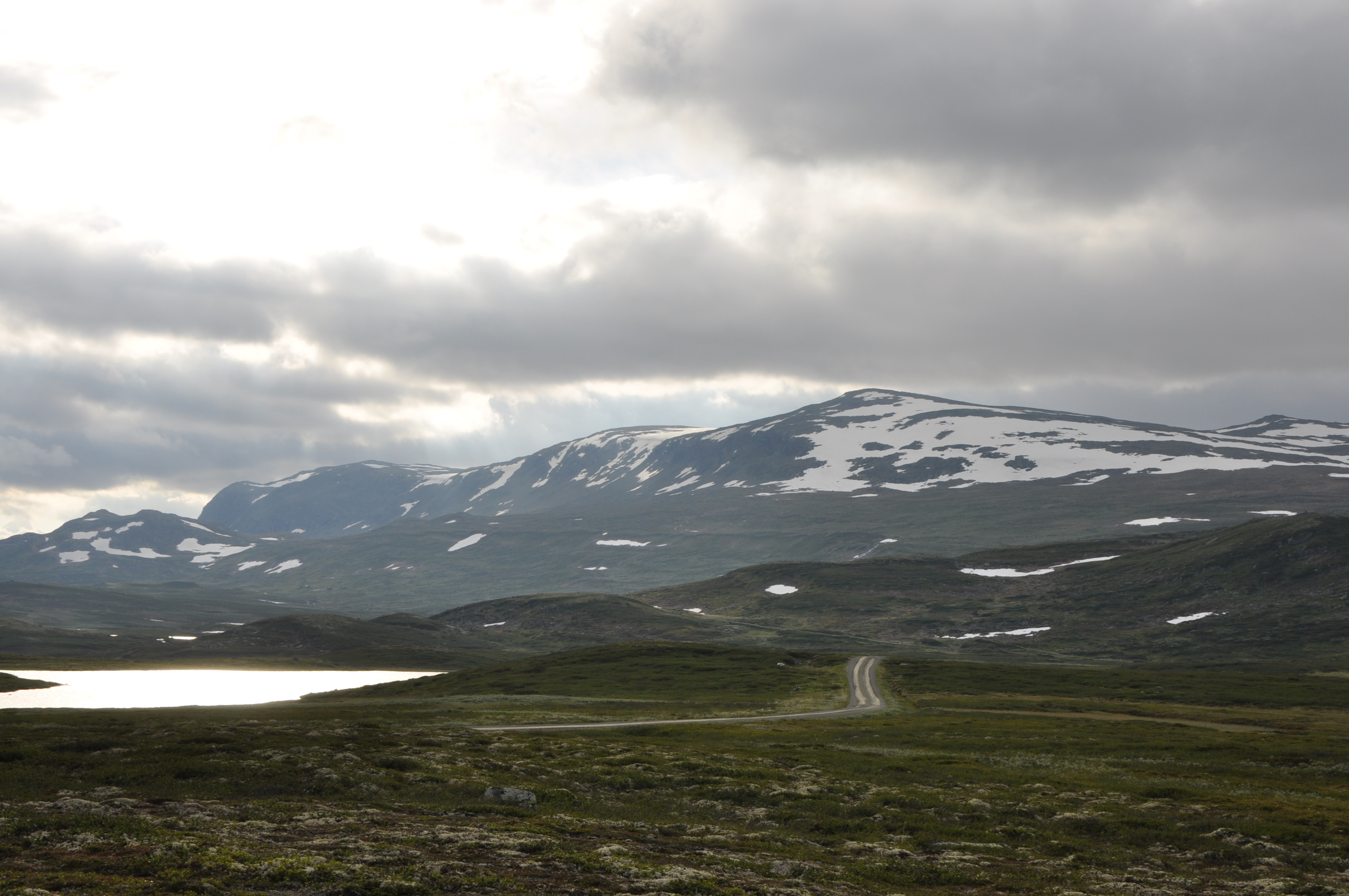

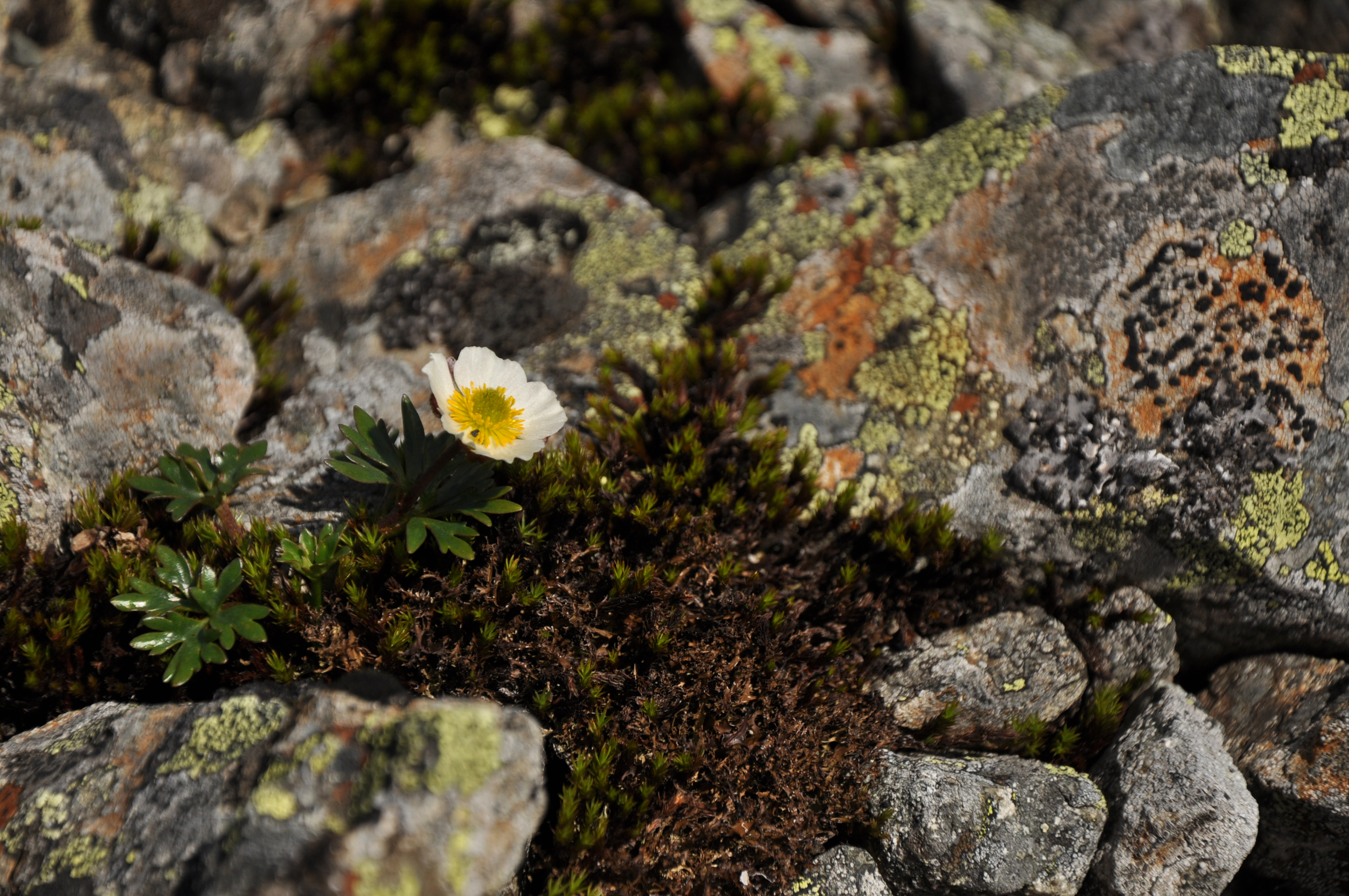

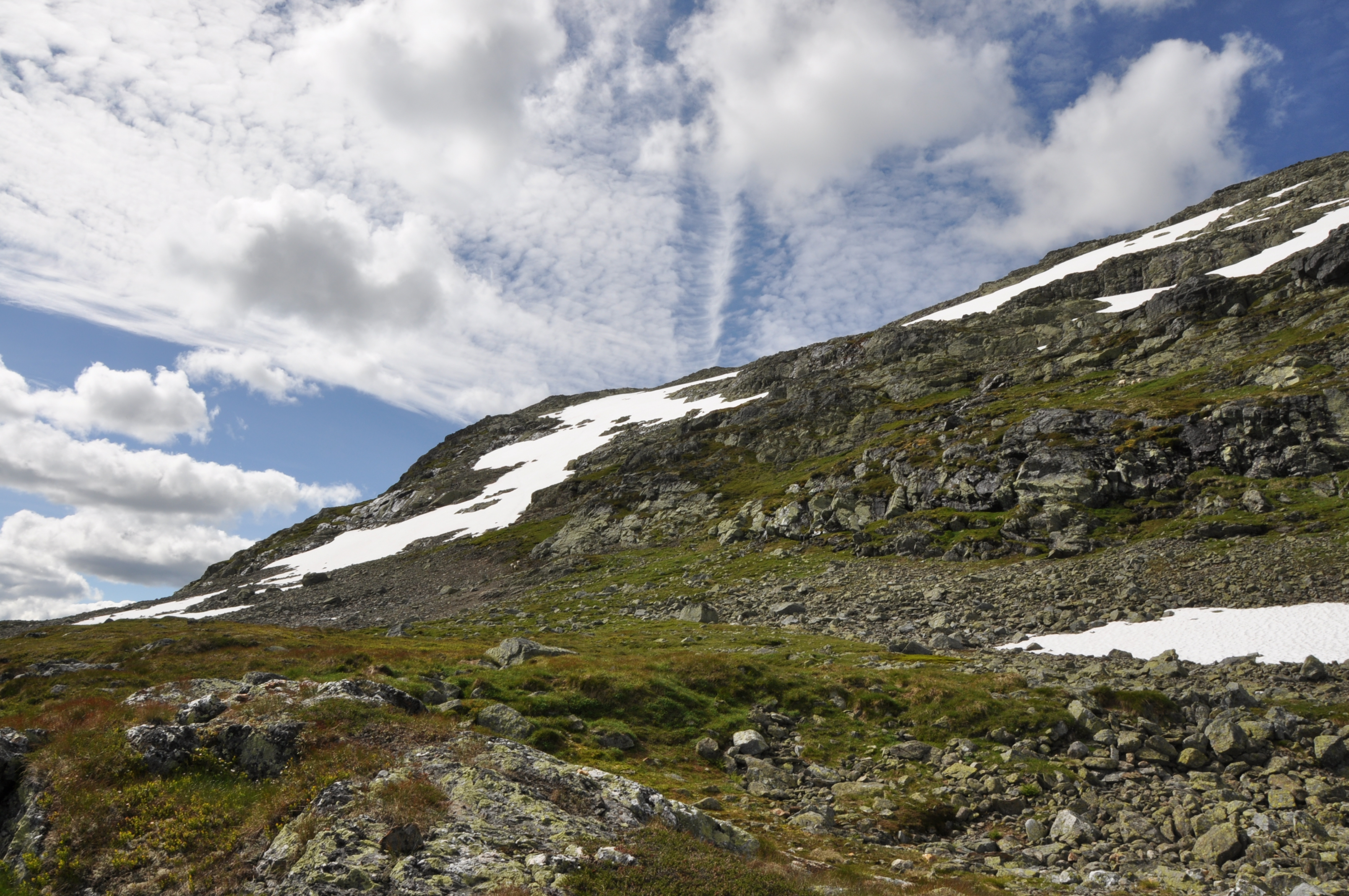
