= Reidar Webster =

Norwegian civil servant (1935–2022)

Reidar Ludvig Webster (11 January 1935 – 15 January 2022) was a Norwegian civil servant.

== Biography ==
He was born in Oslo as son of manager Reidar Ludvig Webster (1905–1966) and wife pianist Astrid Thyrnhi (1901–1981). He finished his secondary education in 1953, and graduated from the University of Oslo with the cand.jur. degree in 1963. In the same year he married district court judge Ingeborg Haldis Aslaksen. He was also a competitive sport canoeist, and has been president of the Norwegian Canoe Association.

In 1972 he was hired as assistant secretary in the Ministry of Local Government and Regional Development. In 1988 he was appointed State Conciliator of Norway, having been Assisting State Conciliator since 1978. His last day in office was on 31 December 2004. He was succeeded by Svein Longva. Webster died on 15 January 2022, at the age of 87.

Civic offices
Preceded by Bjørn Haug	State Conciliator of Norway; 1988–2004	Succeeded by Svein Longva
