= Einfrid Perstølen =

Norwegian psychiatrist and language proponent

- Born: 15 June 1917
- Died: 7 January 2017 (aged 99)
- Occupation: physician
- Known for: child psychiatry, Nynorsk

Einfrid Perstølen (15 June 1917 – 7 January 2017) was a Norwegian psychiatrist and language proponent.

== Life ==
She was born in Ål, and was a specialist in child psychiatry. She was an assisting chief physician in Oslo from 1961 to 1972, and then ran a private clinic. She made frequent appearances in Norwegian radio. She settled in Asker.

Perstølen was a proponent of the Nynorsk written form of Norwegian. She was a member of the board of Noregs Mållag from 1966 to 1971, and a member of the Norwegian Language Council from 1976 to 1984. She is known for pressuring the Bank of Norway to print Nynorsk tekst together with Bokmål on Norwegian krone bills, particularly through a series of letters to the Governor of the Bank of Norway, Knut Getz Wold. Perstølen died in January 2017 at the age of 99.
