= Jens Michael Lund =

Norwegian lawyer and civil servant (1872–1943)

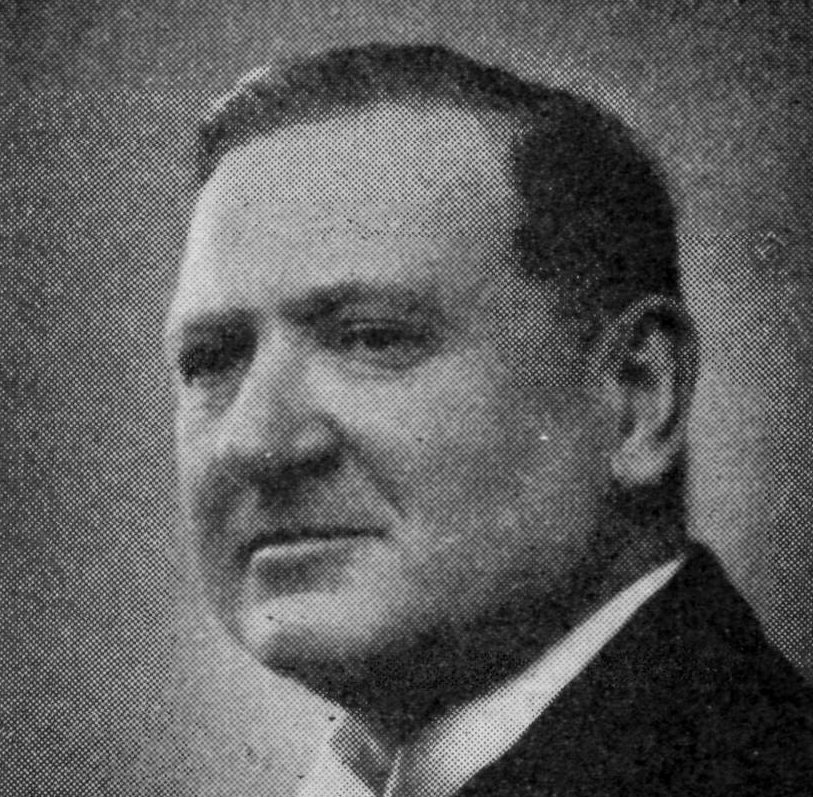
Jens Michael Lund

Jens Michael Lund (13 January 1872 – 10 March 1943) was a Norwegian lawyer and civil servant.

He was a brother of politician Fredrik Stang Lund, and a more distant relative of Jochum Brinch Lund, founding father Gabriel Lund, politician John Theodor Lund, historian Frederik Macody Lund and painters John Macody Lund and Henrik Lund.

He took the cand.jur. degree in 1897, and was from 1902 a barrister with access to working with Supreme Court cases. He was a public defender and prosecutor in the Supreme Court from 1923. From 1916 to 1920 he served as the first State Conciliator of Norway. He chaired the Labour Council from 1922.

Civic offices
Preceded by position created	State Conciliator of Norway; 1916–1920	Succeeded by Vilhelm Lie
Cultural offices
Preceded by Edvard Hagerup Bull	Chairman of Foreningen Norden in Norway; 1926–1939	Succeeded by Harald Grieg
