= Erik Kristen-Johanssen =

Norwegian jurist and theatre director

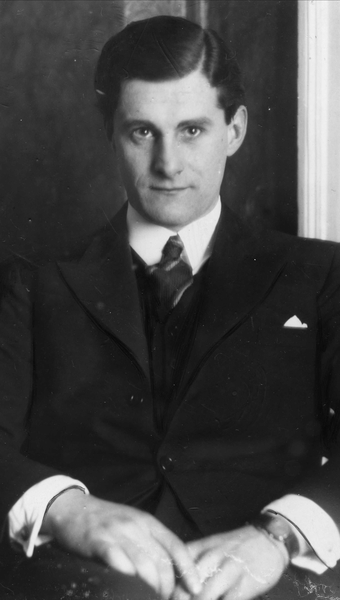
Erik Kristen-Johanssen, c. 1930

Erik Kristen-Johanssen (13 March 1901 – 30 January 1976) was a Norwegian jurist and theatre director.

He was born in Oslo as a son of Attorney General Kristen Johanssen. He took his law education abroad, and worked as a businessman until the Second World War, when he started working for the Ministry of Provisioning-in-exile in London. He later moved on to the Norwegian embassy in the United States.

He worked as financial director at Det Nye Teater from 1946 to 1948 and at the National Theatre from 1948 to 1961. He was the theatre director at the National Theatre from 1961 to 1968, and led the re-organisation of the institution from a private theatre to a theatre run by the state and Oslo municipality.

Cultural offices
Preceded by Carl Fredrik Engelstad	Director of the National Theatre; 1962–1967	Succeeded by Arild Brinchmann
