= Lysebottnuten =

Mountain in Norway

Coordinates: 60°51′45″N 8°10′35″E

Geography
- Location: Buskerud, Norway

Lysebottnuten is a mountain in the municipality of Ål in Buskerud, Norway. The climate around Lysebottnuten is a tundra. In 2000, there were around 3 people per square kilometer residing near Lysebottnuten.
