= Gunnar Alf Larsen =

Norwegian politician

Gunnar Alf Larsen (27 December 1919 – 24 December 2003) was a Norwegian Labour Party politician.

He was born in Oslo.

He was elected to the Norwegian Parliament from Oslo in 1965, and was re-elected on two occasions. He had previously served in the position of deputy representative from 1950 to 1965, during which time he met as a regular representative for Trygve Bratteli, Rakel Seweriin and Einar Gerhardsen who all at different times held positions in the Cabinet.

His career in politics ended with the posts of County Governor of Buskerud, which he held from 1962 to 1969, and County Governor of Akershus which he held from 1979 to 1988.

Civic offices
Preceded by Olaf Fredrik Watnebryn	County Governor of Buskerud; 1969–1979	Succeeded by Ragnar Christiansen
Preceded by Petter Mørch Koren	County Governor of Akershus; 1979–1988	Succeeded by Geir Engebretsen (acting)
