= Kristen Johanssen =

Norwegian attorney and jurist

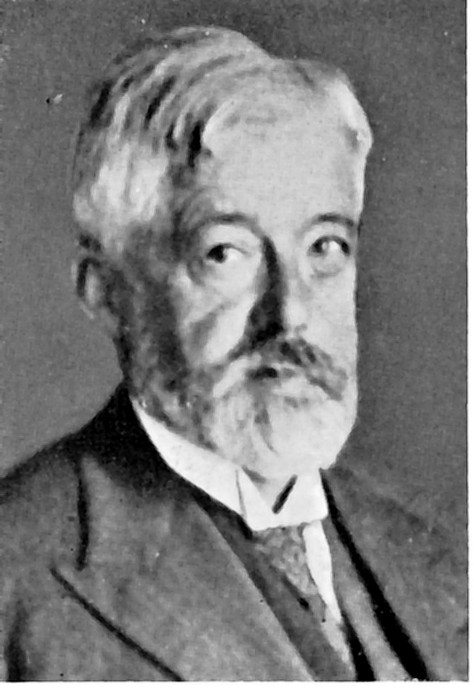
Kristen Johanssen

Kristen Johanssen (19 July 1869 – May 19, 1949) was a Norwegian attorney and jurist.

== Biography ==
He took the cand.jur. degree in 1892. After traveling abroad to Germany, France and England under a study scholarship, he settled in Kristiania (now Oslo) in 1896. After a period as assessor in Oslo City Court from 1897 to 1899 he took the lawyer's license. From 1924 to 1939 he served as the Attorney General of Norway.

He was a board member of Norske Liv from 1908 until 1941. He served on the board of Norsk Elektrisk & Brown Boveri from 1908, Det Norske Nitridaktieselskap from 1916, Andresens Bank and Foreningsbanken from 1928.

He was decorated as a Commander of the Order of St. Olav and the Order of the White Rose of Finland, and an Officier of the Legion of Honour. He died in 1949.

He was married Martha Goldschmidt (1878–1939). They were the parents of theatre director Erik Kristen-Johanssen (1901–1976). Their daughter Elisabeth Johanssen (1909–2002) was married to Dr. Ragnar Nicolaysen (1902–1986).

Cultural offices
Preceded by Annæus J. Schjødt	Attorney General of Norway; 1924–1939	Succeeded by Valentin Voss
