= Skoddenosi =

Mountain in Norway

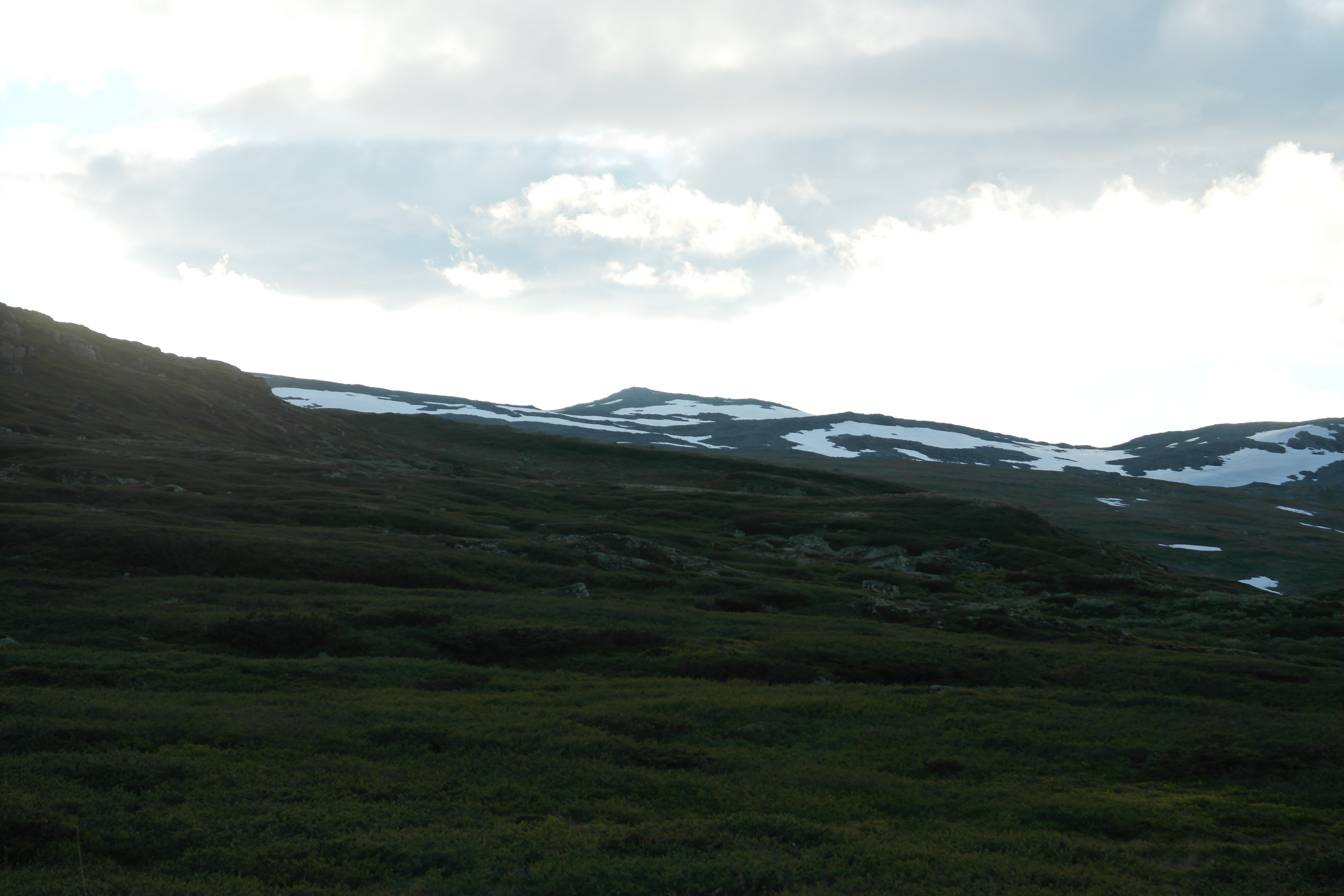
- Skoddenose as viewed from near Lauvdalen.

Highest point
- Elevation: 1,682 m (5,518 ft)
- Prominence: 42 m (138 ft)
- Coordinates: 60.767817°N 8.303888°E

Geography
- Location: Buskerud, Norway

Skoddenosi is a mountain of Ål municipality, Buskerud, in southern Norway.
