= Vigdis Moe Skarstein =

Norwegian librarian (born 1946)

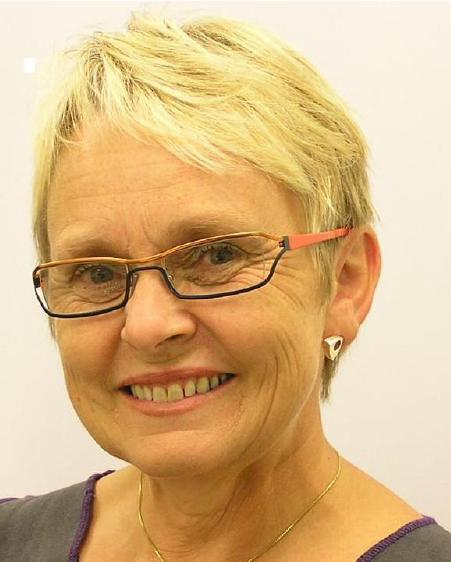
- Skarstein in 2006
- Born: 24 December 1946 (age 79); Levanger, Norway
- Occupation: librarian

Vigdis Moe Skarstein (born 24 December 1946) is a Norwegian librarian. She was born in Levanger.

She was appointed director of the Norwegian University of Science and Technology from 1998 to 2004. She served as director of the National Library of Norway from 2004 to 2014. From 2001 to 2009 she chaired the Arts Council Norway.

Civic offices
Preceded by	Director of the Norwegian University of Science and Technology; 1998–2004	Succeeded by
Preceded by Kari Gjesteby	Director of the National Library of Norway; 2004–2014	Succeeded by Aslak Sira Myhre
