= Paul Ivar Paulsen =

Norwegian lawyer and civil servant

Paul Ivar Paulsen (13 February 1868 – 12 October 1938) was a Norwegian lawyer and civil servant.

He took the cand.jur. degree in 1892. He was hired as an assistant secretary in the Norwegian Ministry of Justice and the Police in 1899 and was promoted to deputy under-secretary of state in 1908. In 1913, he became district stipendiary magistrate in Aker District Court, and in 1918 he became a Supreme Court Justice. From 1921 to 1922, he was the State Conciliator of Norway.

He also chaired Kristiania school board from 1911 to 1912, and worked with grading ("censoring") law exams at the University. He died in October 1938 and was buried at Vår Frelsers gravlund.

Civic offices
Preceded by Vilhelm Lie	State Conciliator of Norway; 1921–1922	Succeeded by Valentin Voss
