= Gråhyrnerene =

Mountain in Norway

Highest point
- Coordinates: 60°53′04″N 7°59′21″E

Geography
- Location: Buskerud, Norway

Gråhyrnerene (Gråhyrneran) is a mountain in the municipality of Ål in Buskerud, Norway.
