= Olle Eksell =

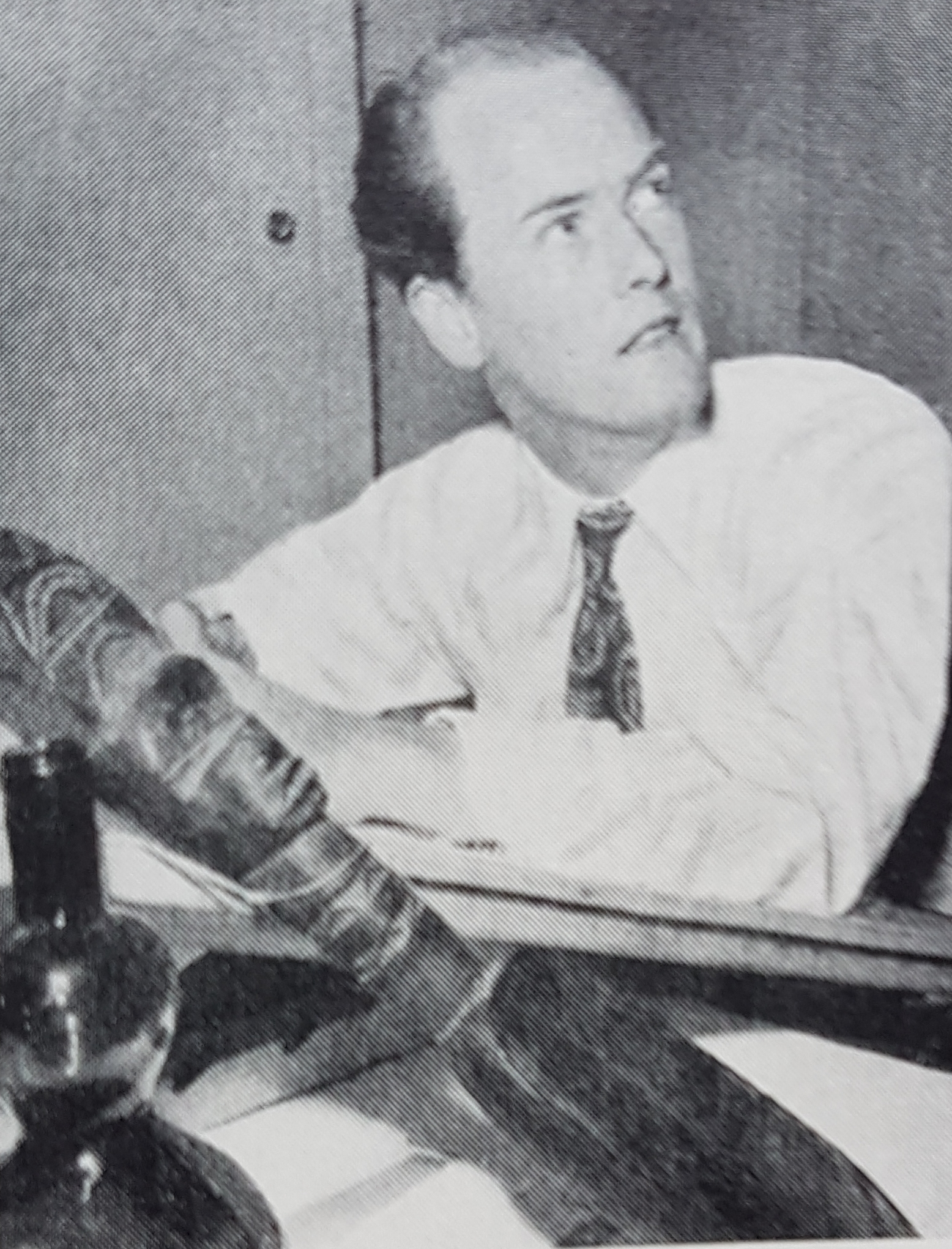
Eksell

Carl Olof Lennart "Olle" Eksell (March 22, 1918 – April 11, 2007) was a Swedish graphic designer and poster artist, and a professor until 2001. He gave shape to the classic Mazetti eyes, a motif he designed in the 1950s for Ögon Cacao, a Swedish chocolate brand. He was a member of the world jury of typography at the International Center for Graphic Arts in New York. He wrote the book Design = Economy where he advocated for integrating aesthetic principles with economic functionality.

== Personal life ==
Eksell was born in Ål, Sweden. Eksell was married to the graphic designer and drafter Ruthel Eksell, with whom he had one daughter.

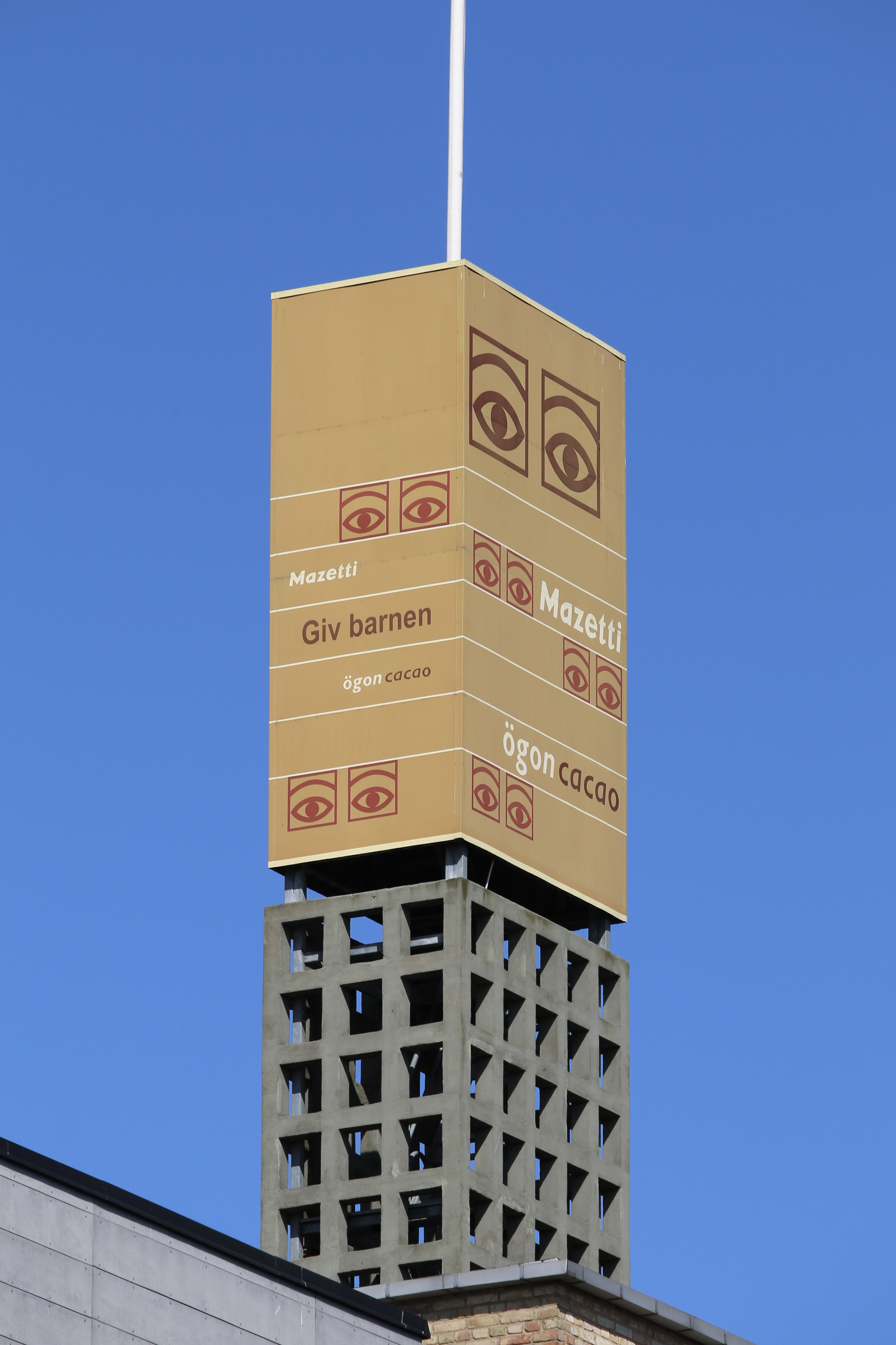
Eksell's iconic Eyes on the old Mazetti chocolate factory in Malmö
