= Kari Gjesteby =

Norwegian politician (born 1947)

Minister of Justice
- In office 3 November 1990 – 4 September 1992
- Prime Minister: Gro Harlem Brundtland
- Preceded by: Else Bugge Fougner
- Succeeded by: Grete Faremo

Minister of Trade and Shipping
- In office 4 February 1981 – 14 October 1981
- Prime Minister: Gro Harlem Brundtland
- Preceded by: Reiulf Steen
- Succeeded by: Arne Skauge

Personal details
- Born: 16 May 1947 (age 78) Oslo, Norway
- Party: Labour

Kari Gjesteby (born 16 May 1947) is a Norwegian politician for the Labour Party. She has never been a member of the Norwegian Parliament, but has been State Secretary for three tenures, as well as Minister of Trade and Shipping from February to October 1981 and Minister of Justice and the Police from 1990 to 1992. After her political career she has been a director in the Bank of Norway, director of the National Library of Norway and the Norwegian Library of Talking Books and Braille and, from 2009 to 2013, the first female State Conciliator of Norway.

== Career ==
=== Early career ===
She was born in Oslo as a daughter of politician Omar Gjesteby and Ingrid Elisabeth Thoresen. Odd Gjesteby (deceased) and Arne Gjesteby (deceased) are her brothers. She enrolled in primary school in Bjølsen in 1953, and finished secondary school at Oslo Commerce School in 1965. From 1967 to 1970 she studied economics at the Norwegian School of Economics and Business Administration. She also worked in Landsbanken from 1966 to 1967 and Universitetsforlaget from 1967 to 1972. She had become involved in the Workers' Youth League in her teens, chaired the secondary school branch from 1964 and was a secretary from 1966. She was a board member of the local Labour Party chapter from 1964 to 1966 and 1974 to 1975.

=== Political career ===
From 1972 she was a consulent in the Ministry of Local Government and Labour. She left in 1974 to become political secretary (today known as political advisor) in the Ministry of Government Administration and Consumer Affairs. In January 1976 she was promoted to State Secretary in the Ministry of Church and Education. She left in January 1978, but returned in October 1979 as State Secretary in the Ministry of Finance. On 4 February 1981 she was promoted to Minister of Trade and Shipping in the so-called "female government" of Gro Harlem Brundtland. This cabinet only lasted until October 1981. From 1981 to 1982 she was a secretary for the parliamentary group and the now-minority leader Gro Harlem Brundtland. When the second cabinet Brundtland assumed office in May 1986, Gjesteby was State Secretary in the Ministry of Foreign Affairs. She left in May 1988. In the first two years of the third cabinet Brundtland, from November 1990 to September 1992, Gjesteby was Minister of Justice and the Police.

=== Later career ===
In between her spells as a full-time politician, she worked for the Nordic Council of Ministers from 1978 to 1979 and 1983 to 1986. In 1990, she was hired as director in the Bank of Norway. She was given absence of leave to be director of the National Library of Norway from 2002 to 2004 and the Norwegian Library of Talking Books and Braille from 2005 to 2006. In 2009, she was appointed the State Conciliator of Norway, as the first woman to hold the position.

She was a board member of the Bank of Norway (1983–1989) and the Nordic Investment Bank (1988–1990, 1992–1996), the last four years as deputy chair. She was a board member of Oslo arbeidersamfunn (1973–1975, 1983–1984), Horten Verft (1974–1983, 1974–1983), Elcon Leasing (1978–1979), Statens driftssentral for administrative databehandling (1978–1979), Oslo Lysverker (1988–1990), Norsk Hydro (1990) SAS Norway (1997–2001), Mint of Norway (2001–2003), HAV Eiendom (2003–present), Statskonsult (2003–present), Norwegian Academy of Music, Veidekke (2004–present), White Buses Foundation (2007–present). She was the deputy chair of the Guarantee Institute for Export Credits (1993–1995), and chaired the board of directors of the Cancer Registry of Norway (1988–1990), Kommunenes filmsentral (1994–1995), Asplan Viak (1997–2006), Kings Bay (2000–2002), Bjørnøen (2000–2002), and the National Institute for Consumer Research. Of the Nordic Arts Centre in Suomenlinna she was chair (1978–1982) and board member (1982–1983). In Dyno Industrier she was a board member (1985–1995) and chair (1996–2000). Of Oslo Bolig- og Sparelag (OBOS) she was a board member (1985–1987), deputy chair (1987–1990) and chair (1990), and of OBOS Forretningsbygg she was a board member (1988–1990) and chair (1990). From 1985 to 1990 she was a board member of Norwegian Federation of Co-operative Housing Associations.

She lives in Enerhaugen.

Political offices
Preceded by Reiulf Steen	Norwegian Minister of Trade and Shipping; February 1981–October 1981	Succeeded by Arne Skauge
Preceded by Else Bugge Fougner	Norwegian Minister of Justice and the Police; 1990–1992	Succeeded by Grete Faremo
Civic offices
Preceded by Bendik Rugaas	Director of the National Library of Norway; 2002–2004	Succeeded by Vigdis Moe Skarstein
Preceded by	Director of the Norwegian Library of Talking Books and Braille; 2005–2006	Succeeded by Øyvind Engh
Preceded by Geir Engebretsen (acting)	State Conciliator of Norway; 2009–2013	Succeeded by Nils Terje Dalseide
