= Norwegian University of Life Sciences =

University in Ås, Norway

- Norges miljø- og biovitenskapelige universitet
- Motto: Knowledge for life
- Type: Public university
- Established: 1859; 167 years ago
- Rector: Solve Sæbø
- Administrative staff: 2000
- Students: 7700
- Location: Ås, Norway; 59°39′54.39″N 10°45′54.82″E
- Colors
- Website: nmbu.no

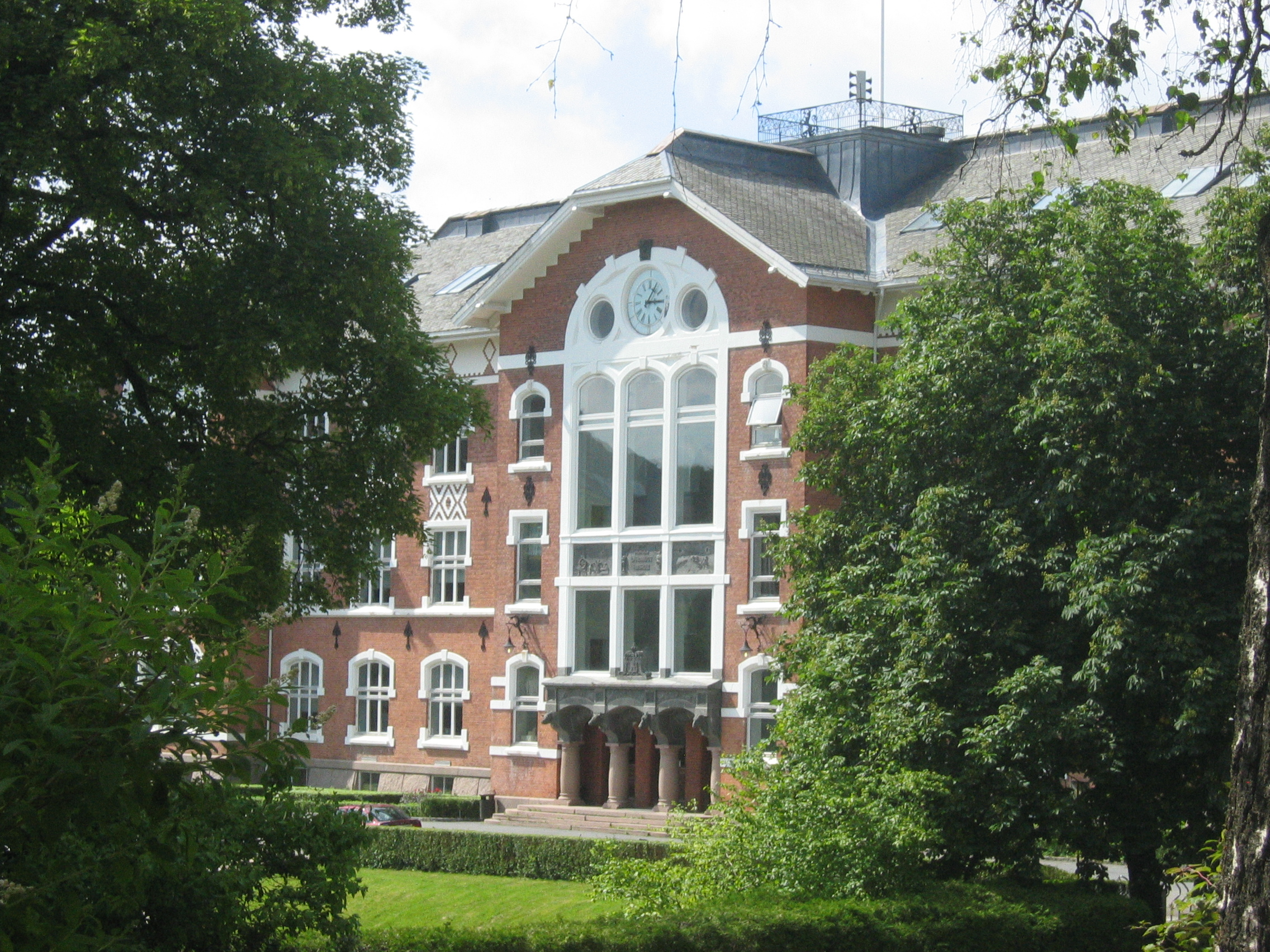
Norwegian University of Life Sciences main building

The Norwegian University of Life Sciences (Norwegian: Norges miljø- og biovitenskapelige universitet, NMBU) is a public university located in Ås, Norway. It is located in Akershus county and has around 7,700 students. The university is organized into seven faculties and is the only educational institution in Norway to provide veterinary education.

== History ==
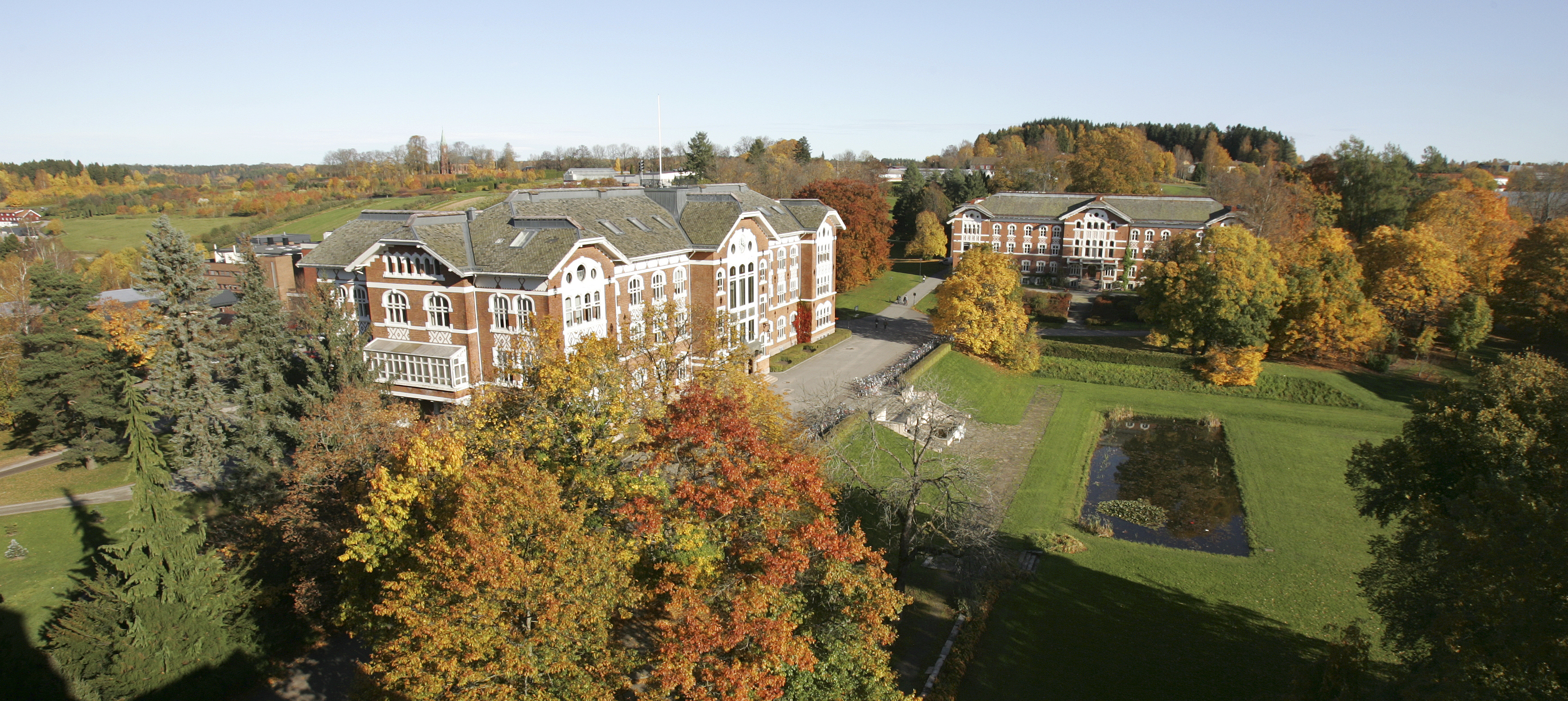
NMBU campus

The institution was established in 1859 as the Higher Agricultural College (Den høiere Landbrugsskole). In 1897 the institution was transformed into the Norwegian College of Agriculture (Norges Landbrugshøiskole, later spelled Norges Landbrukshøiskole, Norges landbrukshøyskole and Norges landbrukshøgskole, abbreviated NLH). It received the status of a university-level college (vitenskapelig høgskole). In 2005 it received university status and was renamed the Norwegian University of Life Sciences (Universitetet for miljø- og biovitenskap; UMB). In 2014 the university merged with the Norwegian School of Veterinary Science (NVH) in Oslo; it retained its English name but was formally renamed Norges miljø- og biovitenskapelige universitet (NMBU) in Norwegian. It is the only educational institution in Norway to provide veterinary education.

== Organization ==
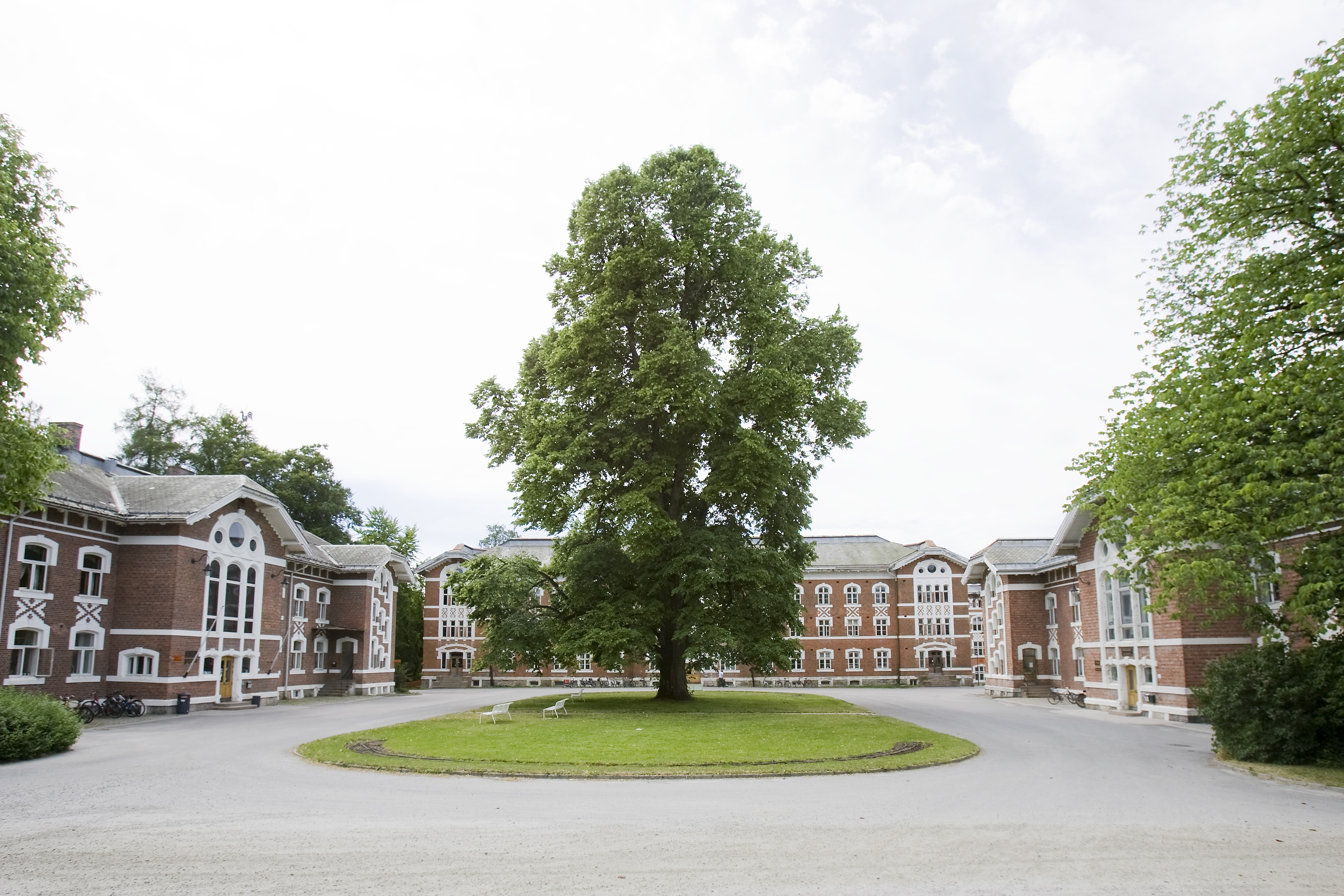
NMBU Courtyard, Ås

The university is organized into seven faculties:

- Biosciences
- Chemistry, Biotechnology and Food Science
- Environmental Sciences and Natural Resource Management
- Landscape and Society
- School of Economics and Business
- Science and Technology
- Veterinary Medicine

It also includes eight centers:

- Aquaculture Protein Center (APC)
- Animal Production Experimental Centre (SHF)
- Centre for Plant Research in Controlled Climate (SKP)
- Centre for Continuing Education (SEVU)
- The Centre for Integrative Genetics (Cigene)
- Centre for Landscape Democracy (CLaD)
- Norwegian Centre for Bioenergy Research
- Imaging Centre Campus Ås

=== Degree programmes ===
Bachelor's degree programmes in English

- International Environment and Development Studies

Master's degree programmes in English

- Agroecology
- Animal Breeding and Genetics
- Aquatic Food production - Safety and Quality
- Aquaculture
- Data Science
- Development and Natural Resource Economics
- Ecology
- Feed Manufacturing Technology
- International Development Studies
- International Environmental Studies
- International Relations
- Radioecology

Bachelor's degree programmes in Norwegian

- Animal Science
- Biotechnology

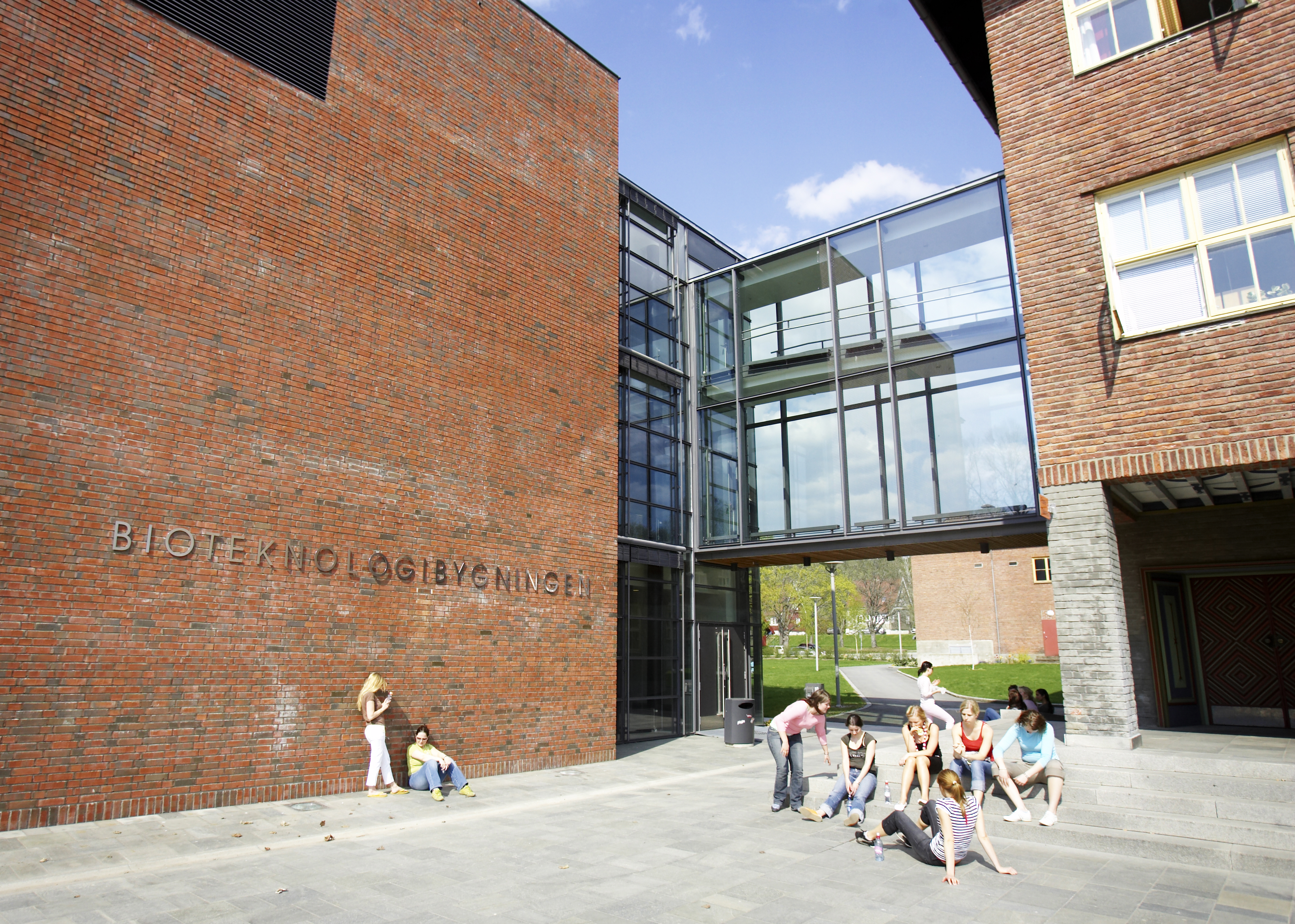
NMBU Biotechnology Building

- Business Administration
- Chemistry
- Ecology
- Economics
- Environment and Natural Resources
- Food Science
- Forest, Environment and Industry
- Geomatics
- Landscape Construction and Management
- Natural Science
- Plant Science
- Renewable Energy

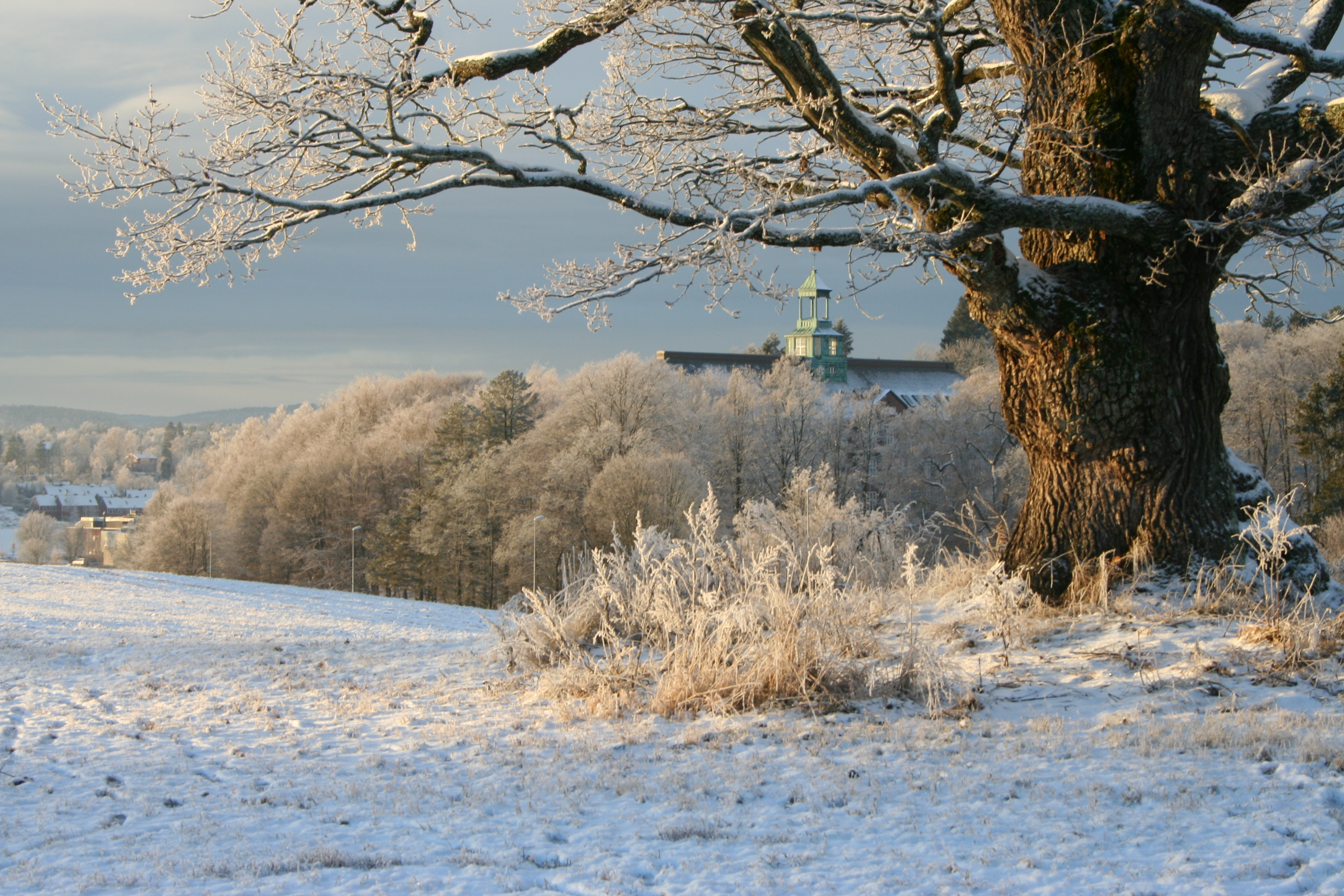
Ås in winter

Master's degree programmes in Norwegian - 5 years

- Chemistry and Biotechnology
- Environmental Physics and Renewable Energy
- Geomatics
- Industrial Economics
- Landscape Architecture
- Mechanical engineering
- Property and Land Law
- Robotics
- Spatial Planning
- Structural Engineering and Architecture
- Urban and Regional Planning
- Teacher Education in Natural Sciences
- Water and Environmental Technology

Master's degree programmes in Norwegian - 2 years

- Animal Science
- Bioinformatics and Applied Statistics
- Biology
- Biotechnology
- Business Administration
- Chemistry
- Environment and Natural Resources
- Food Science
- Forest Sciences
- Innovation and Entrepreneurship
- Management of Natural Resources
- Mathematical, Physical and Computational Sciences
- Microbiology
- Nature-based Development and Innovation
- Packaging
- Plant Science
- Public Health
- Real Estate Development
- Renewable Energy

PhD studies Doctoral programmes are based on a continuation in the Norwegian degree system from a master's degree or an equivalent qualification. A doctoral programme consists of course work, (an) individual research project(s) and a dissertation, which is defended in a formal oral examination.

Other programmes in Norwegian

- One-year Teacher Education programme - part-time
- One-year Teacher Education programme - full-time
- Science

Domestic and EU-based students do not have to pay tuition.

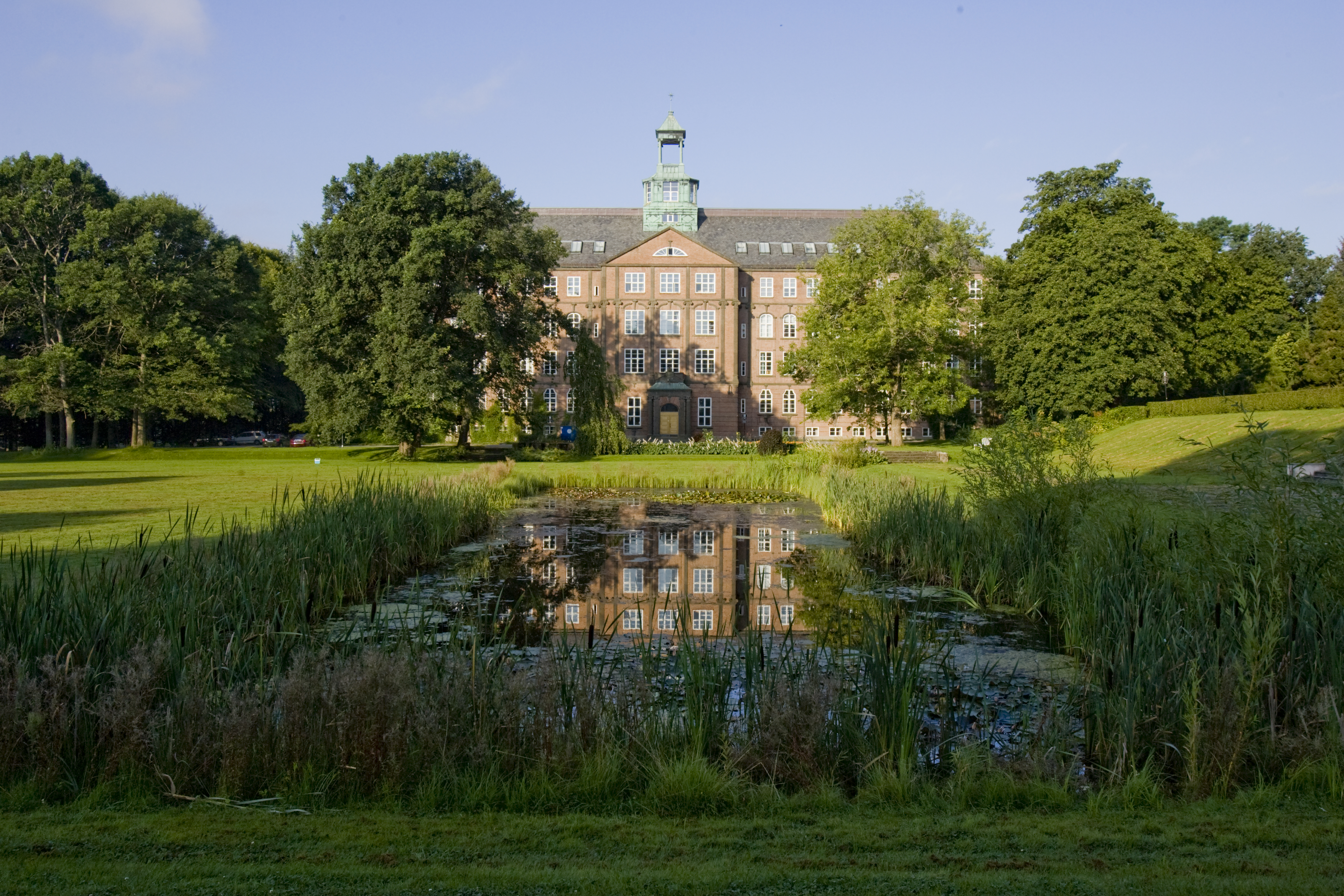
Tower Building

== International students ==
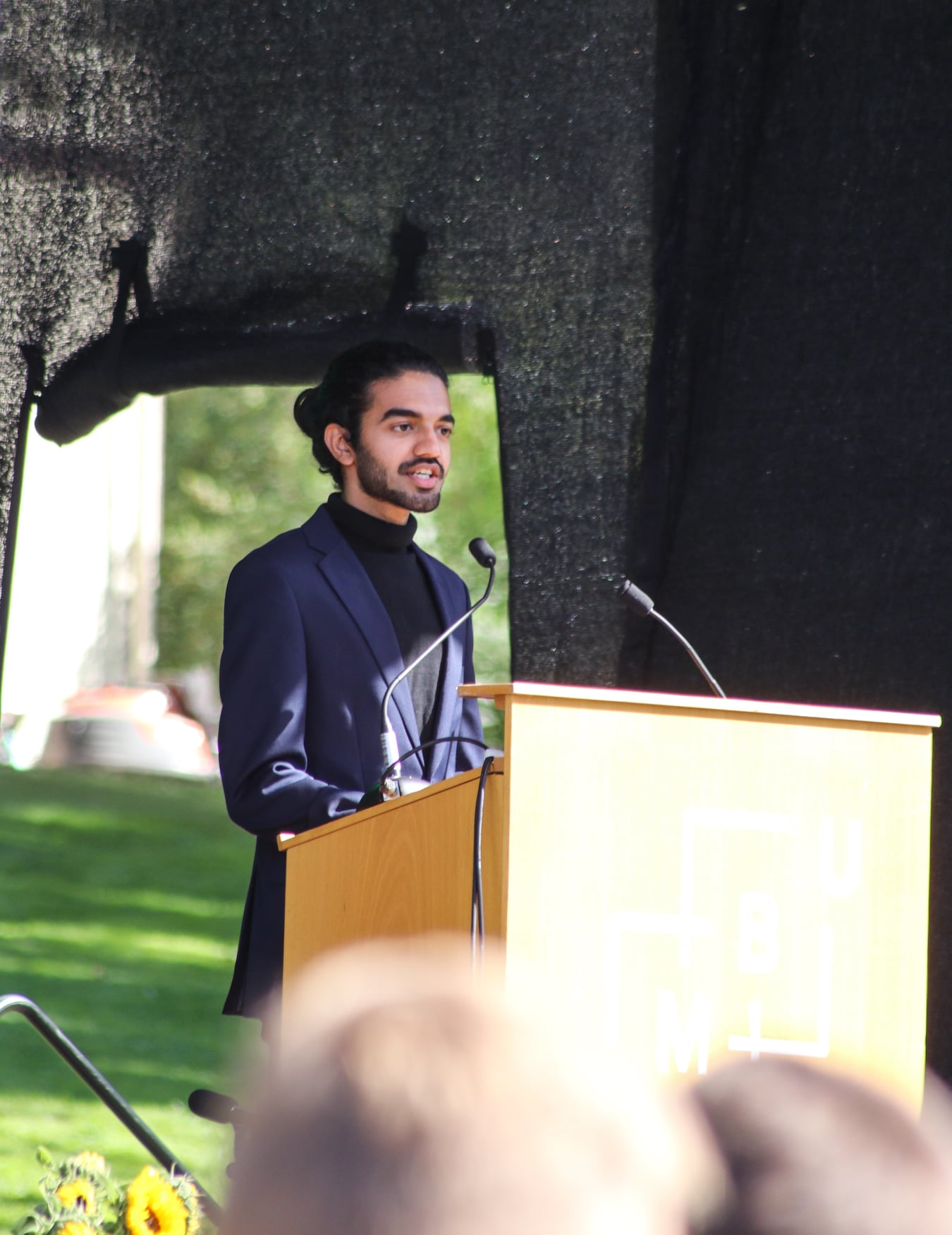
An International student from India giving speech during the Matriculation ceremony of NMBU, 2021 (Immatrikulering 2021)

NMBU has exchange agreements with more than 93 universities worldwide, including six Nordic, 44 European and eight North American institutions. Institutional partnerships with universities in developing countries are carried out mainly through the Department of International Environmental and Development Studies/Noragric. The objectives of NMBU’s cooperation with universities abroad include building strong academic networks, facilitating international exchange and contributing to the competence building with universities in the south.

== Research and rankings ==
University rankings

Global – Overall
- ARWU World: 701–800 (2024)
- QS World: 791-800 (2024)
- THE World: 601–800 (2024)
- USNWR Global: =736 (2023)

Research at NMBU includes basic research and applied research, providing a foundation for education, research training and research geared towards the private sector. Research is mainly focused on Environmental Sciences, Veterinary medicine, Food Science, Biotechnology, Aquaculture and Business Development. It also has a strong interdisciplinary and international approach. There is a strong link between research and the NMBU study programs; students at the Master and PhD level are often involved in many research activities. Research is also a joint venture between research institutes in Ås. Together, the university and the institutions represent the largest research environments for life sciences in Norway. NMBU is also active through national alliances with other institutions and through institutional partnerships with universities in developing countries. NMBU’s health-related research is linked to healthy food, clean water and the environment and the many related challenges in developing countries.

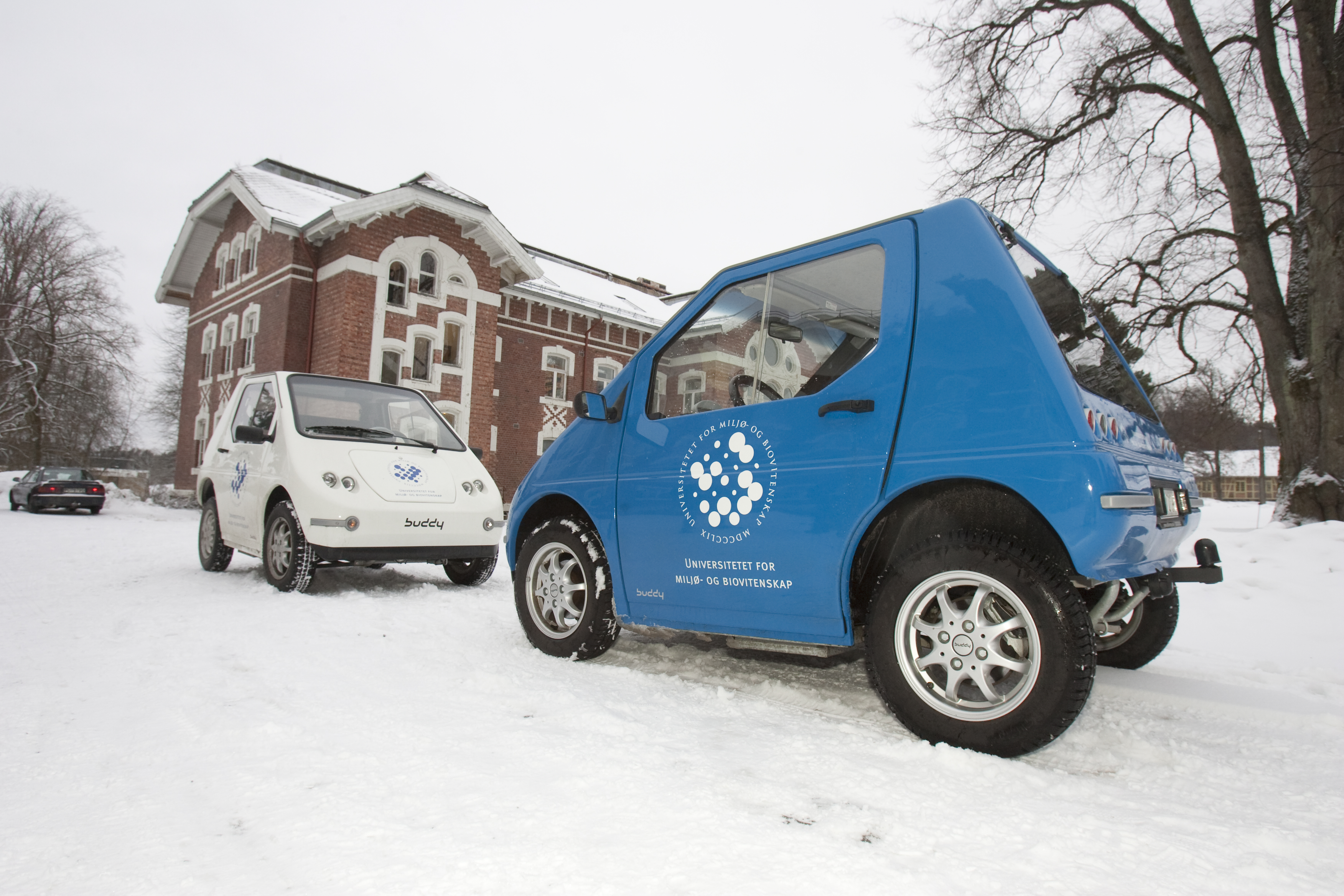
NMBU Electric Cars

== Student life ==
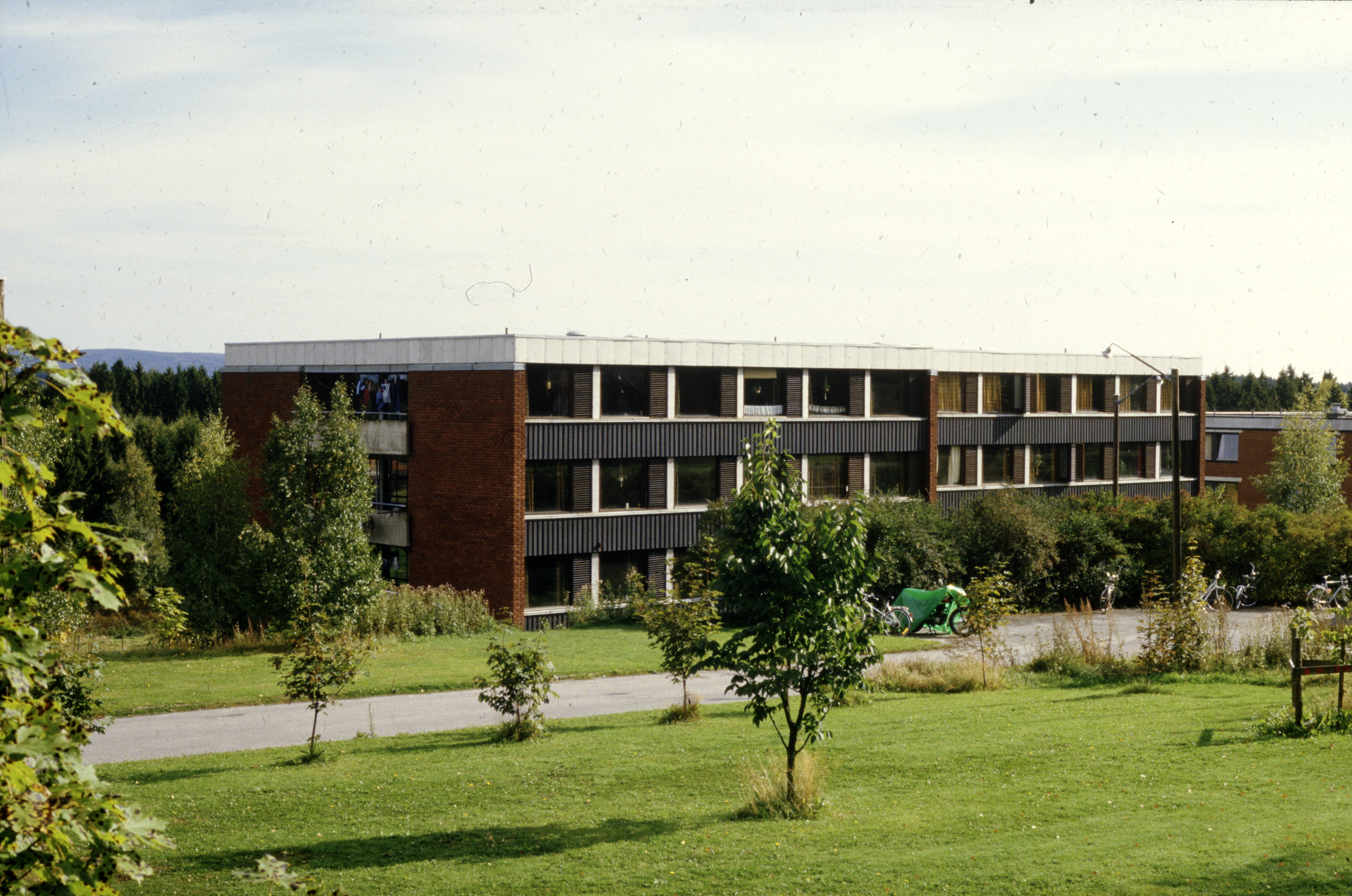
Pentagon

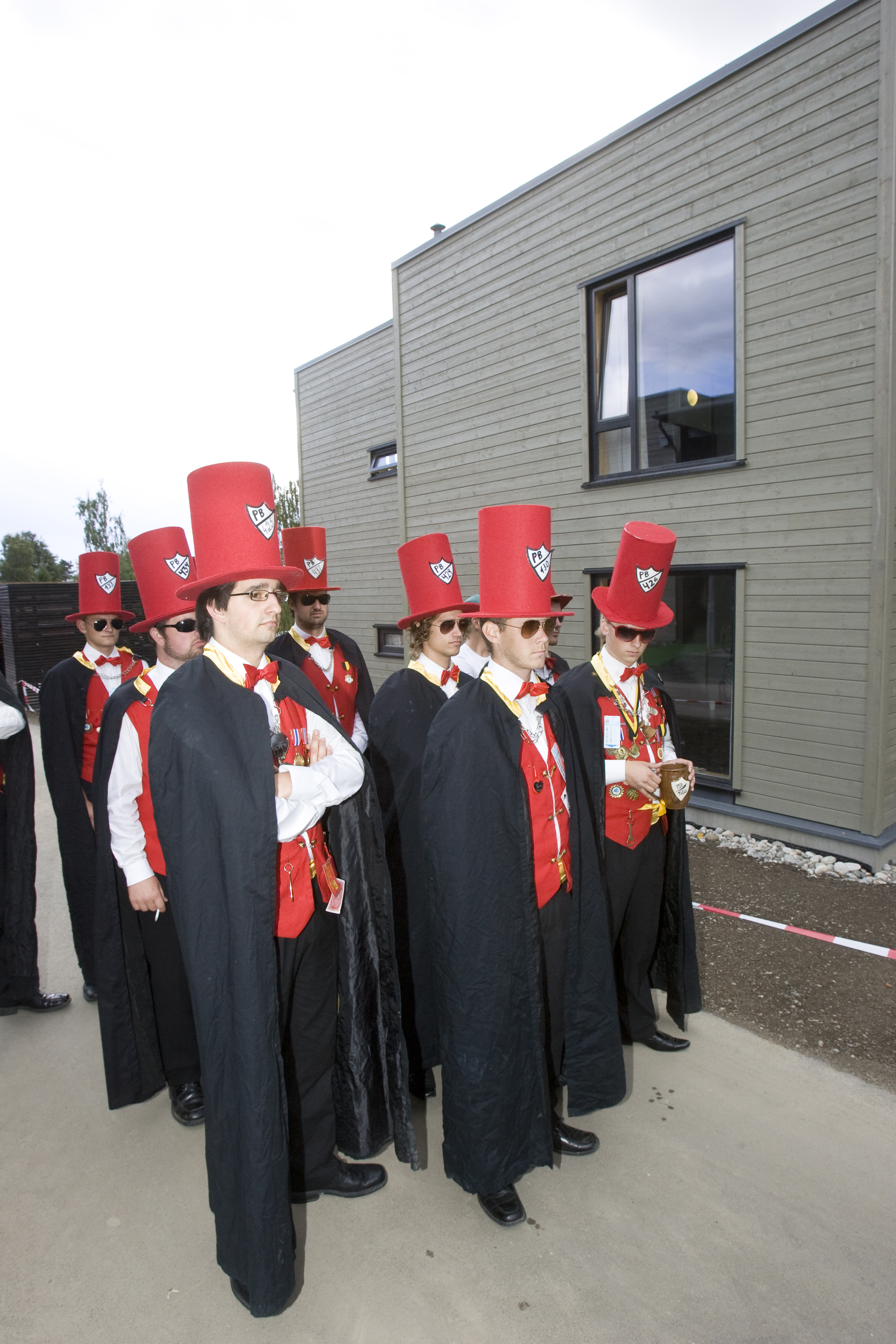
NMBU student life

=== Student Housing ===
The Pentagon, a group of buildings south of the NMBU campus, houses students. Other students live in private housing.

=== Organizations ===
University Foundation for Student Life in Ås (SiÅs) The University Foundation for Student Life in Ås was established in 1955 under and in pursuance of the Act of 28.06.96 of Student unions. SiÅs shall:

- provide the students with good and reasonable welfare offers
- promote the students’ interests
- contribute do that NMBU becomes and attractive place to study and work

SiÅs is in charge of the student accommodations, sports center, bookstore, print shop, restaurant and cafeterias, nursery, kiosk and booking of meeting and function rooms.

Studentsamfunnet in Ås is part of the student community at the Norwegian University of Life Sciences (NMBU), which includes numerous clubs and societies offering social, cultural, and recreational activities. Studentsamfunnet in Ås is one of the university’s oldest student organizations and manages several buildings used for student events and community activities.

The Student Board The Student Board (NSO Ås) deals with everything that concerns student democracy, including daily contact with SiÅs and contact with the different student representatives in various boards, assemblies and committees. The Student Board is the administrative head of the Student Parliament, but it is the Student Parliament that controls the Student Board. The Student Committee consists of elected representatives from each department plus elected members of the Student Board. The highest body in the student democracy is the general assembly (Allmøtet). Here, all students have speaking and voting rights. Representatives to the Student Board are elected at the general assembly, which is held every autumn and spring. at the department general assemblies, student representatives on department level are elected. All students have speaking and voting rights on their department’s general assemblies.

International Student Union The International Student Union (ISU) is an organization composed of international students that attend various universities and Høgskolen throughout Norway and who have particular interest in student politics and international student rights. ISU is a democratic, non-profit, non-religious, multicultural and non-partisan organization that seeks to serve and promote the interests of foreign students who are studying in Norway. ISU represents the voice of international students in political and academic matters and has to main aims:

- to ensure that the rights and interests of all international students are suitably represented and protected
- to maintain social welfare

ISU also promotes the relationship between Norwegian and international students and works to sustain the connections with local student organizations. Membership with ISU is free and open to all international students in Norway. Elections are held once a year in September and all international students have the right o run for office and vote. The members of the board meet in the student post office approximately every two weeks after classes and work as a team to discuss many different aspects of the international student life. ISU is a democracy and each member has the right to propose, suggest and advise. The highest branch of the ISU is the National Assembly that carries out the working plans and approves budgets for all of the ISU branches. Local branches have the autonomy to decide the conditions for their own activities.

Newspapers Tuntreet

Athletics GG-Hallen, the university’s sports hall, offers recreational sports clubs.

== Alumni ==
- Eivind Dale (1979)
- Adelaida K. Semesi

== See also ==
- Biology
- Glossary of biology
