= Sperati =

Sperati is an Italian surname. Notable people with the surname include:

- Carlo Alberto Sperati (1860–1945), Norwegian-American composer and music professor
- Jean de Sperati (1884–1957), Italian stamp forger
- Lulli Sperati (1873–1946), Norwegian actress and singer
- Octavia Sperati (actress) (1847–1918), Norwegian actress
- Paolo Sperati (1821–1884), Italian-Norwegian conductor, musician and composer
- Robert Sperati (1872–1945), Norwegian actor
- Sara Sperati (born 1956), Italian film actress

== See also ==
- Octavia Sperati, a Norwegian gothic metal band
