= Stinnes =

Stinnes is a surname. Notable people with the surname include:

- Clärenore Stinnes (1901–1990), German racing driver
- Edmund Stinnes (1896–1980), German-born American industrialist, professor and heir
- Hugo Stinnes (1870–1924), German entrepreneur and politician, father of Clärenore
- Matiás Stinnes (1910–1975), Argentine luger
