= Thurid Hetland =

Norwegian actress, singer, and preacher (1885–1963)

- Born: July 8, 1885; Stavanger, Norway
- Died: January 18, 1963 (aged 77); Filtvet, Norway
- Occupations: Actress, singer, and preacher

Thurid Marie Hetland (first name also Turid; July 8, 1885 – January 18, 1963) was a Norwegian actress, singer, and preacher. She was an actress both on stage and in film, performed as a pianist, and also made a gramophone recording.

== Family ==
Thurid Hetland was born in Stavanger, the daughter of the sales agent Alexander Olai Hetland (1851–1912) and the midwife Berthe Christine Pedersen (1851–?). She was the sister of the actress Cesie Hetland (1874–?). She married the Norwegian-American painter Erik P. Petri (1878–1966) in 1918.

== Life and work ==
Thurid Hetland was an actress at the National Theater in Bergen from 1907 to 1909, where she first performed as a theater student. In 1910 she made appearances as a singer of romantic songs. In 1911, Hetland went on tour, including with the actor Birger Bruhn. Starting in September of the same year, she participated in the National Tour's fifth season under Ludovica Levy's management. Around 1914 she was associated with Chat Noir in Kristiania (now Oslo). In 1914, she took part in the Central Theater's Central Tour, led by Pehr Qværnstrøm, in which, among other things, she performed shows from Chat Noir and took part in several plays.

Thurid Hetland was also a film actress for a short period. In 1917, she appeared in the role of the miser Per Grunk's sister in the silent film En vinternat, which is considered lost. In the same year, she also appeared in the film De Forældreløse.

After ending her acting career, Hetland became a preacher associated with The Salvation Army's Home League (Norwegian: Hjemforbundet). For a period she was the organization's secretary.

== Selected theater roles ==
- The postmistress in Den røde Hane by Palle Rosenkrantz (Central Tour, 1910)
- Emma in Hans Huckebein (Norwegian title: Damen fra Ostende) by Oscar Blumenthal and Gustav Kadelburg (1911)
- The Duchess of Berwick (Norwegian: Hertugunnen av Berwick) in Lady Windermere's Fan (Norwegian title: Lady Windermeres Vifte) by Oscar Wilde (National Tour, 1912)
- Thérèse Raquin in Thérèse Raquin by Émile Zola (National Tour, 1912)
- Helvig in Svend Dyrings Huus (Norwegian title: Svend Dyrings hus) by Henrik Hertz (Stavanger Theater, 1912)
- Agnete Lindemann in Agnete by Amalie Skram (Hammerfest, 1914)
- Miss Sperling in Det lykkelige valg by Nils Kjær (Central Tour, 1914)

== Filmography ==
- 1917: En vinternat as Per Grunk's sister
- 1917: De Forældreløse
