= Magda Blanc =

Norwegian actress (1879–1959)

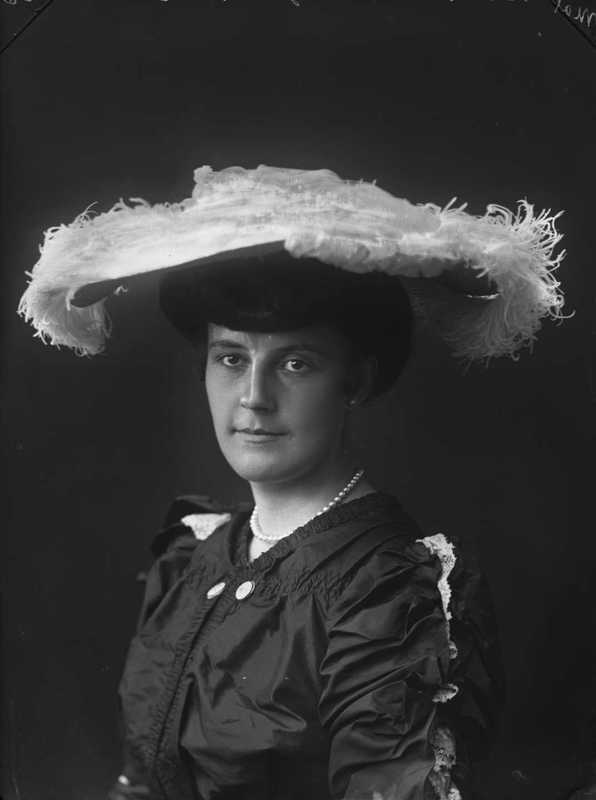
- Magda Blanc in 1906
- Born: March 27, 1879; Bergen, Norway
- Died: April 6, 1959 (aged 80); Bergen, Norway
- Resting place: Ullern Cemetery
- Occupation: Actress
- Spouses: Henning Eriksen (m. 1906–1915) Sverre Jordan (m. 1918–1949)
- Relatives: Tharald Høyerup Blanc

Magda Blanc (March 27, 1879 – April 6, 1959) was a Norwegian actress.

== Career ==
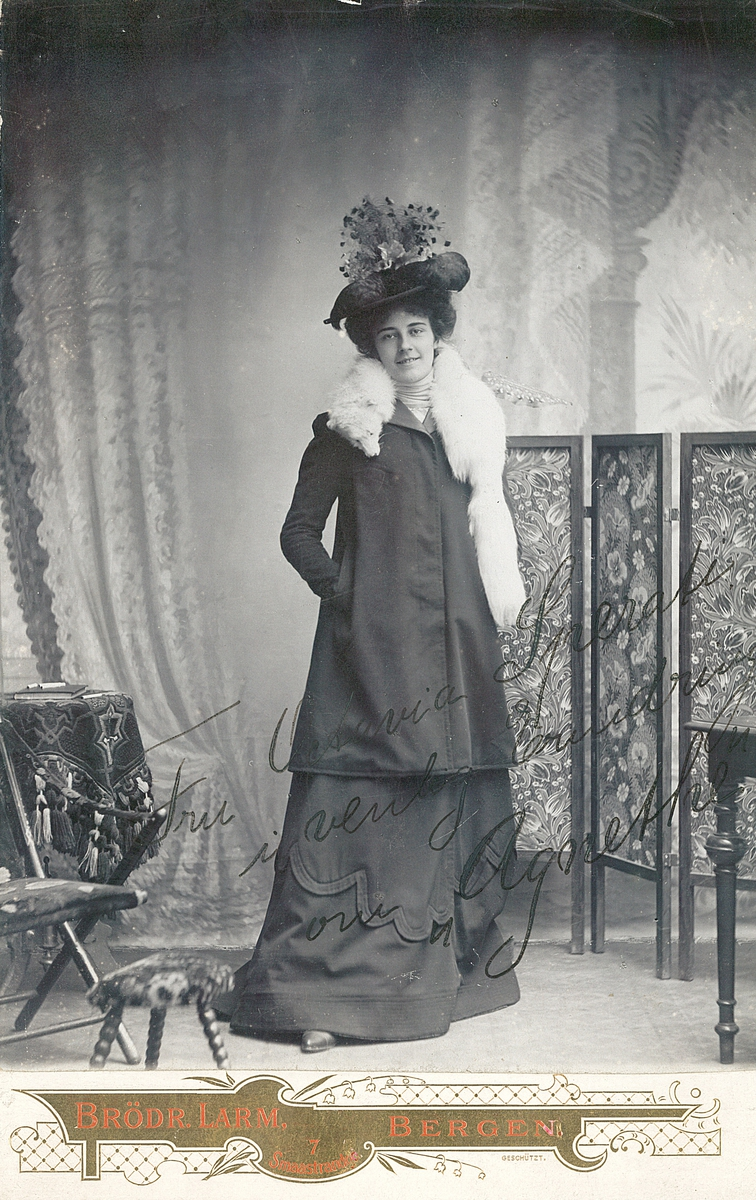
Magda Blanc in the title role in Amalie Skram's play Agnete, photographed by the Larm Brothers in 1901

In 1901 she debuted at the National Theater in her hometown of Bergen in the title role in Amalie Skram's play Agnete. She developed into one of the leading actresses at the theater.

Blanc excelled in both dramatic roles and comedies, and she was also a successful poetry reciter. She received the King's Medal of Merit in gold and was appointed a knight 1st class of the Order of St. Olav. In 1954 she was the recipient of a National Artist's Pension (Norwegian: Statens kunstnerlønn).

== Family ==
Blanc was born in Bergen, the daughter of the bank accountant Adolf Christian Blanc (1840–1918) and Magdalene Thomsen (1853–1928). She was the niece of the theater historian Tharald Høyerup Blanc (1838–1921). In 1906, she married the actor Henning Eriksen (1878–1922). They divorced in 1915, and in 1918 she married the composer Sverre Jordan (1889–1972). They divorced in 1949.
