= Emmy Worm-Müller =

Norwegian actress (1875–1950)

- Emmy Worm-Müller as Ane in Geografi og Kærlighed in 1904
- Born: May 3, 1875; Strinda Municipality, Norway
- Died: August 23, 1950 (aged 75)
- Occupation: Actress
- Parent(s): Johan Lebrecht Hornemann, Helene Sophie Thrane

Emmy Helene Worm-Müller (born Emmy Helene Hornemann, May 3, 1875 – August 23, 1950) was a Norwegian actress.

== Career ==
Worm-Müller starred in some of the earliest Norwegian silent films. Worm-Müller made her debut in 1911 in Fattigdommens forbandelse and then occasionally appeared in films until the 1940s. Her last film role was in 1942, in Rasmus Breistein's Trysil-Knut. In addition, Worm-Müller was a theater actress engaged with the Oslo New Theater and Trøndelag Theater.

== Family ==
Worm-Müller was the daughter of Johan Lebrecht Hornemann (1846–1928), an infantry captain in the Trondheim Brigade, and his wife Helene Sophie Thrane (1842–1905). She was born at the Vestre Fagerli farm in Bakkaunet in the perish of Lade. When she was confirmed, the family was living in the Qvalegården building at Dronningens gate 30 in Trondheim. She was married to the journalist Jacob Worm-Müller (1866–1911), and they were the parents of Helene Ulrikke Amalie Hornemann Worm-Müller and Anna Maria Hornemann Worm-Müller.

== Filmography ==
- 1911: Fattigdommens forbandelse
- 1911: Bondefangeri i Vaterland as Agurka, a prostitute
- 1912: Hemmeligheden as the fisherman's wife
- 1924: Til sæters as Kari
- 1927: Syv dager for Elisabeth as Josefine Hansen, the foster mother
- 1933: En stille flirt as Marte
- 1938: Bør Børson Jr. as Hilda, Bør's wife
- 1939: De vergeløse as Flugum's wife
- 1942: Trysil-Knut as an old woman
