= Ottar Gladtvet =

Norwegian filmmaker (1890–1962)

- Born: September 1, 1890; Kristiania (now Oslo), Norway
- Died: June 9, 1962 (aged 71); Oslo, Norway
- Occupation(s): Film director, film editor, screenwriter, cinematographer, photographer
- Spouse: Solveig Gladtvet

Alf Ottar Gladtvet (September 1, 1890 – June 9, 1962) was a Norwegian filmmaker and pioneer in the film industry. He made documentaries, feature films, commercials, animated films, newsreels. and many short films. He also worked as a cinema machinist and cinema director.

== Family ==
Gladtvet was born in Kristiania (now Oslo), Norway. He was the son of the hardware dealer and cinema owner Carl Otto Severin Gladtvet (1863–1918) and Agnes Elisabet Roshauw (1862–?). He was married to the actress Solveig Gladtvet (1903–1951).

== Feature films ==
Gladtvet directed two feature films in the 1910s. The first feature film was the western-inspired Overfaldet paa postaapnerens datter eller Kampen om pengebrevet from 1913. Gladtvet was only partly involved in the pioneering days of Norwegian cinema, and he sometimes acted as Peter Lykke-Seest's photographer. Already in 1918, however, Gladtvet directed his second feature film, Revolutionens datter. The film premiered at Cirkus Verdensteater in Kristiania on October 14, but it was not a financial success. The press, on the other hand, saw the film as a positive contribution to Norwegian cinematography.

== Travel and documentary films ==
Gladtvet made his first documentary film, Kristiania, in 1912; it was a collection of images of various places in the capital. In his first years as a photographer, he was associated with the family's cinema operation, but in 1922 he established the company Gladtvet Film, which took on all possible film assignments. He was also very involved in film newspaper features and other topical films throughout his photographic career. Gladtvet was greatly responsible for refreshing and promoting Norwegian travel film. His film Raumabanen – Norges nyeste turistbane (Raumabanen: Norway's Newest Tourist Railway) from 1925 depicts scenic surroundings, follows the tourists on board the train and on a mountain tour, and also includes characteristic women in traditional clothing at the end of the film. These women in folk clothing became his hallmark in travel film. In 1939, Ottar Gladtvet made a full-length documentary film that documented the Norwegian royal couple on their journey to the United States: Til Vesterheimen (To Vesterheim). It was produced by Oslo Kinematografer and was first shown as short films in cinemas in Oslo. It chronologically follows the royal couple's journey through the country as they meet many famous people, such as Franklin D. Roosevelt, Sonja Henie, and Henry Ford. In addition to these films, Gladtvet also made exotic travel films, such as Blandt Syd-Amerikas urskovsindianere (Among the Primeval Forest Indians of South America) from 1921.

== Filmography ==
=== As director ===
- 1912: Kristiania
- 1913: Overfaldet paa postaapnerens datter eller Kampen om pengebrevet
- 1918: Revolutionens datter
- 1921: Blandt Syd-Amerikas urskovsindianere
- 1924: Mary og Doug besøker Kristiania
- 1924: Mary og Doug besøker Stockholm
- 1924: Raumabanen – Norges nyeste turistbane
- 1925: Bergensbanen
- 1925: Christiania Spigerverk
- 1925: Fra gullkysten til Freia
- 1926: Tyveriet fra Bagdad
- 1927: Luna sæpen
- 1927: Fiinbeck er rømt
- 1927: Det mystiske kjøkken (noget at glæde seg til)
- 1930: Fra sneblokaden på høifjeldet
- 1930: Med Dovrebanen til Otta
- 1930: Sildebyen Haugesund
- 1930: Sonja Henie
- 1950: Stavanger – St. Svithuns by

=== As cinematographer ===
- 1913: Overfaldet paa postaapnerens datter eller Kampen om pengebrevet
- 1917: Unge hjerter
- 1917: De forældreløse
- 1918: Lodsens datter
- 1918: Revolutionens datter
- 1921: Det nye år? (also producer)
- 1921: Blandt Syd-Amerikas urskovsindianere
- 1924: Raumabanen – Norges nyeste turistbane
- 1925: Bergensbanen
- 1925: Christiania Spigerverk
- 1925: Fra gullkysten til Freia
- 1929: Norge, vårt Norge, i toner og billeder
- 1930: Med Dovrebanen til Otta
- 1930: Sildebyen Haugesund
- 1930: Sonja Henie
- 1936: Vi vil oss et land...
- 1939: Til Vesterheimen
- 1942: Trysil-Knut
- 1943: Bergen
- 1944: Ti gutter og en gjente

=== As screenwriter ===
- 1913: Overfaldet paa postaapnerens datter eller Kampen om pengebrevet
- 1918: Revolutionens datter
