= Unge hjerter =

1917 film

- Directed by: Peter Lykke-Seest
- Written by: Peter Lykke-Seest
- Starring: ? Kittelsen; Henning Eriksen; Jens Selmer; Gunvor Arntzen; Kaare Knudsen
- Cinematography: Ottar Gladtvet; Carl Wieghorst
- Distributed by: Christiania Film Co.
- Release date: September 6, 1916
- Running time: 53 minutes
- Country: Norway
- Language: Norwegian

Unge hjerter (Young Hearts) is a Norwegian silent film from 1917. It is considered lost. According to the cinematographer Ottar Gladtvet, who described the filming in his autobiography, parts of the film were shot outside Røros at Easter.

The film premiered at the Palace Theater on June 9, 1917.

== Plot ==
An engaged couple (Harriet Wold and Ragnar Berntzen) have both fallen in love with someone else: Wang and Anna. They confess this to each other, worried about the other's reaction. However, when it turns out that both are in the same situation, there are new engagements and joy.

== Cast ==
- ? Kittelsen as Harriet Wold
- Henning Eriksen as Ragnar Berntzen
- Jens Selmer as the priest
- Gunvor Arntzen as Anna, the priest's daughter
- Kaare Knudsen as Wang
- Robert Sperati as a Sami
- Hildur Øverland as the priest's housekeeper
