= Danning =

Danning can mean:

- Christian Danning (1867–1925), Danish composer and conductor
- Harry Danning (1911–2004), American Major League Baseball player
- Ike Danning (1905–1983), American Major League Baseball catcher
- Kofi Danning (born 1991), Ghanaian-born Australian footballer
- Sybil Danning (born 1952), Austrian actress, model and film producer
