= Jacob Worm-Müller =

Jacob Worm-Müller may refer to:

- Jacob S. Worm-Müller (1884–1963), Norwegian historian, magazine editor, and professor
- Jacob Worm-Müller (writer) (1866–1911), Norwegian author and journalist
