= Paria (1916) =

1916 film

- Directed by: Peter Lykke-Seest
- Written by: Peter Lykke-Seest
- Starring: Robert Sperati; Reidar Kaas; Henning Eriksen
- Distributed by: Christiania Film Co. A/S
- Release date: 1916
- Country: Norway
- Language: Norwegian

Paria is a Norwegian silent film from 1916. The film was directed by Peter Lykke-Seest, who also wrote the script. It is believed to have been the first film produced by the company Christiania Film Co. A/S. For unknown reasons, the film was never examined by the censorship committee and was therefore never shown in public. The film is considered lost.

== Cast ==
- Robert Sperati as Carsten, a shipowner
- Randi Haanshus as Alice, Carsten's daughter
- Reidar Kaas as Berner, a doctor
- Henning Eriksen as Riego
- Hildur Øverland as Zaima
