= Robert Sperati =

Norwegian actor

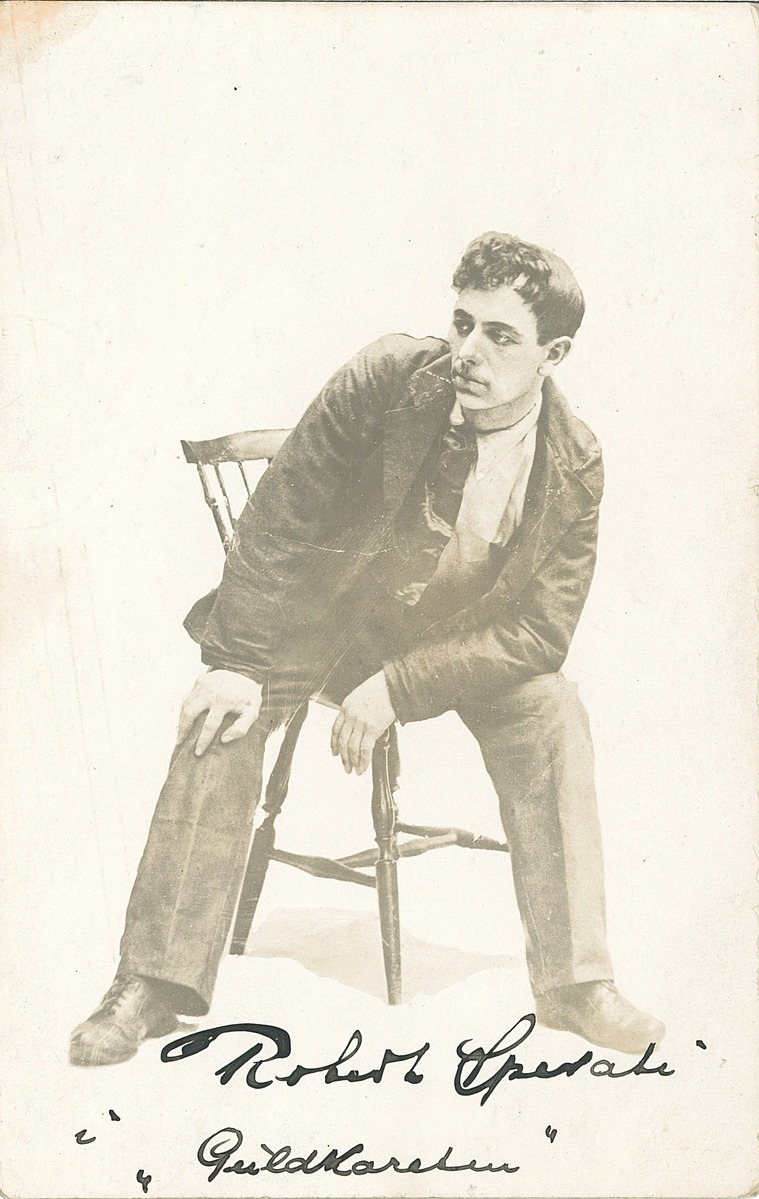
- Born: July 27, 1872; Bergen, Norway
- Died: October 12, 1945 (aged 73)
- Resting place: Vestre gravlund
- Occupation: Actor
- Spouse: Kitty Lossius
- Mother: Octavia Sperati
- Relatives: Lulli Sperati, Carlo Alberto Sperati

Robert Kristian Paolo Sperati (July 27, 1872 – October 12, 1945) was a Norwegian stage actor and film actor from the silent-film era.

== Career ==
Sperati was born in Bergen. He made his debut at the National Theater in Bergen as the aristocrat in Turgenev's Fortune's Fool (Norwegian: Nådsensbrødet) before he had success as Thummelumsen in Gustav Wied's comedy of the same name and in Anthon B. Nilsen's Bedstemors Gut (Grandma's Boy). He later worked in Oslo, at the Central Theater, the Oslo New Theater, and the Open-Air Theater on Bygdøy. He also participated in the first broadcast of the NRK Radio Theater, in the role of the Bøyg in Henrik Ibsen's Peer Gynt (on September 12, 1926).

== Family ==
Sperati was the son of the conductor Robert Sperati (1848–1884) and the actress Octavia Sperati, and the grandson of the conductor and composer Paolo Sperati. He was married to the author Kitty Lossius. He was the nephew of the composer and music professor Carlo Alberto Sperati.

== Filmography ==
- 1911: Fattigdommens forbandelse
- 1911: Hemmeligheden as Halling the landowner
- 1916: Paria as Carsten, an editor
- 1917: En Vinternat as a husband
- 1917: Unge hjerter as a Sami
- 1918: Vor tids helte as Sam
- 1926: Den nye lensmannen as Haugkallen
