= Oscar Gustafson =

Norwegian painter, actor, and film director (1885–1949)

- Born: January 27, 1885; Kristiania (now Oslo), Norway
- Died: January 24, 1949 (aged 63)
- Occupations: Painter, actor, and film director

Oscar Emanuel Gustafson (January 27, 1885 – July 24, 1949) was a Norwegian painter, actor, and film director.

== Family ==
Gustafson was born in Kristiania (now Oslo) in 1885, the son of Karl Richard Gustafsson (1848–1938) and Sofie Bryngelsson (1847–1903). He was married to Alfrida Strandberg (1886–?) and later to Karen Sörensen (1908–1972).

== Career ==
In 1917, Gustafson directed the film En vinternat (together with Peter Lykke-Seest) and played the leading role as the university lecturer Wollert Berg. Gustafson was also responsible for decorations and makeup. In 1919 he directed De forældreløse (also with Lykke-Seest) and played the role of Robertson.

As a painter, Gustafson dubbed himself Sørlandsmaleren 'the Southern Norway painter'.

== Filmography ==
- 1917: En vinternat as Wollert Berg, a university lecturer
- 1917: De Forældreløse as Robertson
