= Æresgjesten =

1919 Norwegian film

- Directed by: Peter Lykke-Seest
- Written by: Peter Lykke-Seest
- Starring: Esben Lykke-Seest; Arthur Barking; Helen Storm; Thorvald Meyer; Oscar Amundsen; Hans Ingi Hedemark
- Cinematography: Carl-Axel Söderström
- Edited by: Peter Lykke-Seest
- Distributed by: Christiania Film Co.
- Release date: 1919
- Running time: 53 minutes
- Country: Norway
- Language: Norwegian

Æresgjesten (The Guest of Honor) is a Norwegian film from 1919 directed by Peter Lykke-Seest. It is considered lost.

It was previously assumed that the film had not been shown publicly, but evidence has been found that it was shown in Hamar in 1919.

== Plot ==
The consul general wants Klara James to marry a count, but he turns out to be a spy.

== Cast ==
- Esben Lykke-Seest as Edvard
- Arthur Barking as Frank
- Helen Storm as Klara James, a widow
- Thorvald Meyer as Robert, Klara James's son
- Oscar Amundsen as the count
- Hans Ingi Hedemark
- Lila Lykke-Seest
