= Hans Ingi Hedemark =

Norwegian opera singer and actor (1875–1930)

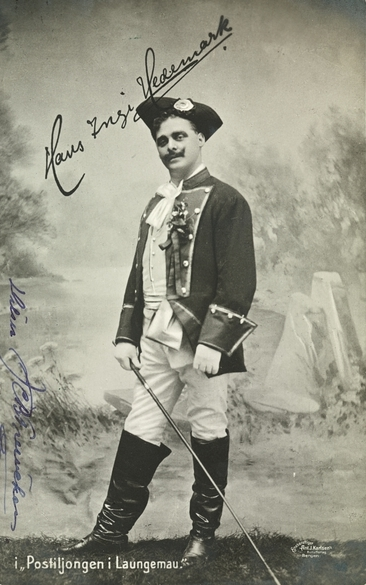
- Hans Ingi Hedemark in Le postillon de Lonjumeau, 1903
- Born: September 21, 1875; Kristiania (now Oslo), Norway
- Died: June 21, 1930 (aged 54); Oslo, Norway
- Occupation: Actor
- Spouse(s): Linken Hedemark; Marie Hedemark

Hans Ingi Hedemark (September 21, 1875 – June 21, 1930) was a Norwegian opera singer (a tenor) and an actor.

== Career ==
Hans Ingi Hedemark made his debut at the Christiania Theater in 1896 in Otto Sinding's play Iraka. Hedemark was engaged with the National Theater in Bergen in 1899 as both an opera singer and a character actor. He recorded 78 rpm records on the Gramophone label for Brødrene Johnsen A/S. Hedemark also appeared in film roles. He died on June 21, 1930.

== Opera roles (selected) ==
- 1901: La belle Hélène (Norwegian: Den skjønne Helene) as Pâris
- 1902: La bohème as Rodolpho
- 1902: Les dragons de Villars (Norwegian: Villars Dragoner) as Sylvain
- 1902: Le postillon de Lonjumeau (Norwegian: Postillionen i Longemeau) as Chapelou
- 1903: Kynthia as Agaton
- 1904: La fille du régiment (Norwegian: Regimentets datter) as Tonio

== Filmography ==
- 1911: Bondefangeri i Vaterland as Ola Snippen
- 1911: Fattigdommens forbandelse
- 1911: Under forvandlingens lov as a singer
- 1917: De Forældreløse as Sam the boatman
- 1918: Lodsens datter as the pilot
- 1919: Æresgjesten as Robert, Klara James's son
- 1919: Historien om en gut as the boatman
