= Edmund Stinnes =

German manufacturer (1896–1980)

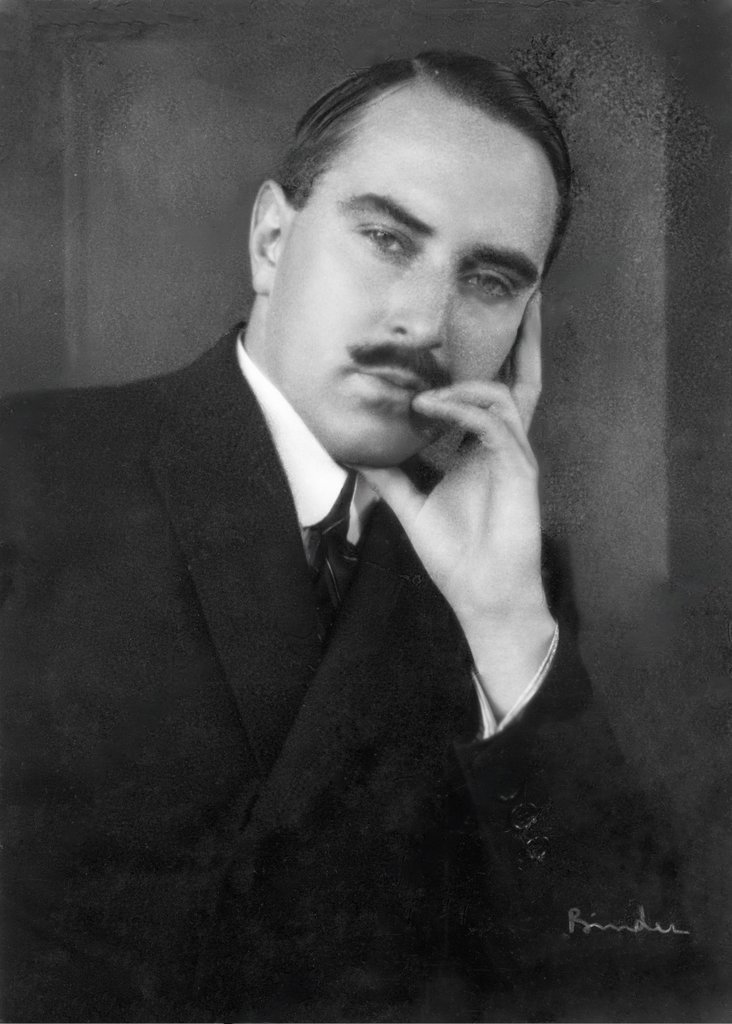
- Stinnes, c. 1925
- Born: Edmund Hugo Stinnes; 23 March 1896; Mülheim, German Empire
- Died: 11 August 1980 (aged 84); Ascona, Switzerland
- Education: Technische Universität Berlin (PhD)
- Occupation: Industrialist
- Spouses: Emilie Margarethe Hartmann (m. 1923; div. 1926) Margiana von Schulze-Gaevernitz (m. 1930)
- Father: Hugo Stinnes
- Relatives: Gerhart von Schulze-Gaevernitz (father-in-law); Gero von Schulze-Gaevernitz (brother-in-law); Mathias Stinnes (great-grandfather)

Edmund Hugo Stinnes (23 March 1896 – 11 August 1980) was a German-born American industrialist, professor and heir who was primarily based in the United States. He was the oldest son of Hugo Stinnes.

== Early life and education ==
Stinnes was born 23 March 1896 in Mülheim, German Empire, the eldest of seven children, born to Hugo Stinnes and Clara Stinnes (née Wagenknecht). Stinnes was raised in his city of birth where his father had a variety of business interests mainly in the coal and mining industry. He attended Staatliches Gymnasium and then studied mechanical engineering at the Technische Hochschule Charlottenburg (now Technische Universität Berlin), where he completed his PhD in 1922.

== Emigration and career ==
In the mid-1930s, Stinnes and his wife permanently relocated to the United States, where he began teaching at Haverford College in Haverford, Pennsylvania. He later became a U.S. citizen. His financial help assisted several Jewish refugees to immigrate to the United States.

In 1945, Stinnes provided his house on Lake Maggiore as a conference point for Allen Dulles and the Office of Strategic Services in ceasefire negotiations. The negotiations on the American side were led by his brother-in-law Gero von Schulze-Gaevernitz.

== Personal life ==
Stinnes was briefly married to Emilie Margarethe Hartmann, with whom he had two children. In 1930, he wed Margiana "Marga" von Schulze-Gaevernitz, who was a daughter of former member of the Reichstag, Gerhart von Schulze-Gaevernitz. They had two daughters together, one of whom was Veronica Margiana Stinnes (1933–2021). Stinnes was a naturalized U.S. citizen.
