= Tivoli Opera =

Opera stage in Oslo, Norway

Coordinates: 59.9131°N 10.7335°E

Tivoli Opera (established 1882, closed 1886) was Norway's first permanent opera stage, located in the converted banquet hall of Tivoli in Oslo. It was led by opera singer Olefine Moe (artistic director), assisted by Swedish Matilda Lundström (administrative director).

The opera was nicknamed Mattis & Moe and was thus, unusually for the time, led by two women. The artistic director was first the Italian Paolo Sperati, later the young Hjalmar Meissner. Several of the nearly twenty singers came from the Royal Dramatic Theatre, where Moe had spent several successful years, and there was a small orchestra and a small ensemble for ballet.

They were the first permanent opera stage in the country to stage almost twenty world premieres. This was in 1883 with Fredrich von Flotow's Martha, The Barber of Seville, Rigoletto, The Beggar Student and The Marriage of Figaro. In 1884 they continued with Carmen, La traviata and others. Olefine Moe had most of the leading roles. There was also a tour to Bergen and Oslo (1885). The last production was Lohengrin (1886).
