= Ludvig Müller =

Norwegian actor and theatre director (1868–1922)

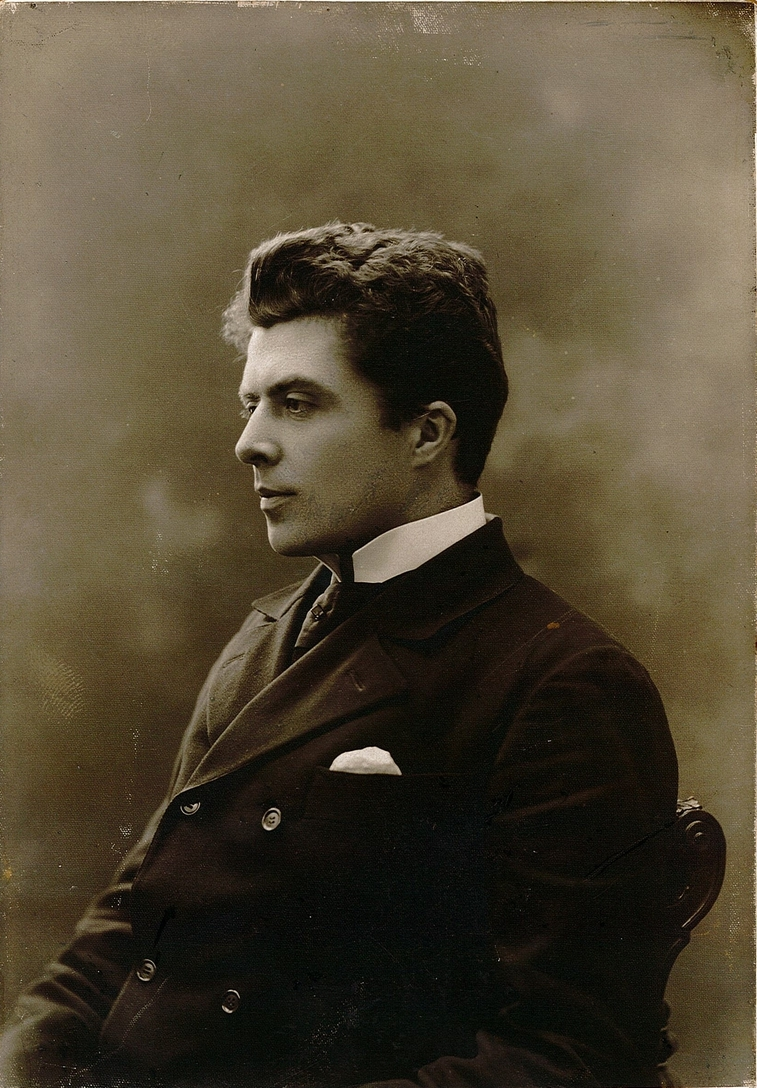
- Born: 29 February 1868; Bergen, Norway
- Died: 1 October 1922 (aged 54)
- Occupations: Actor and theatre director
- Parent: Amalie Skram

Ludvig Müller (29 February 1868 – 1 October 1922) was a Norwegian actor and theatre director.

Although he started as a local businessman in his hometown of Bergen in 1884, having his own business in operation from 1892, Ludvig made his stage debut at Christiania Theater in 1897. He stayed there for two years before moving on to stay for thirteen years at the newly established Nationaltheatret in 1899. Müller chaired the Norwegian Actors' Equity Association from 1901 to 1903, and from 1907 to 1913. From 1913 to 1916, he was the theatre director at Trondhjems nationale Scene in Trondheim, a city much farther north. He died at the German spa town Bad Nauheim in 1922, after having finished a manuscript for Den nye lensmannen, a silent movie released in 1926, four years after his death.

== Family ==
He was born in Bergen as the son of writer Amalie Skram (1846–1905), in her first marriage to ship captain Bernt Ulrik August Müller (1837–98) of Bergen. His brother Jacob Worm Müller (1866–1911) became a journalist and writer.

In 1895, he married Signe Grieg (1868–1960), a cousin of the composer Edvard Grieg. Their son John Grieg Müller (1898–1938) wrote plays, whereas their daughter Else Ulrikke Ludvigsdatter Grieg Müller (1900–76) became an actress and was married in 1933 to Erik Kristen-Johanssen (1901–76), business director and theatre director at Nationaltheatret.

Ludvig married for a second time in 1912 to singer Margit Lunde (1881–1976), who accompanied Ludvig while touring the Nordic countries and also performed at Centralteatret 1907–14. In 1917, Margit Lunde-Müller had a role in the silent movie Fjeldpigen as well as in the 1934 Swedish-language movie En stille flirt.
