= Revolutionens datter =

1918 film

- Directed by: Ottar Gladtvet
- Written by: Ottar Gladtvet
- Starring: Solveig Gladtvet
- Cinematography: Ottar Gladtvet
- Distributed by: Gladtvet-film
- Release date: October 14, 1918
- Running time: 52 minutes
- Country: Norway
- Language: Norwegian

Revolutionens datter (The Daughter of the Revolution) is a Norwegian silent film from 1918 directed by Ottar Gladtvet. It has been restored and preserved.

== Plot ==
The film tells the story of Albert Fjeld, a worker at a shipyard, and Claire Staalhammer, the shipyard manager's daughter. Albert acts as a spokesman for the workers when they make a demand for a pay rise, which Staalhammer rejects. The workers do not accept this, and they start a revolt. Albert, who has fallen in love with Claire, manages to save her when the workers storm the manager's residence, and they flee to a neighboring country, where Claire gets to live with a friend of her father, the landowner Dalton. Dalton's son tries to impress Claire, but she is not interested in him. Claire is eventually told that order has been restored in her home country, and that she has inherited almost a million kroner. Because of the money, the landowner Dalton is happy to see his son marry Claire, and she feels it would be rude to refuse outright because Dalton has shown her great hospitality. She therefore proposes a boxing match between Albert and the landowner's son to decide who will marry her. Albert wins the match, and five years later we see them living happily in their homeland.

== Cast ==
- Solveig Gladtvet as Claire Staalhammer, the daughter of the shipyard manager
- Fredrik Andersen as Staalhammer, the manager of the Wulkan Shipyard
- Fred Boston as Jack Dalton, the landowner's son
- Thomas Boston as Tommy Fjeld, Albert and Claire's son
- Waldemar Holberg as Albert Fjeld, a sheet metal worker
- Johannes Price as Dalton, the landowner
