= Lila Lykke-Seest =

Norwegian actress and writer (1883–1954)

- Born: Anna Fredrikke Andersen; September 26, 1883; Fredrikshald (now Halden), Norway
- Died: March 19, 1954 (aged 70); Oslo, Norway
- Occupation(s): Actress and writer
- Spouse: Peter Lykke-Seest
- Children: Esben Lykke-Seest

Anna Fredrikke "Lila" Lykke-Seest (née Andersen, September 26, 1883 – March 19, 1954) was a Norwegian actress and writer.

== Family ==
Lila Lykke-Seest was the daughter of the warehouse worker Jens Martin Andersen (1841–1917) and Andrine Fredrikke Johnsen (1842–1913). In 1903 she married the writer, film producer, and film director Peter Lykke-Seest (1868–1948). They were the parents of the actor Esben Lykke-Seest (1905–1988).

== Career ==
Lykke-Seest published two children's books in 1906, Lulli and Vetle-Kari, under the pseudonym Lila. Her debut work Lulli is a story from Kristiania, a so-called Backfischroman (teenage girl novel) about teenage life and flirting. The story in Vetle-Kari, which was published later the same year, takes place in the countryside.

She later appeared in two of her husband's silent films. She played the lead role in the 1918 film Lodsens datter, and the following year she played a minor role in Æresgjesten as Edvard's mother in the third of the so-called "Esben films". Her son Esben Lykke-Seest played the role of Edvard in the film. She also played the mother in the film Historien om en gut.

== Bibliography ==
- 1906: Lulli (Copenhagen: Gyldendalske boghandel)
- 1906: Vetle-Kari – Barnedagene (Copenhagen: Gyldendalske boghandel)

== Filmography ==
- 1918: Lodsens datter as the pilot's daughter, Anna
- 1919: Historien om en gut as Esben's mother
- 1919: Æresgjesten
