= De forældreløse =

- Directed by: Peter Lykke-Seest
- Written by: Peter Lykke-Seest
- Starring: Esben Lykke-Seest; Lullu Hansteen
- Cinematography: Ottar Gladtvet
- Release date: 21 November 1917
- Running time: 63 minutes
- Country: Norway
- Language: Norwegian

De forældreløse (English: The Orphans) was a 1917 Norwegian drama film written and directed by Peter Lykke-Seest, starring Esben Lykke-Seest and Lullu Hansteen. The siblings Beate and Jens Coldevin are heirs to a great fortune, and their warden Robertson is trying to get his hands on the money. The film is today considered lost.

== Cast ==
- Esben Lykke-Seest as Lille-Jens (Little Jens)
- Lullu Hansteen as Beate Coldevin
- Oscar Gustafson as Robertson
- Hans Ingi Hedemark as Sam the boatman
- Arthur Barking as Store-Jens (Big Jens)
- Botten Soot as Mrs. Klingenberg
- Karin Meyer as the dance enthusiast
- Thurid Hetland
