= Overfaldet paa postaapnerens datter =

1913 film

- Directed by: Ottar Gladtvet
- Written by: Ottar Gladtvet
- Starring: Solveig Gladtvet
- Cinematography: Ottar Gladtvet
- Distributed by: Kristiania Filmkompagni
- Release date: March 8, 1913
- Country: Norway
- Language: Norwegian

Overfaldet paa postaapnerens datter eller Kampen om pengebrevet (The Assault on the Postman's Daughter, or The Battle for the Money Order) is a Norwegian silent film from 1913 directed by Ottar Gladtvet. It was a Western-inspired melodrama. The film is considered lost.

== Plot ==
For many years, the local postman John Munkevold has delivered the mail in his large district. In recent years, however, he has been plagued by gout, and therefore his daughter Ingrid often collects the mail at the station for him. Ingrid is also sent there on this day, and at the station she meets her boyfriend Harry Brown, who works on the train. She receives the mail sack and a letter with a money order. When she waves goodbye, she drops the letter, and a vagrant from Kristiania picks it up. Before he hands it back, he reads what is written on it: "Enebak Stone Mills Co. Banko NOK 5,000." Ingrid grabs the letter and rushes home. Together with a friend, the vagrant follows Ingrid to steal the letter.

Ingrid comes home and gives the postbag and the letter to her father. He then sees that the letter is marked "express mail" and therefore asks Ingrid to deliver it immediately. When the vagrants hear this, they take a shortcut to catch up with Ingrid. At the same time, Harry is on his way home, not far from John Munkevold's house. While Ingrid is walking on the road, she is attacked by the vagrants. They steal the letter and set off. Harry appears and she tells him what has happened. Harry understands that he needs help to stop the robbers, and he calls the police from the nearest farm.

The vagrants have come a long way, and they have stopped in an outbuilding to examine their loot. However, they do not realize that they have been pursued by the police. One vagrant is captured, but the other escapes. He rushes to the train station and is just in time to jump on the train before it departs. Harry takes a car and drives after the train toward the next station. When the vagrant sees the car driving alongside the train, he fires at it, and the police return fire. Later they find the vagrant dead with the letter in his hand. The police take care of the body, and Harry returns home. There he is rewarded for his courage, and he receives Ingrid's and her father's consent and blessing.

== Cast ==
- Solveig Gladtvet as Ingrid Munkevold, the postman's daughter
