= The Story of a Boy =

Historien om en gut
- Directed by: Peter Lykke-Seest
- Written by: Peter Lykke-Seest
- Starring: Esben Lykke-Seest; Hans Ingi Hedemark; Emil Schibbye
- Cinematography: Carl-Axel Söderström
- Release date: 4 April 1919
- Running time: 80 minutes
- Country: Norway
- Language: Norwegian

The Story of a Boy (Norwegian: Historien om en gut) is a 1919 Norwegian drama film written and directed by Peter Lykke-Seest, starring his son Esben Lykke-Seest. The film is extant.

The film was screened as part of a retrospective of 100-year-old films at the Il Cinema Ritrovato film festival in 2019.

== Cast ==
- Esben Lykke-Seest as Esben
- Lila Lykke-Seest as Esben's mother
- Hans Ingi Hedemark as the boatman
- Emil Schibbye as the skipper of the Bella Rosa
