= Lodsens datter =

1918 film

- Directed by: Peter Lykke-Seest
- Written by: Peter Lykke-Seest
- Starring: Hans Ingi Hedemark; Helene Due; Lila Lykke-Seest; Sigurd Johansen; Gotfred Johansen; Clarita Husebye
- Cinematography: Ottar Gladtvet
- Distributed by: Internationalt Films-Kompani AS
- Release date: February 6, 1918
- Running time: 44 minutes
- Country: Norway
- Language: Norwegian

Lodsens datter (The Pilot's Daughter) is a Norwegian film from 1918 directed by Peter Lykke-Seest. It is considered lost.

The work was part of a genre of "daughter" films in fashion at the time in Scandinavian cinema, with similar titles including Alkymistens Datter (The Alchemist's Daughter), Bryggerens Datter (The Brewer's Daughter, 1912), Direktørens Datter (The Director's Daughter, 1912), Folkeførerens Datter (The Leader's Daughter, 1913), Gøglerens Datter (The Entertainer's Daughter, 1913), Guvernørens Datter (The Governor's Daughter, 1912), Herremandens Datter (The Gentleman's Daughter, 1907), Satans Datter (The Devil's Daughter, 1913), and Skipperens Datter (The Skipper's Daughter, 1907).

== Plot ==
The film tells the story of a painter that meets the daughter of a pilot, takes her to the city, and lives with her until he meets a rich lady and marries her. The scorned girl then travels home, alone and unhappy.

== Cast ==
- Gotfred Johansen as the painter
- Lila Lykke-Seest as the pilot's daughter, Anna
- Helene Due as the pilot's wife
- Hans Ingi Hedemark as the pilot
- Clarita Husebye as the rich lady
- Sigurd Johansen as Anna's boyfriend
- Hildur Øverland
