= Henning Eriksen =

Norwegian actor

- Born: February 28, 1878; Kristiania (now Oslo), Norway
- Died: October 1, 1922 (aged 44); Oslo, Norway
- Occupation: Actor
- Spouse: Magda Blanc

Henning Eriksen (February 28, 1878 – October 1, 1922, surname sometimes Erichsen) was a Norwegian actor.

Eriksen made his stage debut in 1903 at the Central Theater in Oslo, and from 1904 to 1912 he was engaged with the National Theater in Bergen. There, among other performances, he distinguished himself in the role of Einar in Henrik Ibsen's play Brand. Eriksen also appeared in films in both Norway and Denmark. His film debut was in 1913 in the Danish silent film Højt spil, and he appeared in a total of six films from 1913 to 1917.

Eriksen was married to the actress Magda Blanc from 1906 to 1915. They were the parents of a daughter, Magda Blanc-Eriksen, and a son, the actor Henning Blanc.

== Filmography ==
- 1913: Høit spil (credited as Henning Erichsen)
- 1913: Styrmandens sidste fart (credited as Henning Erichsen)
- 1913: De nygifte
- 1913: Kongens foged
- 1916: Paria as Riego
- 1917: Unge hjerter as Ragnar Bentzen
