= Esben Lykke-Seest =

Norwegian actor (1905–1988)

- Born: July 10, 1905; Aker, Norway
- Died: February 8, 1988 (aged 82)
- Occupation: Actor
- Parents: Peter Lykke-Seest (father); Lila Lykke-Seest (mother)

Esben Lykke-Seest (July 10, 1905 – February 8, 1988) was a Norwegian child actor.

Lykke-Seest was the son of the writer, film producer, and film director Peter Lykke-Seest and the actress and children's author Lila Lykke-Seest. He appeared in three films in the 1910s directed by his father. He debuted in 1917 in De forældreløse, in which he played Lille-Jens (Little Johnny). In 1919 he appeared as Edvard in Æresgjesten, and he played the lead role of Esben in Historien om en gut. The three films are sometimes referred to as the "Esben films." Historien om en gut was a success in both Norway and internationally, and it led to an offer for him to play in Hollywood—which, however, he declined.

== Filmography ==
- 1917: De forældreløse as Lille-Jens
- 1919: Æresgjesten as Edvard
- 1919: Historien om en gut as Esben
