= Sverre Jordan =

Norwegian composer, orchestra conductor and pianist

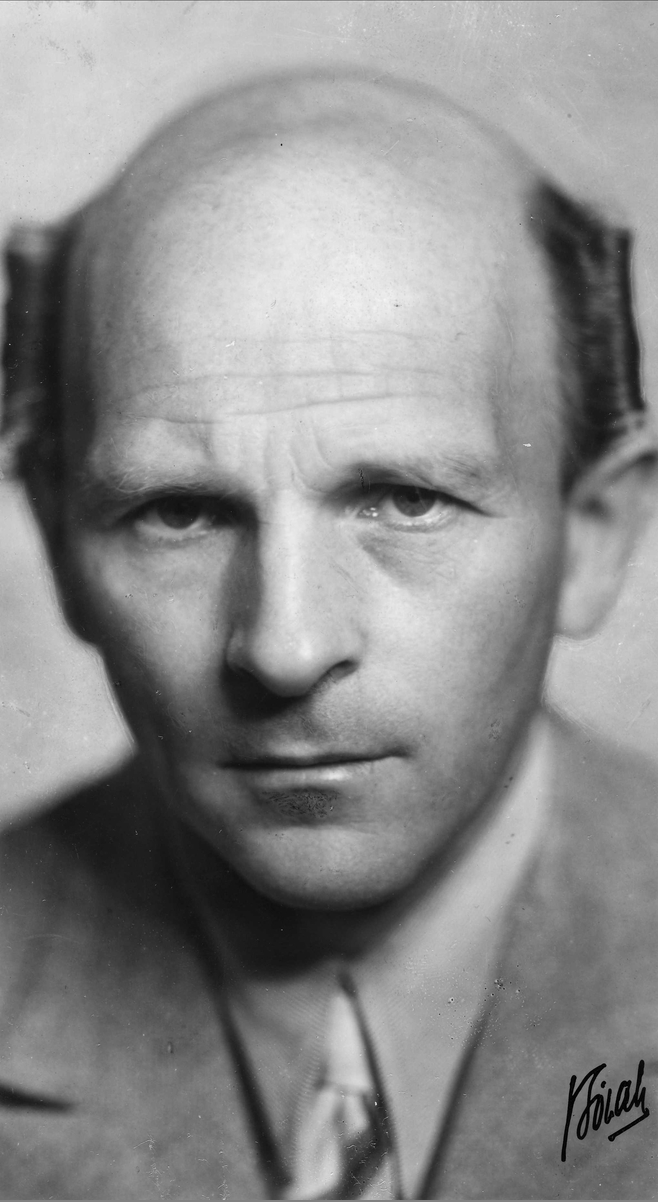
- Jordan around 1930.
- Born: 25 May 1889; Bergen, Norway
- Died: 10 January 1972 (aged 82); Bergen, Norway
- Era: Romantic

Sverre Jordan (25 May 1889 – 10 January 1972) was a Norwegian composer, orchestra conductor, and pianist.

== Biography ==
Jordan was born into the family of Kaspar Joachim Jordan (1859–1924), an insurance agent, and Anne Marie Margrethe Kjærbye (1866–1935) from Denmark. He was initially married to actress Magda Blanc from 1918 to 1949, and later to actress Nina Sandvik Kristensen (29 March 1920 – 30 October 1996) starting in 1949. The family had a strong musical background, as depicted in a painting showing Jordan's grandfather, Caspar Jordan, at the spinet. One of his aunts was a renowned pianist in Denmark, although Jordan himself was not destined to become "the musician" of the family.

After completing middle school at Bergen katedralskole, his father wanted him to attend the newly established trade school in Bergen. Jordan, however, worked for several years at the oil company Vestlandske Petroleumskompagni before his father recognized his son's true calling in music. In 1959, he was honored with the title of Knight of the 1st order in the Royal Norwegian Order of St. Olav.

== Music ==
In 1906 he made his first composition Nat. He went to Berlin and studied under Teresa Carreño and Conrad Ansorge from 1907 to 1914, and studied composition with Wilhelm Klatte. His piano debut took place in Bergen, 1911. He studied piano with Nina Hagerup (Mrs Grieg), and went on a successful world tour for eight years. He performed as an accompanist with Kirsten Flagstad and Marian Anderson. In 1932, he became musical director of Den Nationale Scene, the theatre in Bergen. He led opera performances and pieces for theatre. In addition, he was conductor of Harmonien, the predecessor of the Bergen Philharmonic Orchestra and its associated choir. Here he gave about a hundred concerts. In the meantime, he taught and wrote articles as musical reviewer for Morgenavisen in Bergen. For 50 years (1916–66), he was chairman of the Philharmonic's Music Board of Directors, for several years the Chairman of the program Committee. From the start, he was also in the program Committee and advised for the Bergen International Festival. He was an honorary member of the Bergen Filharmoniske Orkester, and was awarded the gold medal chain in 1966. In the Grieghallen, there is furnished an honorary place for Sverre Jordan.

== Works ==
His body of work consists of approximately 200 opus numbered works divided into over 85 opuses. He further expanded on the Norwegian romance style used by Edvard Grieg and Ole Bull. This makes him somewhat conservative concerning developments within the classical music of the 20th century. While still young he could be characterized as radically innovative.

=== Theatre music (in selection) ===
- Halte-Hulda (lyriks: B. Bjørnson), op. 20, performed in 1919.
- Purpur (lyriks: H. Meidell), op. 24, performed in 1923.
- Children's comedy Kari, Mari og Prinsen, op. 48.
- Romeo and Juliet (lyriks: W. Shakespeare), op. 55, performed in 1951.
- Jean de France (lyriks: L. Holberg) for 4 musicians, op. 62, performed in 1956.
- Magritt (lyriks: J. Falkberget/Isefjær), op. 72, performed in 1960.

=== Orchestral works (in selection) ===
- 1911: Suite in the Old Style, op. 4.
- 1921: Norvegiana, op. 22.
- 1938: Holberg Silhuoets, op. 39.
- 1945: Norwegian Suite, op. 47.
- 1950: Norwegian Rapsody, op. 53.
- 1953: Three Vals Intermezzi, op. 58.
- 1959: Festspill Opening, op. 67.
- 1960: Serenade for Strings, op. 68.
- 1962: Legend, op. 78.
- Lyrical Suite, op. 85.

=== Solo instruments with orchestra ===
- 1945: Piano Concerto no. 1 in E minor, op. 45.
- 1947: Cellokonserto in D minor, op. 45.
- 1957; Horn Concerto in C major, op. 63.
- 1963: Concerto Piccolo for Piano and Orchestra in F major, op. 77.
- 1966: Fiolinkonsert in G minor, op. 82.

=== Vocals with orchestra (in selection) ===
- 1917: Feberdigte (lyriks: K. Hamsun), op. 13.
- 1928: Norge (lyriks: N. Grieg), Cantata for soloists, choir and Orchestra, op. 32.
- 1957: Kongen (lyriks: N. Grieg), melodrama for choir and Orchestra, op. 64.

=== Chamber music ===
- 1917: Sonata no. 1 in G minor for Violin and Piano, op. 16.
- 1955: Sonatina for Flaute and Piano, op. 61.
- 1958: Trio no. 1 for Piano, Violin and Cello in F major, op. 65.
- 1963: Trio no. 2 in C minor, op. 76.
- 1960: Strykekvartett in A minor, op. 71.

=== Piano concerts (in selection) ===
- 1963: Sonata in G minor, op. 79.

=== Choir works ===
- 2 Sange for blandet kor, op. 17
- 2 Sange for mannskor, op. 28
- 2 mannskorsanger, op. 49
- 2 Sange for mannskor, op. 59
- 2 åndelige sange for kor, op. 74
- Flagget for blandet kor, op. 84

=== Bibliography ===
- 1954: Edvard Grieg, an overview of his life and work.
- 1973: Fra et langt kunstnerliv (auto biography).

== Concert ==
- 30 October 1911: Concert with Cally Monrad, in the theatre of Stavanger with works of Jordan.
