= Constance Ring =

1885 novel by Amalie Skram

Constance Ring is an 1885 Norwegian novel by Amalie Skram. The novel was written in 1883 and was delayed until Amalie was able to publish it.
