= Fattigdommens forbandelse =

1911 film

- Directed by: Halfdan Nobel Roede
- Written by: Victor Mogens
- Starring: Signe Danning; Hans Ingi Hedemark; Pehr Qværnstrøm
- Cinematography: Henrik Jaenzon
- Distributed by: Internationalt Filmskompani
- Release date: October 7, 1911
- Country: Norway
- Language: Norwegian

Fattigdommens forbandelse (The Curses of Poverty) is a Norwegian silent film that premiered at the Kosmorama Theater in Kristiania (now Oslo) on October 7, 1911.

The film is considered the first Norwegian feature film, and was also announced as "the first Norwegian art film" (Den første norske kunstfilm). It was directed by Halfdan Nobel Roede, who also directed the films Under forvandlingens lov (1911), Alt for Norge (1912), and Hemmeligheden (1912).

The film is considered lost, and so its exact content is not known, but the film was described as a "a mini-drama on the shady side of life in three acts" (minodrama paa Livets Skyggeside i 3 Akter). The indoor scenes were filmed at Riis farm in Vestre Aker. The outdoor scene was partly filmed in Son, and partly elsewhere.
