= Hugo Stinnes =

German industrialist and politician (1870–1924)

MdR Hugo Stinnes
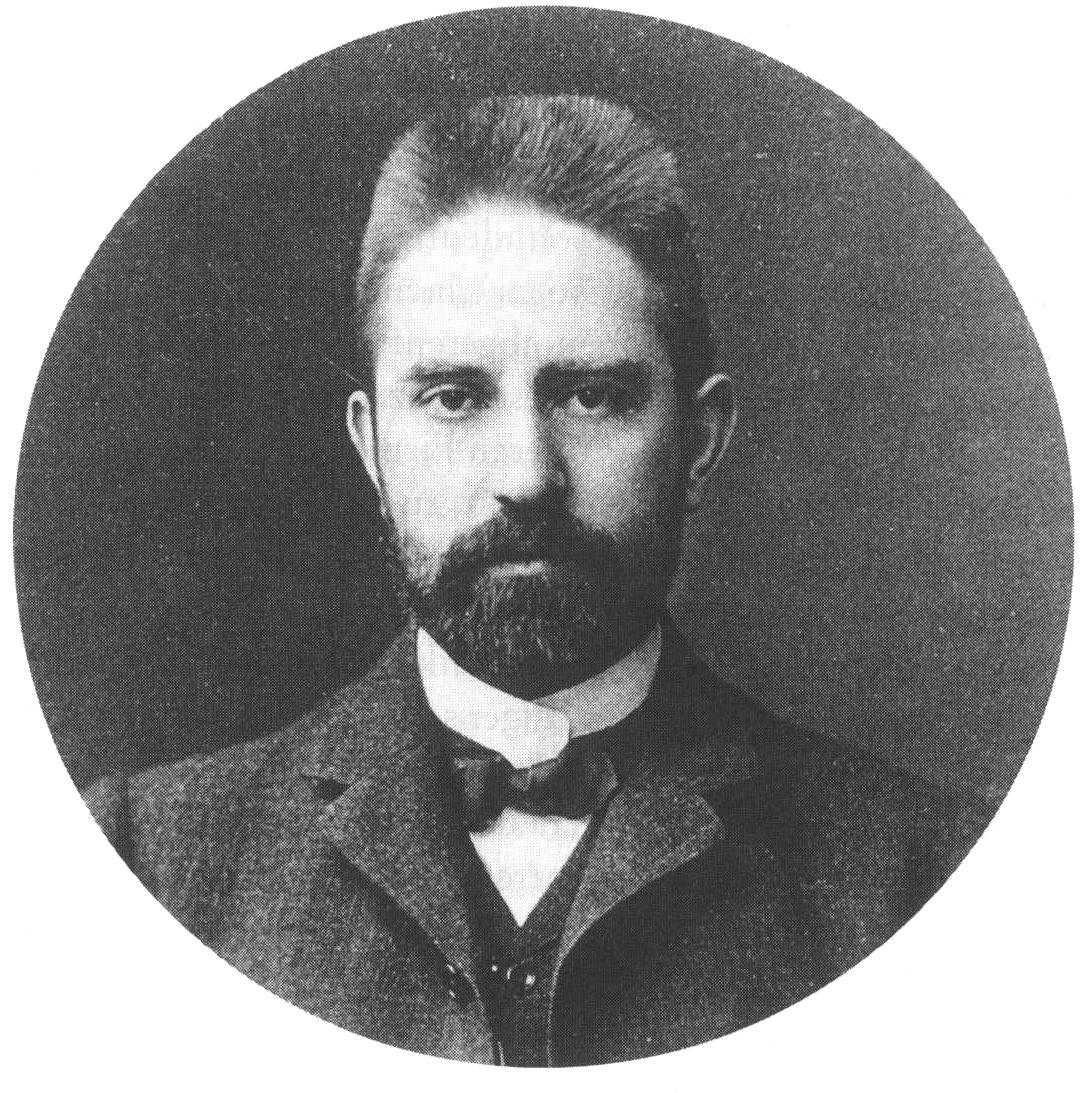
- Stinnes, c. 1890

Member of Reichstag
- In office 4 May 1920 – 10 April 1924 (his death)
- Constituency: Duisburg, Province of Westphalia

Personal details
- Born: Hugo Adolf Eugen Victor Stinnes; 12 February 1870 Mülheim, North German Confederation
- Died: 10 April 1924 (aged 54) Berlin, Weimar Republic
- Party: German People's Party
- Spouse: Clara Wagenknecht (m. 1895)
- Children: 7, including Clärenore
- Occupation: Industrialist, philanthropist, politician

Hugo Adolf Eugen Victor Stinnes colloquially Hugo Stinnes (German pronunciation: [ˈhuːɡoː ˈʃtɪnəs]; 12 February 1870 – 10 April 1924) was a German industrialist, philanthropist and politician who served as Member of the Reichstag from 1920 to 1924 (his death).

He was often dubbed Inflation King or Czar of New Germany being one of the most influential entrepreneurs during the late era of the German Empire and early Weimar Republic. His conglomerate controlled approximately 15 to 20 percent of the German economy at its peak.

== Early life and education ==
Stinnes was born 12 February 1870 in Mülheim, North German Confederation (presently Germany), the third of four children, to Hermann Hugo Stinnes (1842–1887) and Catherine Sophie "Adeline" Stinnes (née Coupienne; 1844–1925), into an affluent family. His siblings were; Heinrich Stinnes (1867–1932), Christine Adeline Fischer (née Stinnes; 1868–1948) and Gustav Ernst Stinnes (1878–1943).

His paternal family belonged to the well established bourgeois families of Mülheim that became wealthy in the early 19th century through merchant and mining activities in the Ruhr valley. His paternal great-grandfather, Jean Baptiste Coupienne (1768–1825), was a Walloon emigrant from Dinant, who became a pioneer of the leather industry in Mülheim, a free mason and official.

Stinnes completed schooling in Mülheim passing his graduation examination from secondary school (Realschule) followed by a commercial apprenticeship at the firm of Carl Spaeter in Koblenz. In order to familiarize with the family investments in mining, Stinnes briefly worked as a miner himself at the Wiethe colliery. In 1889, he attended some studies of instruction at Bergakademie Berlin (merged with Technische Hochschule in 1916).

== Professional career ==
In 1890, he inherited his father's coal mining and other financial enterprises.

=== Building a conglomerate ===
Gradually, from working in the coal industry, he purchased his own shipyard. He also began to purchase seagoing vessels as well as river steamers and barges, the latter—especially on the Rhine—on a constantly increasing scale. He next organized an extensive international business in coal, and had 13 steamers trading to and from North Sea, Baltic, Mediterranean and Black Sea ports. They carried coal, wood, grain and iron ore. By the age of 23, Stinnes was heavily invested in the steel industry. He also imported great quantities of English coal and had an agency at Newcastle as well as an interest in some English mines. This led to his establishing branches of his business at Hamburg and at Rotterdam.

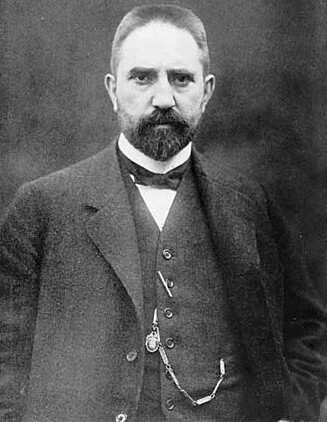
Hugo Stinnes in 1900

Since its founding in 1898, Stinnes had been on the Board of Directors of the Rheinisch-Westfälisches Elektrizitätswerk Aktiengesellschaft (RWE). He envisioned creating steam using the coal from his mines, to drive turbines for electricity production. As soon as Stinnes recognized RWE's potential he and steel magnate Fritz Thyssen bought shares to become the majority shareholder. The reason for RWE's rapid growth were the permits provided by the communities. However, since these concessions were time-limited, he chose to make the communities permanent shareholders, and gave each mayor a car.

=== During the First World War ===
Before World War I, he was a director for many of the largest industrial and mining companies of Westphalia, the Rhineland and Luxembourg. Business interests of this magnitude were constantly expanding, and he became interested in numerous subsidiary enterprises, such as tramways and the supply of electric power and light. He was also engaged in founding new companies or amalgamating existing ones. Stinnes managed to maintain an extensive and even a detailed knowledge of the working of all the companies in which he was engaged and, in all of them, to exact zealous and conscientious work from his business subordinates. The secret of his success was vertical integration and an essential unity of direction and coordination of aims in all branches of his enterprises.

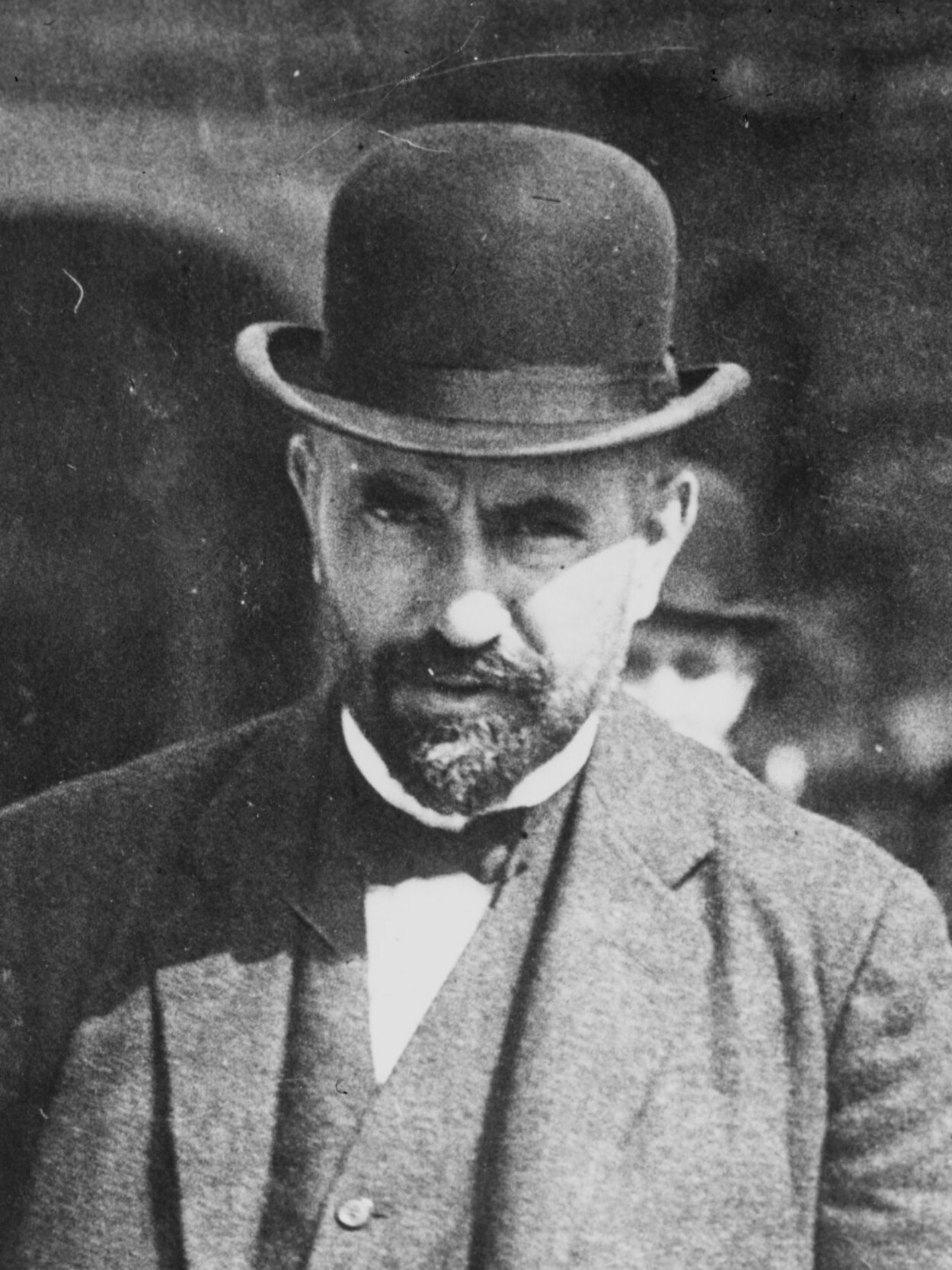
Hugo Stinnes between 1915 and 1920

When World War I broke out, Stinnes secured an enormous share in the war profits which enlarged the fortunes of the great industrialists. In enemy countries, his enterprises were sequestrated, and his firm at Rotterdam placed on the Allies' "black list". But, apart from the regular indemnification paid by the German government, he was richly compensated when he was called in by Erich Ludendorff, as the most competent expert to give advice, to organize the coal and the industrial production of occupied Belgium and to help to set in motion the gigantic production of war material which the German general headquarters demanded.

During the war, Stinnes extended his activities in Hamburg, and in 1916 he bought up the Woermann and the East African steamship lines. In these new undertakings, he became associated with the two greatest German shipping companies, the Hamburg-American Line and the North German Lloyd. His Hamburg interests continued to multiply in something like geometrical progression. He purchased half a dozen landed estates in Saxony to supply timber for pit props. At Flensburg in Schleswig, he secured control of the largest Baltic shipping concern, and proceeded to build a new fleet of ships, christening one of them the "Hindenburg".

=== Investment in right-wing politics ===
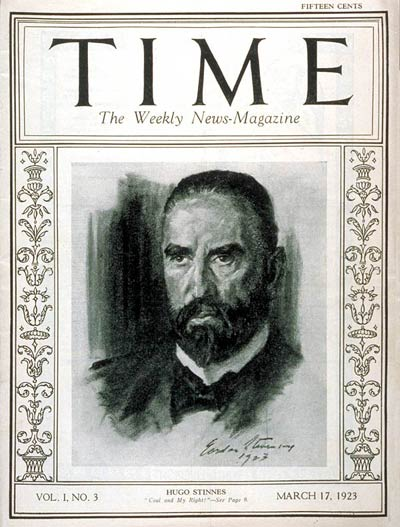
Time cover, 17 March 1923

Stinnes' connection with Ludendorff led to his becoming an influence behind the scenes in German politics. In 1918 he became a founding member of the Deutsche Volkspartei (German People's Party or DVP), the new electioneering name of the former National Liberal Party. On his initiative, on 10 January 1919, Stinnes conducted a meeting of top representatives of the German economy in revolutionary Berlin and funded Antibolschewistenfonds (Anti-Bolshevist Fund) of the Anti-Bolshevist League, which distributed anti-communist propaganda and financed right wing groups such as the Freikorps. Captain Waldemar Pabst, who was responsible for the murder of Rosa Luxemburg and Karl Liebknecht, is said to have been financed through one of his confidants. Already at the end of 1918 he had contributed around 4.4 million Reichsmarks to the financing of the Alfred Hugenberg media empire, which was supposed to carry nationalist propaganda to the population and which later became the nationwide propaganda machine for Adolf Hitler's NSDAP.

In June 1920, after the German Revolution, Stinnes was elected to the Reichstag. He acted as spokesman for German industry towards trade unions and laid the foundation of today's system of cooperation between the unions and employers in Germany. The introduction of the eight-hour day is a prime example of it.

Stinnes denounced the Kapp Putsch as a senseless adventure, but at the same time made friendly gestures towards Wolfgang Kapp personally. Substantial support was provided by Stinnes to the NSDAP. It is assumed that it was his donations to the Nazi party treasury that created the financial base of the Beer Hall Putsch.

About the time of his election to the Reichstag, Stinnes began to buy up leading German newspapers, one of his main objects being to organize a solid and powerful bloc of opinion in Germany in support of law and order and the promotion of the highest industrial and commercial efficiency. His newspaper purchases included the Deutsche Allgemeine Zeitung in Berlin, formerly the organ of Otto von Bismarck and then of all the succeeding German governments, the Münchener Neueste Nachrichten and the München-Augsburger Zeitung, the latter being one of the oldest newspapers in Germany. Both of the Munich journals were previously exponents of a very much more democratic trend of opinion than that which came to characterize them under his proprietorship. Ancillary to these acquisitions, Stinnes secured large interests in paper mills in order to make his newspapers independent of the paper market.

=== Later life ===
By the early 1920s, Stinnes was also using his influence in the press to attack the Versailles Treaty. Stinnes used his access to hard foreign currency during the period of inflation in the Weimar Republic to borrow vast sums in Reichsmark, repaying the loans with nearly worthless currency later. This earned him the title of "Inflationskönig" (Inflation King). In 1923, the American magazine Time called him "The New Emperor of Germany" to describe his far-reaching political influence and wealth.

In the 1920s, Stinnes was embroiled in a legal dispute with Mayer Wilderman. Wilderman, who had been born in Bessarabia (then part of Russia), had set up a series of factories in Germany in 1912. However, at the outbreak of World War I, Stinnes seized the factories and deprived Wilderman of his assets, using the excuse that Wilderman was an "enemy alien". In 1918, Bessarabia became part of Romania, and Wilderman attempted to recover his assets. However, Stinnes delayed the process by disputing the facts surrounding Wilderman's birth, such as accusing Wilderman of forging his birth certificate, and used financial sleight of hand to pretend the assets had in fact been dissipated and, therefore, there was nothing that could be restored.

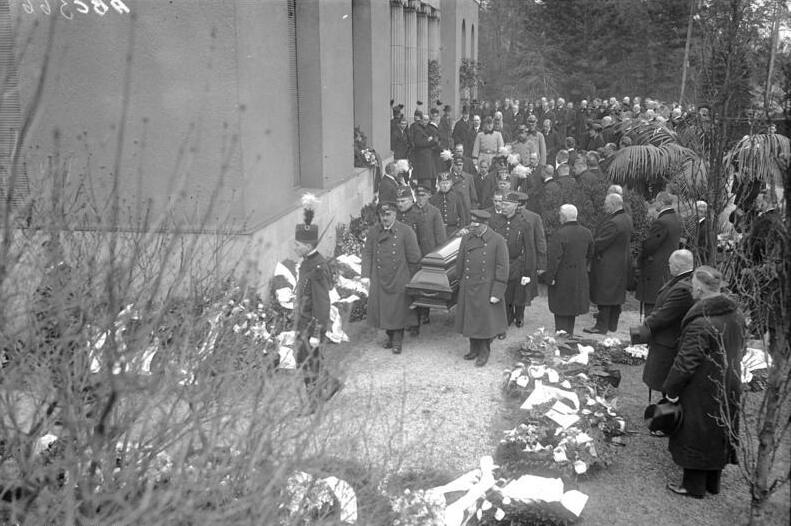
The coffin of Stinnes being carried during his funeral

Stinnes died in Berlin as a result of a gall bladder operation. Although his financial empire held some 4500 companies and 3000 manufacturing plants, it collapsed within a year of his death. Parts of his empire continued as Stinnes AG (now DB Mobility Logistics), Hugo Stinnes Schiffahrt and RWE, the second-largest energy supplier in Germany.

== Personal life ==
In 1895, Stinnes married Clara Eleonore Hermine Henriette Wagenknecht, colloquially Clara "Cläre" Wagenknecht (1872–1973), daughter of Edmund Karl Wagenknecht (1838–1921), a merchant and consul, and Clementina Wagenknecht (née von Eicken; 1848–1922). They had seven children;

- Edmund Hugo Stinnes (1896–1980), a financier who gave his home for Operation Sunrise in 1945, married firstly Emilie Margarete Herrmann (1899–1953), secondly Margiana von Schultze-Gaevernitz (1904–1989) with whom he had one daughter Veronica Stinnes Petersen (1933–2021), thirdly married to Bolivian-born Maria Emma Isabel Girardière (born 1906).
- Hugo Hermann Stinnes, colloquially Hermann Stinnes (1897–1982), married firstly to Tilda Will (born 1893), had one son, Dieter Hugo Stinnes (1920–2002), secondly to Birte Jensen (born 1913).
- Clara Eleonore Stinnes, colloquially Clärenore Stinnes (1901–1990), married Swedish-born photographer and filmmaker Carl-Axel Söderström, with whom she had daughter Cläre Söderström-Svensson (1931–2020).
- Otto Hugo Stinnes (1903–1983), married firstly Irene von Laffert (1920–1989), secondly to Hilde Bernau (1908–2000).
- Hildegard Kläre Stinnes (1904–1975), married firstly Max Georg Fiedler (1898–1977) with whom she had one son Hugo Max Fiedler (born 1928), secondly to Wilhelm Max Fiedler (1891–1964), with whom she had daughter Delia Fiedler (1933–2007).
- Ernst Hugo Stinnes (1911–1986), married Danish-born Anne Sophie Jensen (born 1912).
- Else Stinnes (1913–1997), never married.

Stinnes died 10 April 1924 aged 54 in Berlin, Weimar Republic.
