= Blandt Syd-Amerikas urskovsindianere =

1921 film

- Produced by: Gustav Lund
- Starring: Gustaf Bolinder
- Cinematography: Ottar Gladtvet
- Distributed by: Bio-Film Compagni
- Release date: December 26, 1921
- Running time: 88 minutes
- Country: Norway
- Language: Norwegian

Blandt Syd-Amerikas urskovsindianere (Note: The film's title is also spelled Blandt Syd-Amerikas Urskogsindianere and Blant Syd-Amerikas urskovsindianere.) (Among the Primeval Forest Indians of South America) is a Swedish–Norwegian documentary film about Gustaf Bolinder's ethnographic expedition to South America from 1920 to 1921. The film was shot by Ottar Gladtvet, who took part in the expedition, by agreement between Bolinder and the film's producer, Gustav Lund.

The film documents the expedition, whose purpose was to record the endangered Wayuu, Arhuaco, and Barí native cultures in Colombia and Venezuela.
