= Marthine Lund =

Norwegian photographer (c. 1817–1890)

Marthine Lund (c. 1817 – 15 October 1890) was an early Norwegian photographer from Drammen who headed the photographic studio Marthine Lund & Co., on Grændsegaden.

She shared the apartment and studio with the German photographer Anna Kreetz and her niece Octavia Sperati, an actress. The business ran from 1865 to around 1870.
