= Reidar Kaas =

Norwegian singer and actor (1881–1952)

- Born: July 27, 1881; Kristiania (now Oslo), Norway
- Died: May 18, 1952 (aged 70)
- Occupations: Singer; actor

Reidar Kaas (July 27, 1881 – May 18, 1952) was a Norwegian opera singer and actor.

== Career ==
Kaas was a baritone. He took singing lessons with Raimund von zur-Mühlen in London and the tenor Ernesto Colli (1866–1928) in Milan. Kaas performed at La Scala in Milan, the Carlo Felice Theater in Genoa, and opera houses in Poznań, Hamburg, London, and Oslo. Kaas also appeared in film roles. He made his debut in the silent film Paria in 1916 as Doctor Berner. In 1932, he played a Gypsy chief in the film Fantegutten, which was his last film role.

== Filmography ==
- 1916: Paria as Berner, a doctor
- 1932: Fantegutten as Parkas, a Gypsy chief

== Family ==
Kaas was born in Oslo, the son of the wholesaler Christian Oluf Andresen (1850–1890) and Aagot Theodosia Kaas (1854–1919). In 1906, he married Eli Tandberg (born March 12, 1885), the daughter of the landowner Gudbrand Tandberg and Caroline Kristine Cortsen. They had a son, Gudbrand Kaas.
