= Solveig Gladtvet =

Norwegian actress (1893–1951)

- Born: Solveig Ingrid Olsen; December 12, 1893; Kristiania (now Oslo), Norway
- Died: April 8, 1951 (aged 57)
- Occupation: Actress
- Spouse: Ottar Gladtvet

Solveig Ingerid Gladtvet (née Olsen, December 12, 1893 – August 4, 1951) was a Norwegian actress.

== Life and career ==
Solveig Gladtvet (Note: Solveig Ingerid Gladtvet should not be confused with Solveig Randine Gladtvet, born February 17, 1903, who was Ottar Gladtvet's sister.) was born in 1893 in Kristiania (now Oslo), Norway. She married the Norwegian filmmaker Ottar Gladtvet in 1914. She appeared in two silent films directed by her husband in the 1910s. She died in 1951.

== Filmography ==
- 1913: Overfaldet paa postaapnerens datter as Ingrid Munkevold, the postman's daughter
- 1918: Revolutionens datter as Claire Staalhammer, the daughter of the shipyard manager
