= Madam Høiers leiefolk =

"Madam Høiers leiefolk" (English: Madame Høier's Lodgers) is a short story by Norwegian writer Amalie Skram (then Amalie Müller). It was first published in 1882 in the magazine Nyt Tidsskrift, and was Skram's first published literary work. The story depicts a situation when a poor family is evicted from their flat. The two recent-born twins die during the night, and their mother is subsequently imprisoned for having caused the death of her children through negligence. The story caused significant stir, it was subject to parodies in satirical magazines, and lawyers pointing out judicial flaws.
