= Kitty Lossius =

Norwegian author

- Born: April 19, 1892; Åndalsnes, Norway
- Died: November 26, 1981 (aged 89); Oslo, Norway
- Occupation: Author
- Spouse: Robert Sperati

Kitty Lossius (April 19, 1892 – November 26, 1981) was a Norwegian teacher and novelist. She had a publishing career that lasted nearly fifty years.

== Life and work ==
Lossius grew up in Kristiansund, where she graduated from high school in 1908. She graduated as a teacher from Levanger Normal School in 1914, and she took a four-month course at the State Gymnastics School in 1917.

She debuted with the novel Ranka Paus (1919), and later she wrote the play Grobund (1920) and ten more novels and two books for young girls.

Her books are described as "stamped with the character of Kristiansund." Her debut novel is about a priest's wife that is an author and experiences her opinions colliding with the role of a priest's wife. The play Grobund is about contrasts between the bourgeoisie and the working class. Her books are referred to both as entertaining literature and as psychologically realistic novels from a bourgeois environment. The novel Enken og jomfruen (The Widow and the Maiden, 1954) is based on actual events; her grandfather's love story with an elderly widow.

== Family ==
Lossius's grandfather Caspar Kahrs Lossius (1799–1868) was a farmer and the mayor of Aure Municipality, and her father Caspar Kahrs Lossius (1844–1906) was a ship's captain and hotel owner. After her father's death, Lossius's mother Christine Magdalene (née Eberg) took over running the hotel, and Lossius worked for a time in a bookstore. She worked as a teacher in Kristiansund from 1915 to 1932, when she quit due to illness. In 1934 she was living in Oslo. She was married to the actor Robert Sperati.

== Bibliography ==
- 1919: Ranka Paus (Kristiania: Helge Erichsen)
- 1920: Grobund (Kristiania: Helge Erichsen)
- 1921: Pensionærer (Kristiania: Aschehoug)
- 1922: Boggis & Co. – fortelling for unge piker (Kristiania: Aschehoug)
- 1924: Lykken (Kristiania: Aschehoug)
- 1925: Frøken Snobb og hjerterdame (Oslo: Aschehoug)
- 1946: Familien Testmann (Oslo: Aschehoug)
- 1947: Helene Lange gjør statur opp (Oslo: Aschehoug)
- 1951: Rød måne (Oslo: Aschehoug)
- 1954: Enken og jomfruen (Oslo: Aschehoug)
- 1963: Christoffers ring (Oslo: Aschehoug)
- 1964: Bare rett over gaten (Oslo: Aschehoug)
- 1966: Måne i ne – variasjoner over et tema (Oslo: Aschehoug)
