= Bondefangeri i Vaterland =

1911 film

- Directed by: Pehr Qværnstrøm
- Written by: Pehr Qværnstrøm
- Starring: Signe Danning; Hans Ingi Hedemark; Emmy Worm-Müller
- Cinematography: Henrik Jaenzon
- Distributed by: Internationalt Filmskompani
- Release date: November 11, 1911
- Country: Norway
- Language: Norwegian

Bondefangeri i Vaterland (Con Job in Vaterland) is a Norwegian silent film from 1911 that is considered lost. The film portrayed prostitutes and beggars in Oslo's Vaterland neighborhood. The film premiered at the Kosmorama Theater in Kristiania (now Oslo) on November 11, 1911.

== Cast ==
- Pehr Qværnstrøm as the farmer
- Signe Danning as the White Rose
- Hans Ingi Hedemark as Ola Snippen
- Christian Nobel as Kal' Røver'n
- Mathea Tønder as the farmer's wife
- Emmy Worm-Müller as Agurka
