= Signe Danning =

Norwegian actress (1878–1980)

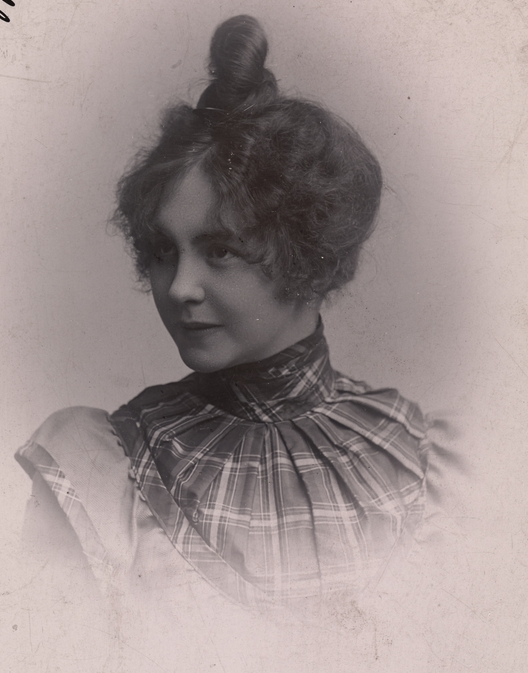
- Born: August 25, 1878; Kristiania (now Oslo), Norway
- Died: February 10, 1980 (aged 101); Odense, Denmark
- Occupation: Actress
- Spouse: Christian Danning

Signe Thora Aas Danning (August 25, 1878 – February 10, 1980) was a Norwegian actress from the silent film era.

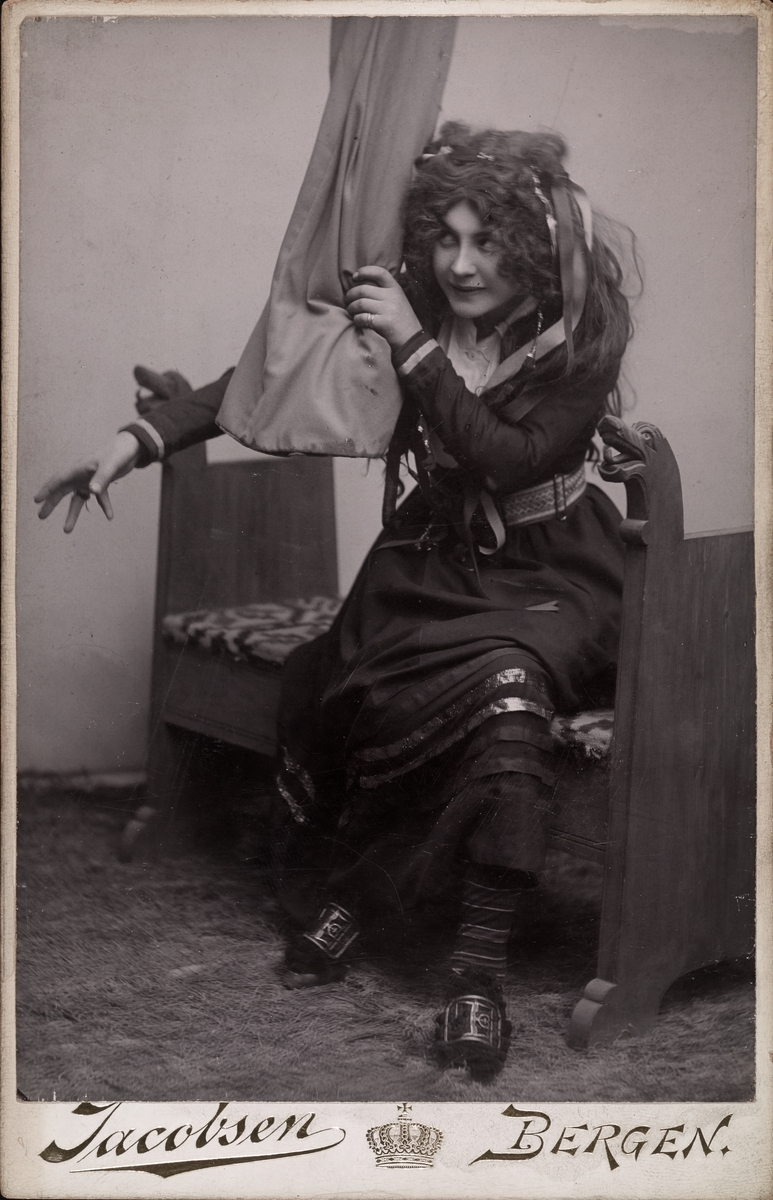
Danning performing a theater role, circa 1900

Danning was born in Kristiania (now Oslo). She was engaged with the National Stage in Bergen from 1897 to 1906, and it was there that she met the Danish composer Christian Danning. They married in 1902 and moved to Kristiania in 1906, where she played at the Fahlstrøm Theater and at a theater in Oslo's Tivoli amusement park. After four silent films, they relocated to Odense, Denmark in 1914. Following her husband's early death in 1925, she lived at the Grayfriars Monastery retirement home in Odense.

== Filmography ==
- 1911: Bondefangeri i Vaterland as the White Rose
- 1911: Fattigdommens forbandelse
- 1911: Under forvandlingens lov as Camillo's wife Julia
- 1912: Hemmeligheden as Elise Halling
