= Lulli Sperati =

Norwegian actress (1873–1946)

- Born: May 13, 1873; Christiania (now Oslo), Norway
- Died: October 10, 1946 (aged 73); Oslo, Norway
- Occupation: Actress
- Parents: Robert F. A. Sperati (father); Octavia Sperati (mother)
- Relatives: Robert Sperati, Carlo Alberto Sperati

Alvilde "Lulli" Sperati (May 13, 1873 – October 10, 1946) was a Norwegian actress and singer.

== Family ==
Lulli Sperati was the daughter of the conductor Robert Ferdinand Arnold Sperati (1848–1884) and the actress Octavia Sperati (1847–1918). She was the granddaughter of the conductor and composer Paolo Sperati (1821–1884), and the sister of the film actor Robert Sperati (1872–1945). She married Richard Jordan, a sales representative, at St John's Church in Bergen on June 20, 1902. She was the niece of the composer and music professor Carlo Alberto Sperati.

== Life and work ==
Lulli Sperati debuted at the National Theater in Bergen on March 18, 1891, in the role of Sigrid in Til Sæters (To the Mountain Pastures). She was engaged with this theater until 1896.

From 1896 to 1898, Sperati performed as a singer at Eldorado in Kristiania (now Oslo). During the same period, she also spent time abroad to study further, including with the Danish singer Sextus Miskow starting in the fall of 1896. During this time she also performed at various venues around Norway, sometimes appearing with her mother.

Sperati performed again at the National Theater in Bergen from 1898 to 1905. She appeared there in the fall of 1903 the opera Kynthia by Christian Danning and Hans Wiers-Jenssen. She had a good singing voice and considerabče talent, and she appeared in many different roles, from spoken pieces to operas.

In 1905, she gave up her life on stage for health reasons. As late as 1915, however, she made appearances with her mother.

== Selected roles ==
- Sigrid in Til Sæters by Claus Pavels Riis (National Theater, Bergen, 1891)
- Lene in Die Haubenlerche (Norwegian title: Lærken) by Ernst von Wildenbruch (National Theater, Bergen, 1891)
- Lisbeth in the vaudeville En Søndag paa Amager by Johanne Luise Heiberg (National Theater, Bergen)
- Paula in Cornelius Voss (Norwegian title: Prins Papillon) by Franz von Schönthan (National Theater, Bergen, 1895)
- Emilie in the vaudeville monologue Emilies Hjertebanken by Johan Ludvig Heiberg (Kristiansund, 1896)
- Fiorella in the operetta Les brigands (Norwegian title: Røverne) by Jacques Offenbach (National Theater, Bergen, 1899)
- Madame Sanderus in The Political Tinker by Ludvig Holberg (National Theater, Bergen, 1899)
- Gustav in Livets Spil by Knut Hamsun (National Theater, Bergen, 1899)
- Maria in Fandens Overmand based on a work by Thomas Overskou (National Theater, Bergen, 1900)
- Mimi in La bohème by Giacomo Puccini (National Theater, Bergen, 1902)
- Anitra in Peer Gynt by Henrik Ibsen (National Theater, Bergen, 1904)
- Pernille in The Fidget by Ludvig Holberg (National Theater, Bergen, 1905)
