= Gero von Schulze-Gaevernitz =

German economist

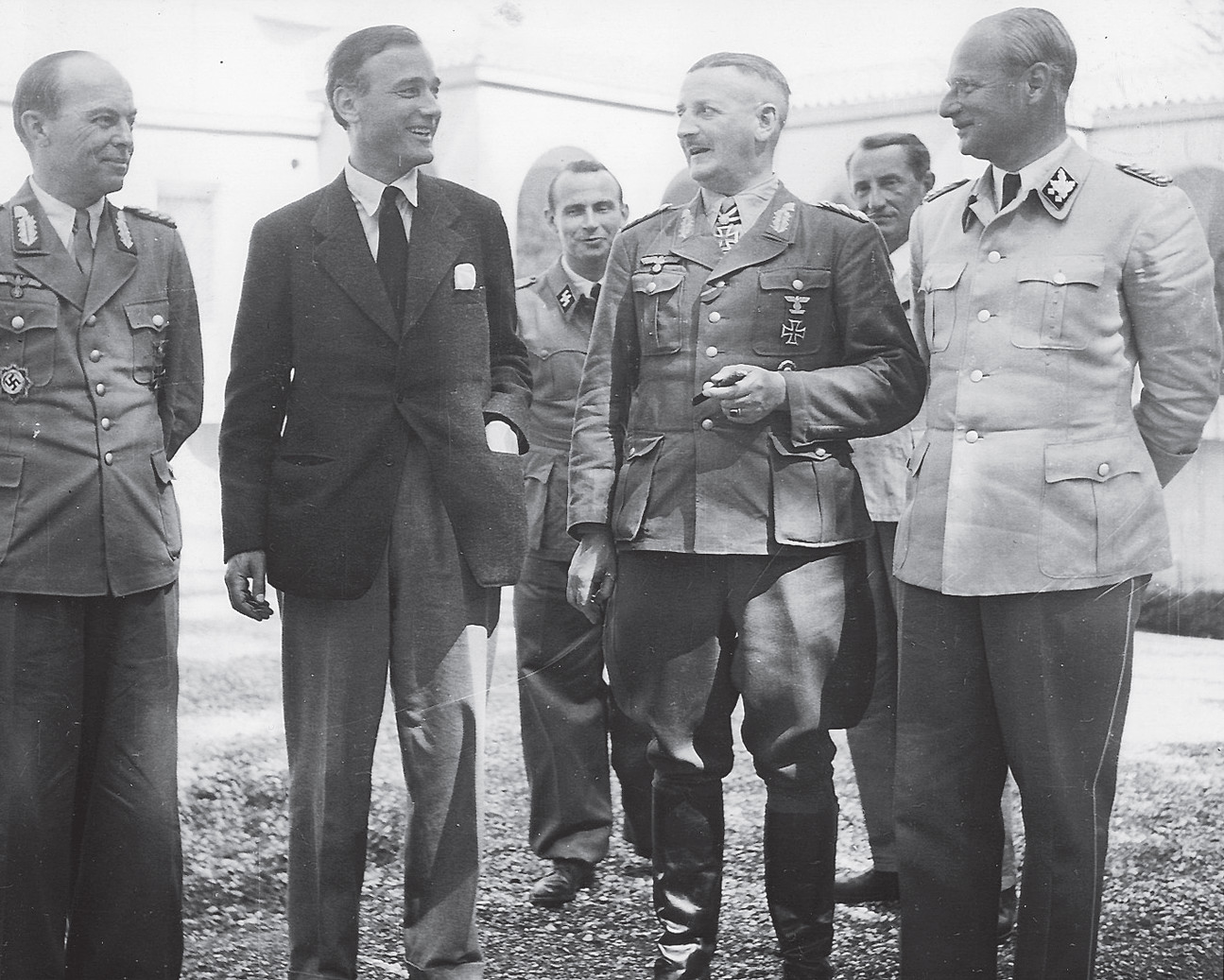
Schulze-Gaevernitz (in suit) visits German headquarters in Bolzano on 12 May 1945

Gero von Schulze-Gaevernitz (27 September 1901 in Freiburg, Germany – 6 April 1970 in Canary Islands) was a German economist. He became a crucial assistant of Allen Dulles in Europe and was awarded the US Medal of Freedom in 1945 for his skillful negotiations in Ascona, Switzerland, for the surrender of a million Nazi forces in World War II, with specific reference to Italy (Operation Sunrise).

== Family ==
Schulze-Gaevernitz was the son of Gerhart von Schulze-Gävernitz, professor of political science at Freiburg University and a member of the Weimar parliament (25 July 1865 in Breslau, Silesia – 10 July 1943 in Krainsdorf, Silesia). His mother was Johanna Hirsch, (23 May 1876 in Mannheim, Germany – 1938 in Ascona, Switzerland). He had two sisters: Ruth Gaevernitz, a historian; and Margiana von Schulze-Gävernitz, who married entrepreneur and philanthropist Edmund Stinnes.
