= Agnete (play) =

Norwegian play

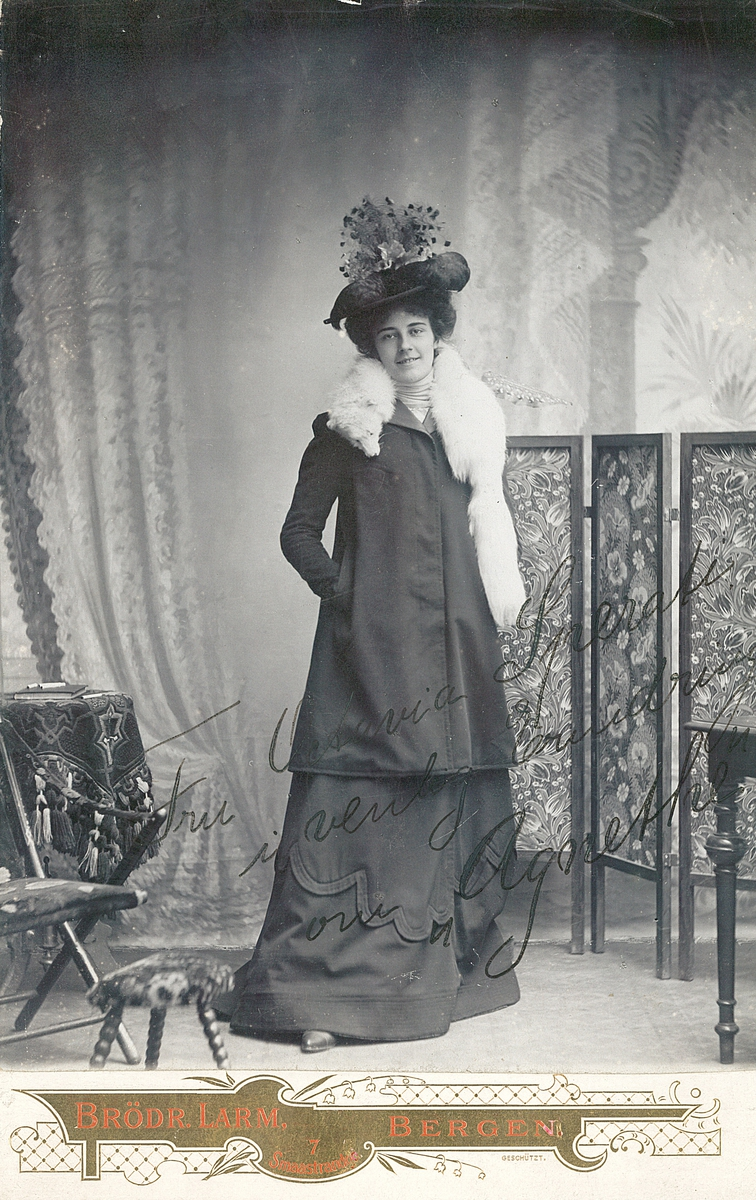
Magda Blanc in the title role in Amalie Skram's play Agnete, photographed by the Larm Brothers in 1901

Agnete is a play by the Norwegian writer Amalie Skram, published in 1893.

The play is reminiscent of Henrik Ibsen's A Doll's House in several respects. The main character is Agnete Lindemann, who has been described as "perhaps the most sympathetic of Amalie Skram's female characters." She has a mixed past: she comes from a good family, is beautiful, and is divorced from a man who later went bankrupt and therefore could not make a living. To survive, she steals, pilfering from friends, arranging fake collection drives, and the like. She falls in love with Rikard Berg, the lawyer who handled her divorce case.

She wants to live a "true life" toward him, and she confesses her dishonesty in the past. He fails to accept this, and can no longer marry her. She is unhappy and dejected, and says she will "travel to my cousin in Nordfjord to become his housekeeper."

Edvard Beyer wrote that "The play does not excel in having great originality. It is also a bit awkward in its technical aspects. But Agnete is a living little person, drawn with tenderness and warmth. Her dream of love and quiet woman's fate is gripping."
