= Pehr Qværnstrøm =

Norwegian actor

- Born: February 8, 1878; Halden, Norway
- Died: December 12, 1949 (aged 71)
- Occupation: Actor
- Parents: Martin Qværnstrøm (father); Clara Gustava Qværnstrøm (née Hollander) (mother)

Pehr Adolf Qværnstrøm (February 8, 1878 – December 12, 1949) was a Norwegian actor, film director, and scriptwriter.

== Filmography ==
=== As an actor ===
- 1911: Bondefangeri i Vaterland as the farmer
- 1911: Fattigdommens forbandelse
- 1912: Hemmeligheden as the fisherman
- 1920: Kaksen på Øverland as Aasmund Venaas, a musician
- 1937: Bra mennesker as a merchant
- 1938: Det drønner gjennom dalen as a forest owner
- 1938: Lenkene brytes as Ludvigsen
- 1938: Ungen as a restaurateur
- 1939: Familien på Borgan as Ola Bråten
- 1939: Gryr i Norden as the chairman
- 1940: Godvakker-Maren as the merchant Nils Endresen
- 1943: Vigdis as a court witness
- 1946: Så møtes vi imorgen as the office manager

=== As director ===
- 1911: Bondefangeri i Vaterland

=== As scriptwriter ===
- 1911: Bondefangeri i Vaterland
