= Tharald Høyerup Blanc =

Norwegian historian

Tharald Høyerup Blanc (December 6, 1838 – April 18, 1921) was a Norwegian theatre historian.

He was born in Bergen. In addition to being a theatre critic in several newspapers and periodicals, he wrote several books which even today are marked by objectivity. His most important books are Norges første nationale scene (1884), Christiania Theaters historie 1827–77 (1899) and Henrik Ibsen og Christiania Theater 1850–99 (1906).
