= En vinternat =

- Directed by: Oscar Gustafson; Peter Lykke-Seest
- Written by: Peter Lykke-Seest
- Starring: Oscar Gustafson; Helen Storm; Moltke Garmann; Thurid Hetland
- Release date: 28 July 1917
- Running time: 79 minutes
- Country: Norway
- Language: Norwegian

En vinternat (English: A winter night) is a 1917 Norwegian crime film written by Peter Lykke-Seest, and directed by Lykke-Seest and Oscar Gustafson, starring Oscar Gustafson, Helen Storm, Moltke Garmann, and Thurid Hetland. Wollert Berg (Gustafson) is an author who has retired to his cabin in the woods to write. He offers lodging to a couple of vagrants, but when they steal from the neighbours, Wollert gets accused and convicted. His wife (Storm) then enlists the help of a detective to clear his name.

The film is considered lost.
