= Paolo Sperati =

Italian conductor and composer

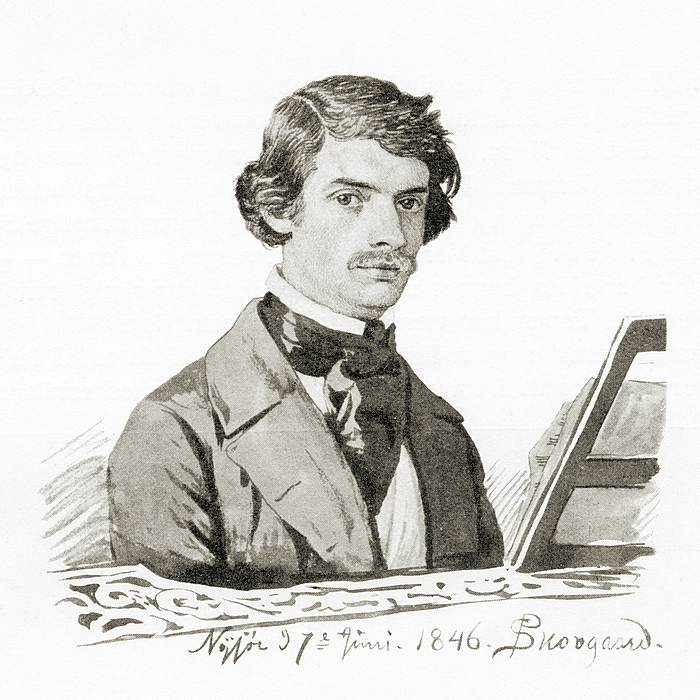
- Born: March 26, 1821; Turin, Kingdom of Sardinia
- Died: May 20, 1884 (aged 63); Christiania (now Oslo), Norway
- Resting place: Cemetery of Our Saviour
- Occupations: Conductor and composer
- Children: Robert F. A. Sperati
- Relatives: Robert Sperati, Lulli Sperati

Paolo Agostino Sperati (March 26, 1821 – May 20, 1884) was an Italian conductor, musician, and composer that was active in the theater and opera life of Christiania (now Oslo), Norway in the 19th century.

== Life and work ==
Sperati grew up in a family of musicians, and he made his debut as an organist at the age of nine in 1830. He became a military musician in Genoa in 1834, and from there moved to Nice, where he accompanied Paganini. He led a traveling ensemble in 1838 and 1839 that visited Marseille, where he met the conductor Pietro Negri, who engaged him in the opera in Berlin and then in Copenhagen (1841–1850) as conductor of the Italian Society (Det italienske selskab) at the Court Theater and the Royal Danish Theatre. They performed Danish premieres of works by Giuseppe Verdi and were commissioned by Christian VIII.

He then led the Italian opera troupe that brought the impresario Vincenzo Galli (1798–1858) to Norway in 1849, after he had spent a year at the Royal Swedish Opera. In Norway, Sperati was engaged as a conductor for the Christiania Theater (1850–1866) and the Kristiania Norwegian Theater (1852–1862). He conducted the Oslo Craftsmen's Choir (Oslo Håndverker Sangforening, 1854–1857) and the Freemason Choir (Frimurernes Sangforening, 1883–1884), and he was an organist at the newly consecrated St. Olav's Cathedral (1856–1884).

Sperati became perhaps best known as the conductor of the 2nd Brigade Military Band (1854–1882), and in 1862 he was made a captain, in which capacity he enlisted the young Johan Halvorsen in 1881. Sperati worked at the Christiania People's Theater and the newly started Tivoli Opera (1882) until his death from a stroke on Easter Sunday, 1884. Sperati was friends with Henrik Ibsen and composed music for his play The Feast at Solhaug (1856). He also composed Skandinavisk Quadrille (Scandinavian Quadrille), a potpourri of six popular pieces.

In Italy he is still known today above all for his organ adaptations of works by Giuseppe Verdi, in particular a series of pieces for the mass taken from the operas Aida, Don Carlo, Rigoletto, Trovatore, Macbeth, Giovanna d'Arco, Un ballo in maschera, Attila, Ernani, and Giovanna di Guzman.

His original production of organ music is less known, including the series Tre Pastorali published by Vismara in Milan in Collection of Pieces for the Modern Organist by Renowned Authors / Transcribed and Varied by Paolo Sperati.

== Family ==
Sperati married a Danish woman, Sidsel Marie Nielsen (1823–1864), in 1847. While living in Copenhagen, they had two sons: Robert Ferdinand Arnold (1847–1884), who became a conductor and was later married to the actress Octavia Sperati, and Emmanuel (born 1850). After moving to Christiania, they had four more children: Wittorio (born 1853), who became a musician; Anna Giacinta (born 1856); Angelina Sicilia (born 1858), who became a teacher; and Carlo Alberto Sperati (1860–1943), who became a music professor.

After the death of his first wife, Paolo Sperati married his Danish housekeeper, Charlotte Mathilde Bendixen (1835–1906), in 1872. Together they had a son, Paolo Angelo Johannes (born 1869), who became a violinist.
