= Clärenore Stinnes =

German racing driver

- Stinnes in 1930
- Born: Clara Eleonore Stinnes; 21 January 1901; Mülheim an der Ruhr, Rhine Province, German Empire
- Died: 7 September 1990 (aged 89); Katrineholm, Södermanland County, Sweden
- Occupation: Auto racer
- Spouse: Carl-Axel Söderström (m. 1930)
- Children: 3

Clara Eleonore "Clärenore" Stinnes-Söderstrom (née Stinnes; 21 January 1901 – 7 September 1990) was a German female auto racer, heiress and socialite. Together with Swedish cinematographer Carl-Axel Söderström, the two were the first to circumnavigate the world by automobile.

== Early life and education ==
Stinnes was born in Mülheim to the German industrialist and politician Hugo Stinnes. At the age of 24 she participated in her first motor race; by 1927 she had won 17 races and was one of the most successful race car drivers in Europe. On 25 May 1927 Stinnes started to journey around the world, together with Carl-Axel Söderström, whom she had met only two days before her departure, in a mass production Adler Standard 6 automobile and escorted by two mechanics and a freight vehicle with spare parts and equipment. The journey was sponsored by the German automotive industry (Adler, Bosch and Aral) with 100,000 Reichsmark.

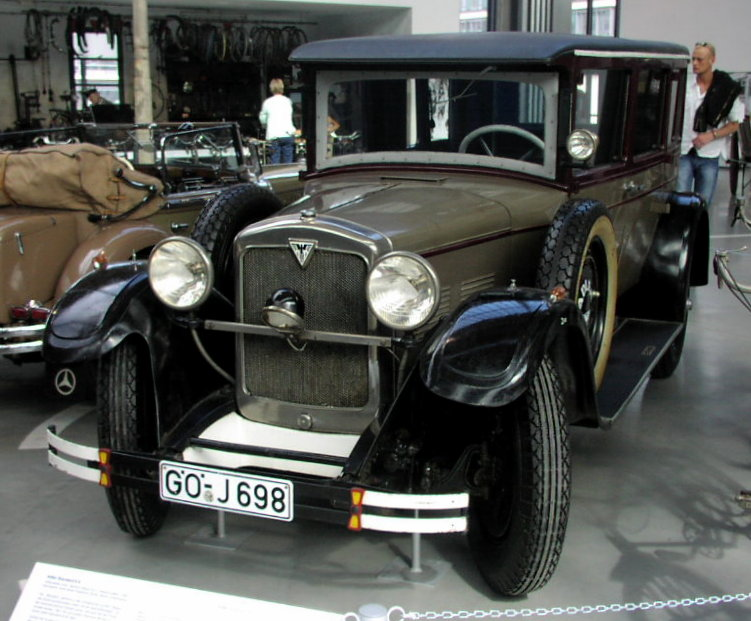
An Adler Standard 6, the model which Stinnes drove on her journey.

They passed through the Balkans via Beirut, Damascus, Baghdad and Tehran to Moscow, where the two mechanics left, then they travelled to Siberia, crossed the frozen Lake Baikal and the Gobi desert and came to Peking. They travelled by ferry to Japan, later to Hawaii and South America. Arriving in Lima they travelled across the Andes Mountains to Buenos Aires, then back again and north through Central America. The pair continued on to Vancouver and New York. In Washington, D.C. Stinnes and Söderström were welcomed by President Herbert Hoover. They travelled by ferry to Le Havre and arrived with their car in Berlin on 24 June 1929, after a journey of 47,000 km (29,000 mi) by car.

== Personal life ==
After their happy return Carl-Axel Söderström was divorced; Söderström and Stinnes married and lived on an estate in Sweden, where they raised three children of their own and several foster children. In later years they spent some time of the year in Irmenach. Söderström died in 1976, aged 82, while Stinnes survived her husband by 14 years.

== Other sources ==
- Stinnes, Clärenore: Im Auto durch zwei Welten: Die erste Autofahrt einer Frau um die Welt, 1927 bis 1929, Promedia Verlag 1996, ISBN 978-38-5371-105-7
- Stinnes C. (1927–1929). En auto a través de los continentes. Madrid. Ediciones Casiopea. 2016. ISBN 978-84-608704-8-7 (papel) ISBN 978-84-946727-3-6 (digital). Spanish edit.
- Tejera, P. (2018). Reinas de la carretera. Madrid. Ediciones Casiopea. ISBN 978-84-948482-1-6 (papel) / ISBN 978-84-948482-2-3 (digital). Spanish edit.
