= Carlo Alberto Sperati =

Norwegian-American composer and music professor

- Born: December 29, 1860; Kristiania (now Oslo), Norway
- Died: September 12, 1945 (aged 84); Decorah, Iowa
- Resting place: Lutheran Cemetery, Decorah, Iowa
- Occupations: Composer, music professor
- Father: Paolo Sperati
- Relatives: Robert Sperati, Lulli Sperati

Carlo Alberto Sperati (December 29, 1860 – September 12, 1945) was a Norwegian-American composer and music professor.

Sperati was born in Kristiania (now Oslo), Norway, the fourth son (eighth child) of the conductor Paolo Sperati and Marie Nielsen Sperati. He went to sea in 1877, and then enrolled in theological studies at Luther College in Decorah, Iowa in 1884. He graduated in 1888. He married Emma Hoffoss in 1891 and became a priest in the Lutheran church that same year. He became a teacher in Tacoma, Washington in 1894, and he also worked at Pacific Lutheran University, where, among other events, he conducted a band that played on Mount Rainier.

Sperati is best known for his work at Luther College, where he was a professor of music from 1905 to 1943. He conducted the Luther College Concert Band on tours in Europe and the United States.

== Legacy ==
Sperati Point in North Dakota was named after Carlo Sperati in honor of a visit by the Luther College Band in 1927.

Luther College's Carlo A. Sperati Award is named after Sperati.
