= Gerhart von Schulze-Gävernitz =

German economist (1864–1943)

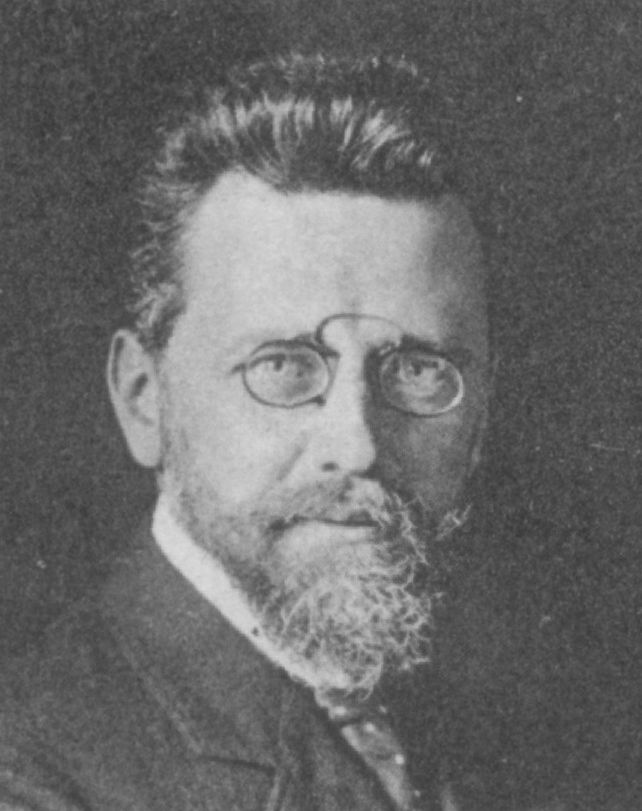
Gerhart von Schulze-Gävernitz in 1912.

Gerhart von Schulze-Gävernitz (born 25 July 1864 in Breslau; died 10 July 1943 in Krainsdorf) was a German economist.

== Biography ==
He became professor at Freiburg in 1893, and at Heidelberg in 1896, and then returned to Freiburg. After his retirement, he became a Quaker.

== Works ==
- Zum sozialen Frieden (Toward a peaceful society; 1890)
- Grossbetrieb (Large operations; 1892)
- Thomas Carlyles Welt- und Lebensanschauung (Thomas Carlyles view of life and the world; 1893)
- Volkswirtschaftliche Studien aus Russland (Political economic studies from Russia; 1899)
- Britischer Iperialismus und englischer Freihandel zu Beginn des 20-ten Jahrhunderis(British Imperialism and English Free Market at the beginnings of 20th century;1906)
- Democracy and religion. A Study in Quakerism (1931)

== Family ==
His son, Gero von Schulze-Gaevernitz, was also an economist.
