= Under forvandlingens lov =

1911 film

- Directed by: Halfdan Nobel Roede
- Written by: Peter Lykke-Seest
- Starring: Olaf Hanson; Ingeborg Hauge; Birger Widt; Signe Danning; Hans Ingi Hedemark; Bertha Ræstad; Botten Soot; Hedvig Dietrichson; Christian Danning
- Cinematography: Henrik Jaenzon
- Distributed by: Internationalt Filmskompani
- Release date: December 4, 1911
- Running time: 26 minutes
- Country: Norway
- Language: Norwegian

Under forvandlingens lov (Under the Law of Change) or Jo tykkere, jo bedre (The Thicker, the Better) is a Norwegian silent film from 1911. It is the oldest known surviving Norwegian film, and it was directed by Halfdan Nobel Roede. The film has been characterized as an erotic melodrama, and it premiered in Kristiania (now Oslo) on December 4, 1911. The script for the film was written by Peter Lykke-Seest under the pseudonym Søløvenskjold Pedersen.

In 1992, Gunnar Iversen claimed that Roede's lost 1912 silent film I frihetens bur (In the Cage of Freedom) is actually the same film as Under forvandlingens lov.

== Plot ==
Under forvandlingens lov (1911)

The film is a jealousy drama in which Camillo and Francisca discover that their spouses Julia and Arthur are having an affair with each other. They drug the unfaithful spouses and lock them in separate cages until they get tired of each other, and the spouses find each other again and become happy. The film's plot includes a visit to an outdoor variety show. Four songs from the variety show are incorporated into the film. The opera singer Hans Ingi Hedemark performs there, Bertha Ræstad dances a cake-walk, Botten Soot dances an Egyptian dance, and Hedvig Dietrichson dances the "Dance of Chopin."

== Cast ==
- Birger Widt as Camillo
- Olaf Hansson as his friend Arthur
- Signe Danning as Camillo's wife Julia
- Ingeborg Hauge as Arthur's wife Franziska
- Hans Ingi Hedemark as a singer
- Bertha Ræstad as a dancer
- Botten Soot as a dancer
- Hedvig Dietrichson as a dancer
- Christian Danning
