= Octavia Sperati (actress) =

Norwegian actress (1847–1918)

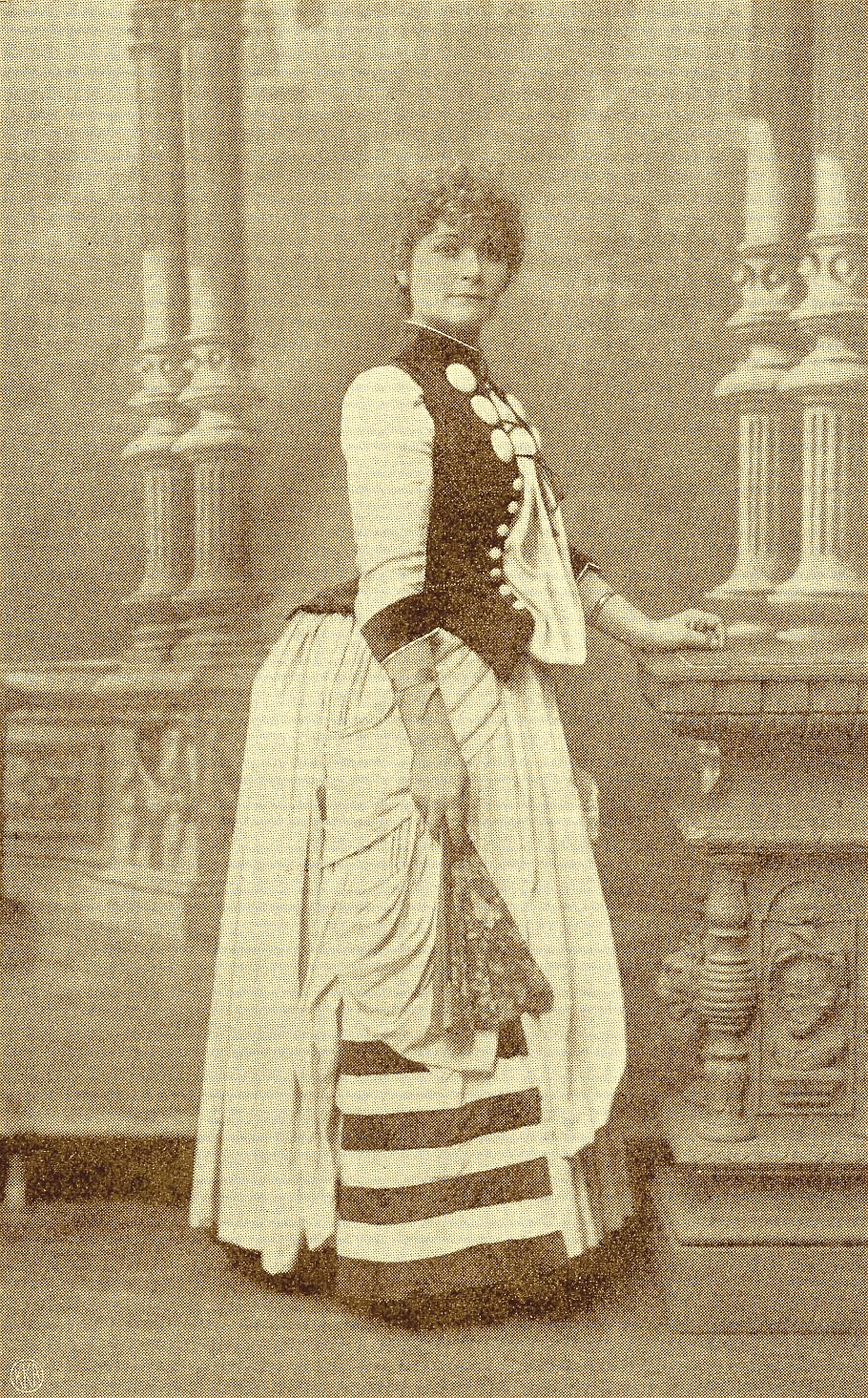
- Born: February 19, 1847; Kristiansand, Norway
- Died: March 22, 1918 (aged 71); Bergen, Norway
- Occupation: Actress
- Spouse: Robert F. A. Sperati
- Children: Robert Sperati, Lulli Sperati

Octavia Salmine Sperati (née Svendsen, February 19, 1847 – March 22, 1918) was a Norwegian actress.

Sperati made her debut in 1865 at the Central Theater in the play Les vieux péchés (Norwegian title: Gamle Minder) by Mélesville and Dumanoir, at the same time as she lived and worked in her Aunt Marthine Lund's photo studio. Later she was associated for a time with the Christiania Norwegian Theater. She went from there to the National Theater in Bergen, when it opened in 1876. This took place in the Comedy House at Engen, where Ole Bull's Norwegian Theater operated from 1850 to 1863. It was later rented out to traveling theater troupes.

Sperati won recognition for her roles in plays by Ludvig Holberg and for her interpretations of Henrik Ibsen's characters, especially her portrayal of Gina Ekdal at the world premiere of The Wild Duck on January 9, 1885. In 1901 and 1902 she played the role of Lona Hessel in The Pillars of Society.

== Family ==
Sperati was married to the conductor Robert Ferdinand Arnold Sperati (1848–1884), who was the son of the conductor and composer Paolo Sperati (1821–1884). Her son Robert Sperati (1872–1945) was an actor and appeared in silent films. Her daughter Alvilde "Lulli" Sperati (1873–1946) was an actress and opera singer with the National Theater in Bergen.

== Trivia ==
In connection with the first performances of The Wild Duck at the National Theater in Bergen in 1885, Sperati believed that it was her experience from photography work in her Aunt Marthine Lund's studio in Kristiania that enabled her to play the role of Gina Ekdal so naturally:

Hvad der bidrog til at hjælpe mig utover al mystik og ind i virkeligheten og bidrog til at jeg helt indforlivedes med og utformet min rolle i dens mange detaljer, var den omstændighet, at Gina Ekdal er saa rikelig velsignet med arbeide - alle mulige slags gjøremaal. Hun sliter og stræver ustanselig fra morgen til kveld for at skaffe mat og øl, hun fotograferer og lapper, lægger i ovnen hos den «logerende», lager sildesalat og lærer sig til at forsage og spare for sig selv.

What helped me beyond all mystery and into reality and helped me fully empathize with and shape my role in its many details was that Gina Ekdal is so richly blessed with work—all sorts of chores. She struggles and strives incessantly from dawn to dusk to provide food and beer, she takes photos and patches clothes, tends the stove at the "lodger's," makes herring salad, and learns to relinquish and save for herself.

— Octavia Sperati, Fra det gamle komediehus (1916), p. 106

Sperati's portrait was the only one that survived intact after the fire at the National Theater in Bergen in 1983, an incident that was ascribed a paranormal explanation when Jørgen Fogge, the first to arrive at the scene, claimed to have heard her voice in the middle of the sea of flames.
