= Jacob Worm-Müller (writer) =

Norwegian author and journalist

- Born: May 15, 1866; Bergen, Norway
- Died: May 6, 1911 (aged 44)
- Occupations: Author, journalist
- Notable work: Fire dage; Stormen
- Spouse: Emmy Helene Hornemann
- Parent: Amalie, née Alver (later Amalie Skram) (mother)

Jacob Worm-Müller (15 May 1866 – 6 May 1911) was a Norwegian author and journalist.

He was born in Bergen as a son of ship-owner Bernt Ulrich August Müller and Amalie, née Alver. His mother later remarried as Amalie Skram and became one of Norway's best-known authors. After Jacob Worm-Müller finished his secondary education in 1884, he studied law, but mixed socially with the Kristiania Bohemians and was subsequently sent by his mother to Copenhagen. He returned to Norway in 1894. He married Emmy Helene Hornemann, who became an actress.

Jacob Worm-Müller issued the novels Fire dage ("Four Days", 1894) and Stormen ("The Tempest", 1895), both on the publishing house Gyldendal. As a journalist he wrote for several newspapers, often espousing a zealous attitude, for instance in his support of the Boers in the Boer War. Late in his life he converted to Roman Catholicism. Despite working several years in Dagbladet, this newspaper's obituary noted that Worm-Müller had become "reactionary", in "both social as well as religious" aspects. The last newspaper Worm-Müller wrote for was Ørebladet. He died following surgery at the age of 45.
