= Hemmeligheden =

1912 film

- Directed by: Halfdan Nobel Roede
- Starring: Signe Danning; Robert Sperati; Christian Nobel; Pehr Qværnstrøm; Emmy Worm-Müller
- Distributed by: Internationalt Films-Kompani AS
- Release date: March 16, 1912
- Country: Norway
- Language: Norwegian

Hemmeligheden (The Secret) is a Norwegian silent film from 1912 that is considered lost.

== Plot ==
The film was a drama in which a young woman from a coastal town gets to know an artist from Paris. They start a relationship and she has a daughter. The young woman, Elise, leaves and, on the steamship home to Norway, she throws the child overboard. When she returns home, she marries Lieutenant Almeng. It turns out that the child she threw overboard did not die, but was found by a fishing couple, who have adopted the child. One day, Elise and the lieutenant meet the fisherman, and Elise breaks down and tells her husband the story of what happened. The lieutenant first takes the matter very sternly, but when he sees how unhappy this has made Elise, he goes to the fisherman and retrieves his wife's daughter, and he promises to treat her as though she were his own child.

== Cast ==
- Christian Nobel as Lieutenant Almeng
- Signe Danning as Elsie Halling
- Pehr Qværnstrøm as a fisherman
- Robert Sperati as Halling the landowner
- Emmy Worm-Müller as the fisherman's wife
