= Amalie Skram =

Norwegian author and feminist (1846–1905)

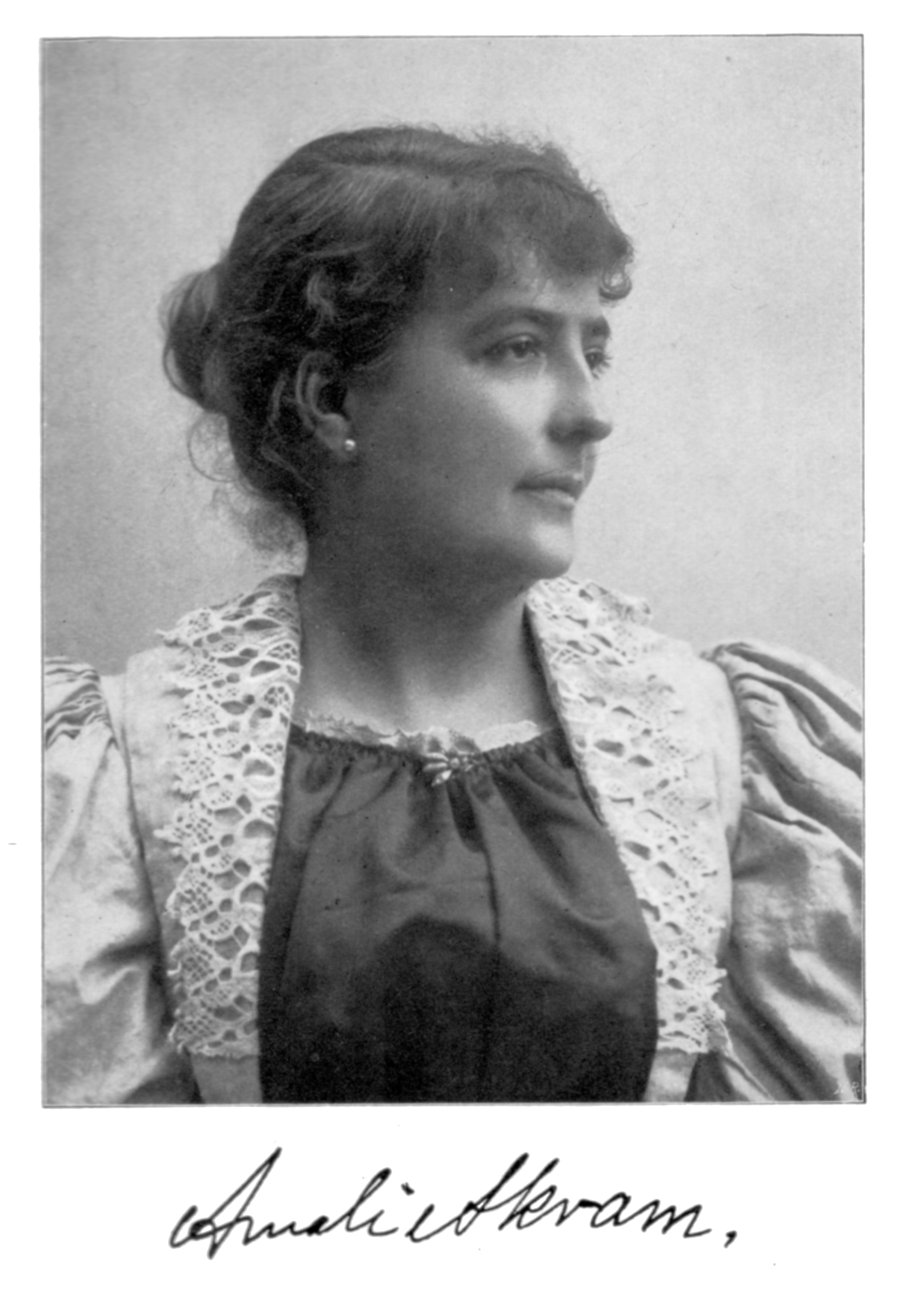
- Photo portrait and signature, published 1905
- Born: Berthe Amalie Alver; 22 August 1846; Bergen, Norway
- Died: 15 March 1905 (age 58); Copenhagen, Denmark
- Occupation: novelist
- Spouses: Bernt Ulrik August Müller (1837–1898); Asbjørn Oluf Erik Skram (1847–1923)
- Children: Jacob Müller (1866–1911); Ludvig Müller (1868–1922); Ida Johanne Skram (1889–1971)
- Writing career
- Pen name: Amalie Mueller
- Movement: Naturalism

Amalie Skram (22 August 1846 – 15 March 1905) was a Norwegian author and feminist who gave voice to a woman's point of view with her naturalist writing. In Norway, she is frequently considered the most important female writer of the Modern Breakthrough (Det moderne gjennombrudd). Her more notable works include a tetralogy, Hellemyrsfolket (1887–98) which portrays relations within a family over four generations.

== Biography ==
=== Early life ===
Berthe Amalie Alver was born in Bergen, Norway. Her parents were Mons Monsen Alver (1819–98) and Ingeborg Lovise Sivertsen (1821–1907). She was the only daughter in a family of five children. Her parents operated a small business, which went bankrupt when Amalie was 17 years old. Her father emigrated from Norway to the United States to avoid a term of imprisonment. Her mother was left with five children to care for.

Her mother pressured Amalie into a marriage with an older man, Bernt Ulrik August Müller (1837–1898), a ship captain and later mill owner. Following thirteen years of marriage and the birth of two sons she suffered a nervous breakdown, in part attributed to his infidelity. After several years in a mental hospital, she was divorced from Müller. Together with her two sons, Jacob Müller (born 1866) and Ludvig Müller (born 1868), she moved to Kristiania (now Oslo) and began her literary activities. There she met the bohemian community, including writers Arne Garborg and Bjørnstjerne Bjørnson, with whom she remained in contact for many years.

=== Denmark ===
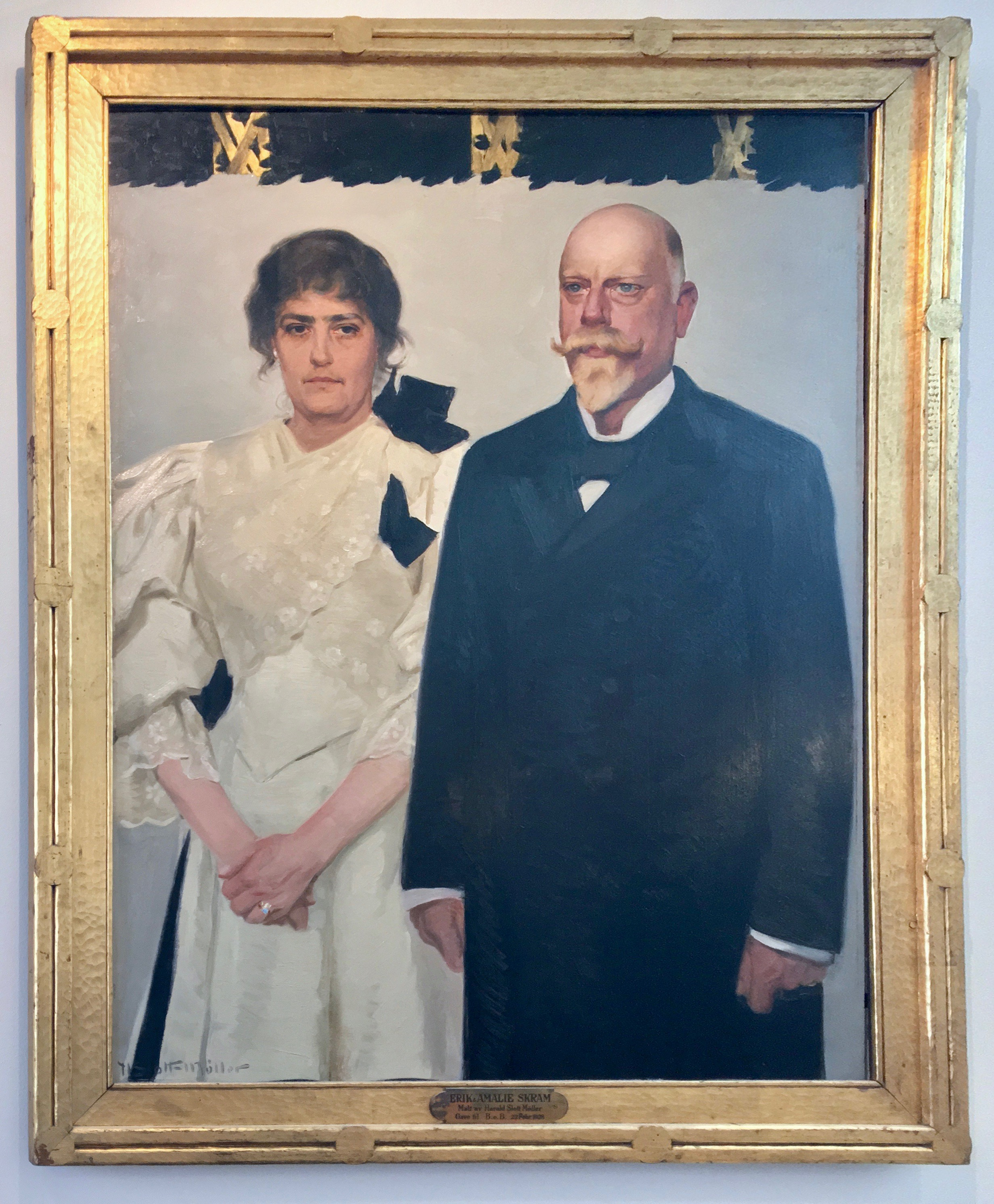
Amalie and Erik Skram, double portrait by the Danish painter Harald Slott-Møller, 1895

In 1884 Amalie Müller married again, this time the Danish writer Asbjørn Oluf Erik Skram (1847–1923), a son of railroad director Gustav Skram. She moved to Copenhagen, Denmark with her new husband. They had a daughter, Ida Johanne Skram (born 1889), from this union. Her obligations as a housewife, mother, and author as well as the public's limited acceptance of her then-radical work, led to a further breakdown in 1894, after which Amalie lived in a psychiatric hospital near Roskilde. In 1900 her second marriage was dissolved. She died six years later in Copenhagen and was buried at Bispebjerg Cemetery.

== Literary career ==
In 1882 Amalie Skram debuted (as Amalie Müller) with the short story "Madam Høiers leiefolk", published in the magazine Nyt Tidsskrift. An excerpt from her first novel, Constance Ring, was first published in the magazine Tilskueren in 1885.

Her works continued until her death. She dealt with topics she knew well. Her work can be divided into three categories:

- Novels concerning marriage, which explored taboo topics such as female sexuality, and the subservient status of women in that period. These works were perceived by many as overly provocative and resulted in open hostility from some segments of society.
- Multi-generation novels, which dealt with the fate of a family over several generations. With these she explored the social institutions and conditions of the time and campaigned for change.
- Mental hospital works such as Professor Hieronimus and Paa St. Jørgen, which dealt with the primitive and brutal conditions of such institutions during the period. Her novels created a major stir in Denmark and precipitated improvements in these institutions.

She is recognized as an early and strong proponent of what has come to be known as the women's movement, setting the early European trend. Her works, which had been generally forgotten after her death, were rediscovered and received strong recognition in the 1960s. Several of her works are currently available in recent translations into English.

== Legacy ==
The Amalie Skram prize is a travel stipend that has been awarded annually since 1994 to Norwegian authors who show exceptional skill in addressing women's issues. The street Amalie Skrams Allé in the Valby district of Copenhagen is named after her.

A statue of Skram by Maja Refsum (1897–1986) was unveiled at Convent Garden (Klosterhaugen) in Bergen 1949. A bronze bust by Per Ung was installed in Bispebjerg Cemetery in Copenhagen in 1996. A marble bust by Ambrosia Tønnesen (1859–1948) is in Bergen Public Library.

She was also honored with a Norwegian postage stamp in 1996. Amalie Skram Upper Secondary School is named after the author.

In recent years, Skram's reputation has been tarnished by revelations about her antisemitism. In letters written to her future husband Erik Skram in the early 1880s, she refers to an acquaintance as a "disgusting, little Jewess" and calls George and Edvard Brandnes "power-hungry, revenge-thirsty Jew talents." She writes that as a "race," Jews are "loathsome." Erik Skram responded to her bigotry with great disappointment, which appeared to provoke some change: Amalie Skram confessed in a subsequent letter to him that "most of all, I would like to learn to erase my hate, learn to love them–and perhaps you can help me with that."

== Works ==
- Madam Høiers leiefolk (Madam Høier's Lodgers), 1882.
- Constance Ring, 1885. English translation by Katherine Hanson and Judith Messick (1988), ISBN 0-8101-1967-6.
- Karens Jul, 1885.
- Lucie, 1888. English translation by Katherine Hanson and Judith Messick (2001), ISBN 1-870041-48-8.
- Fru Inés, 1891. English translation by Judith Messick and Katherine Hanson (2014).
- Forraadt (Betrayed), 1892. Translated into English by Aileen Hennes and published by Pandora Press, Routledge & Kegan Paul (1986); and by Katherine Hanson and Judith Messick (2018).
- Hellemyrsfolket (The People of Hellemyr), a tetralogy of the following four works:
  - Sjur Gabriel, 1887.
  - To venner (Two Friends), 1888.
  - S.G. Myre, 1890.
  - Afkom, 1898.
- Børnefortellinger, short stories, 1890.
- Kjærlighed i Nord og Syd (Love in the North and South), short stories, 1891.
- Agnete, play, 1893.
- Professor Hieronimus, 1895. Translated (with Paa St. Jørgen) into English by Katherine Hanson and Judith Messick as Under Observation (1992).
- Paa St. Jørgen (At St. Jørgen), 1895. Translated (with Professor Hieronimus) into English by Katherine Hanson and Judith Messick as Under Observation (1992).
- Mellom Slagene (Between Conflicts), letters, 1895.
- Sommer (Summer), short stories, 1899.
- Julehelg (Christmas Season), novel, 1900.
- Mennesker (People), 1905 (unfinished).

== Other sources ==
- Engelstad, Irene; Køltzow, Liv; Staalesen, Gunnar (1996) Amalie Skrams Verden (Oslo: Gyldendal) ISBN 9788205243378
- Køltzow, Liv (1992) Den unge Amalie Skram : et portrett fra det nittende århundre (Oslo : Gyldendal norsk forlag) ISBN 8257409499
- Engelstad, Irene (1978) Amalie Skram : kjærlighet og kvinneundertrykking (Oslo: Pax) ISBN 8253009208
