= Carl-Axel Söderström =

Swedish photographer and cinematographer

- Born: Carl-Axel Söderström; 23 December 1893; Korsnäs, Sweden
- Died: 27 November 1976 (aged 82); Nyköping, Sweden
- Occupation: Photographer
- Spouses: Gertrud Martha née Vahl (married 1923–1930); Clärenore Stinnes (married 1930–1976)
- Children: three

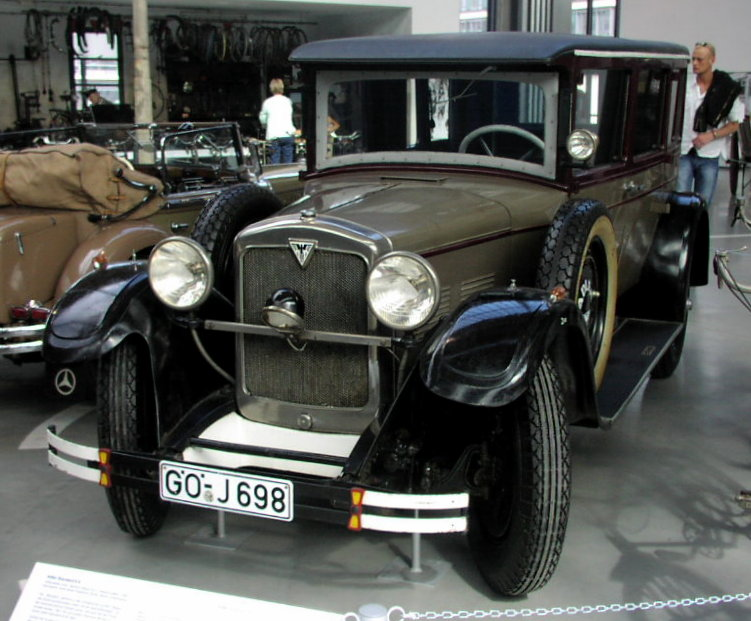
Adler Standard 6, the model in which Söderström journeyed around the world.

Carl-Axel Söderström (23 December 1893 – 27 November 1976) was a Swedish photographer and cinematographer who accompanied Clärenore Stinnes on a two-year automobile journey around the world.

== Biography ==
Söderström was born on 23 December 1893 in Korsnäs, Sweden to a smith.

He was trained as a photographer in the Stockholm branch of the Pathé Brothers Company.

On 25 November 1923, in the German Church, Stockholm Söderström married the four-years-younger Gertrud Martha Vahl, born in Berlin to a German confectioner who had emigrated to Sweden with his wife and six children.

On 25 May 1927 Söderström started to journey around the world, as a photographer for Clärenore Stinnes, whom he had met only two days before their departure, in a mass production Adler Standard 6 automobile and escorted by two mechanics and a freight vehicle with spare parts and equipment. Stinnes' journey was sponsored by the German automotive industry (Adler, Bosch and Aral) with 100,000 Reichsmark.

After their happy return, Carl-Axel Söderström divorced Martha, who died in 1985 without children.

Söderström and Stinnes married in December 1930 and lived on an estate in Sweden, where they raised three children of their own and several foster children. In later years they spent some time of the year in Irmenach. Söderström died in 1976, aged 82, survived by Stinnes.

== Partial filmography ==
- The Story of a Boy (1919)
- 40 Skipper Street (1925)
- To the Orient (1926)
