= Christian Danning =

Danish composer and conductor

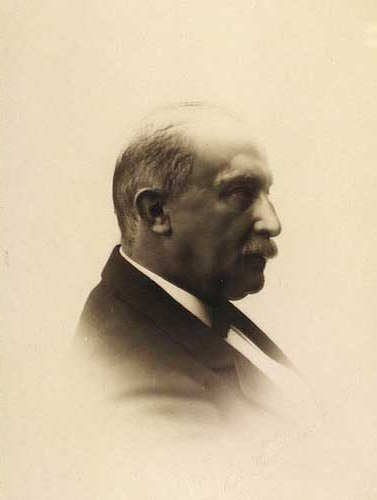
Christian Danning

Sophus Christian Danning (16 June 1867 – 7 November 1925) was a Danish composer and conductor.

From 1898 to 1907 he worked in Bergen as a conductor for the Bergen Philharmonic Orchestra and Den Nationale Scene, and from 1907 to 1914 he conducted at Fahlstrøms Theater. He also wrote operas such as Kynthia in 1903 and operettes such as Columbine in 1912. From 1914 to 1923 he conducted for Odense City Orchestra. He was married to the Norwegian actress Signe Danning.
