= Peter Lykke-Seest =

Norwegian writer

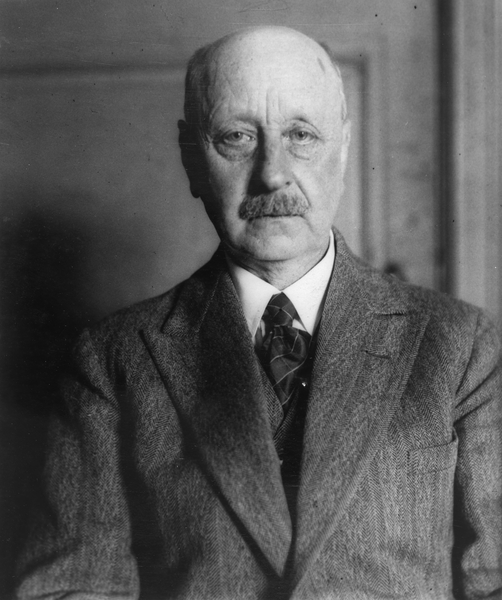
- Lykke-Seest c.1935
- Born: 26 September 1869; Christiania, Norway
- Died: 4 February 1948 (aged 78)
- Occupations: poet novelist playwright non-fiction writer script writer film director
- Spouse: Lila Lykke-Seest (m. 1903)
- Children: Esben Lykke-Seest

Peter Lykke-Seest (26 September 1868 – 4 February 1948) was a Norwegian poet, novelist, playwright, non-fiction writer, script writer and film director.

He was born in Christiania as a son of wholesaler Jens Peter Seest and Caroline Christiane Frederikke Thy. He was married to the actress and writer Lila Lykke-Seest.

He made his literary debut in 1896 with the poetry collection Hvide nætter, and published the novel Under Paddehatten in 1898. His most popular film was Historien om en gut from 1919. He published a book on the trial against Vidkun Quisling in 1945.

== Partial filmography ==
- 1911 Under forvandlingens lov (writer, under the pseudonym Søløvenskjold Pedersen)
- 1913 Blodets röst (writer)
- 1913 Livets konflikter (writer)
- 1914 Halvblod (writer)
- 1917 En vinternat (writer)
- 1917 De forældreløse (writer)
- 1918 Lodsens datter (writer & director)
- 1918 Vor tids helte (writer & director)
- 1919 Æresgjesten (writer & director)
- 1919 Historien om en gut (writer & director)
