= Mowinckel =

Mowinckel is a Norwegian surname. Since the family was mainly involved with trade, many family members moved to trading centers in other countries to oversee the family interest there, and descendants can be found in the United States, Denmark, Venice and quite a few others.

== Notable people ==
Notable people who have this surname include:

- Agnes Mowinckel (1875–1963), Norwegian actress
- Johan Ernst Mowinckel (born 1759) (1759–1816), Norwegian merchant and consul
- Johan Ernst Mowinckel (born 1860) (1860–1947), Norwegian merchant and politician
- Johan Ludwig Mowinckel (1870–1943), Norwegian politician
- Ragnhild Mowinckel (born 1992), Norwegian skier
- Sigmund Mowinckel (1884–1965), Norwegian scholar
- Thorolf Beyer Mowinckel (1884–1963), Norwegian politician
