= Mimi Kihle =

Norwegian actress (1899–1993)

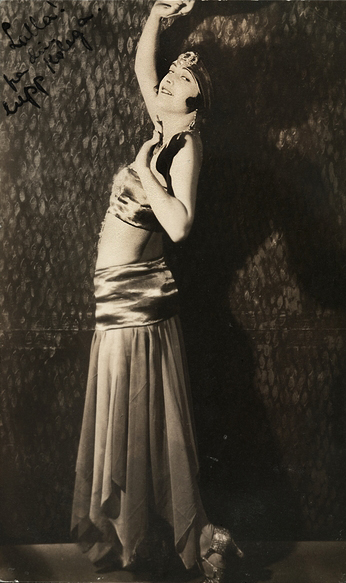
- Born: July 9, 1899; Horten, Norway
- Died: July 4, 1993 (aged 93); Oslo, Norway
- Occupation: Actress

Mimi Azora Kihle (July 9, 1899 – July 4, 1993) was a Norwegian actress.

== Family ==
Kihle was born in Horten, Norway. She was the daughter of the torpedo lieutenant Karl August Kihle (1873–1953) and Helga Josephine (née Johannesdatter, 1876–1959). Her father was the son of Abraham Abrahamsen, and in the 1900 census the family is listed under the surname Abrahamsen (rather than Kihle). In 1931, Kihle married Finn Myklegaard (1901–1986), who was an editor and owner of a publishing house.

== Career ==
Kihle debuted at the Central Theater in 1923 as Gerty in Der keusche Lebemann (The Chaste Libertine, Norwegian title: Levemanden) by Franz Arnold and Ernst Bach. She saw great success as a guest performer at the Apollo Theater in Copenhagen in 1931, where she starred as Pussy Angora in Unter Geschäftsaufsicht (Business in Distress, Norwegian title: Pussy) by the same authors.

On a tour during the Ibsen jubilee in 1928, she played Ingrid, the Green-Clad Woman, and Anitra in Peer Gynt. At the Central Theater in 1929, she played the boy Eyolf in Little Eyolf. She performed at the Central Theater until 1932, and then at the Carl Johan Theater until 1940, when she retired from the stage. She also appeared in films. Together with Odd Frogg (1901–1934), she performed the song "Hvorfor så alene?" (Why So Alone?) in the film Lalla vinner! (1932). It was composed by Dan Folke (1906–1954) and Kai Normann Andersen. The song was also released by His Master's Voice.

== Filmography ==
- 1927: Troll-elgen as Bellina, a dancer
- 1932: Fantegutten as Ilona, Christian and Marja's daughter
- 1932: Lalla vinner! as Ragnhild, the landowner's daughter
- 1938: Bør Børson Jr. as Ida Olsen
