= Ytteborg Brewery =

Former brewery in Norway

- Type: Private
- Industry: brewery
- Founded: 1836
- Headquarters: Oslo, Norway

The Ytteborg Brewery (Ytteborg Bryggeri in Norwegian) was a brewery in Christiania (present-day Oslo), Norway. It was founded in 1836 by Nils Jensen Ytteborg, a master tanner and Member of Parliament in Norway. The company underwent changes in name and ownership during its existence for more than a century. In 2011, Foss Bryggeri AS resumed operations, also headquartered in Oslo.

== Early years ==
The brewery's first facilities were located Hausmanns street 8–12, site of the present-day Blue Cross Building. In 1844, the brewery built cellars for cooling and storage on the Aker hill close to the Old Aker Church. Its large storage rooms, with brick walls and vaults, was very advanced when it was opened in 1843, and crown prince Oscar was present at the opening. The timber-framed building above ground in Akersbakken 22–24 was used for bottling the beer. It was demolished in 1953, when the site was incorporated into the churchyard.

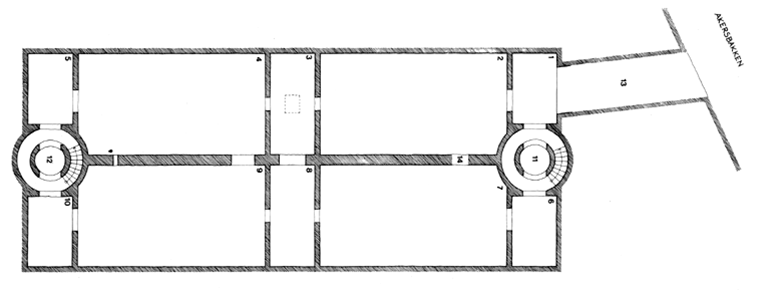
Plan of The Ytteborg brewery cellar, Christiania 1843

In 1897, Ytteborg Brewery transferred its manufacturing plant to Øvre Foss and renamed itself as the Foss Brewery. Nils Jensen' son, Carl Theodor (1827–1888), whom he also trained as a brewer, took over after he vacated his post. In 1888, Inge Ytteborg (1864–1920), the founder's grandson, took over as owner and CEO of Ytteborg Brewery and later Foss Bryggeri AS.

== Milestones ==
In 1900, the Foss Brewery opened the Hotel Continental, Oslo with Theatercaféen, on Stortingsgata opposite the National Theatre (Oslo). Foss Brewery was acquired by the Schou Brewery in 1917, and by 1922 Schou stopped using the Foss Brewery brand. In 1977 Schou's merged with Frydenlund to become Frydenlund Schous Bryggeri. That company was in 1978 acquired by Nora Industrier, which already was the owner of Ringnes. Ringnes was then bought by the Carlsberg Group in 2004. After more than a half century since it closed shop, Foss Bryggeri AS resumed operations in Oslo In 2011.

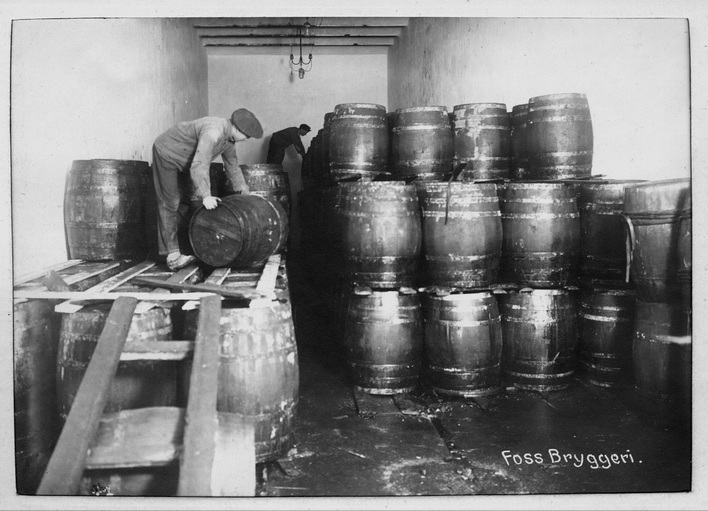
Foss Bryggeri (Courtesy of Digital Museum, Norway), 1917

== World War years ==
When Oslo was occupied during World War II, the brewery's cellars were converted for storage of vegetables to feed German soldiers, and a new entrance was opened from Akersbakken. In 1953, the building above ground was demolished when the Old Aker cemetery was expanded.

== In popular culture ==
During its heyday, Ytteborg beer was so popular, especially for its Bavarian beer, that it became part of the Norwegian folk song, Oleanna (song):

"And Munchener beer, as sweet as Ytteborg's, runs in the creeks for the poor man's delectation."
