= Johan Ernst Mowinckel =

Johan Ernst Mowinckel may refer to:

- Johan Ernst Mowinckel (born 1759) (1759–1816), Norwegian merchant and consul
- Johan Ernst Mowinckel (born 1860) (1860–1947), Norwegian merchant and politician
