= Marta Frogg =

Norwegian actress, singer, and prompter (1871–1950)

- Born: Martha Rynning Olsen; March 18, 1871; Østre Moland Municipality, Norway
- Died: April 2, 1950 (aged 79); Oslo, Norway
- Occupations: Actress, singer, prompter
- Children: Odd Frogg
- Relatives: Ragna Wettergreen

Marta Frogg (also Martha Frogg, née Martha Rynning Olsen, March 18, 1871 – April 2, 1950) was a Norwegian actress, singer, and prompter.

== Family ==
Marta Frogg was born in Østre Moland Municipality, the daughter of the master mason Olaus Olsen (1828–1914) and Inger Marie Rynning Kristensen (1827–1897), and the sister of the actress Ragna Wettergreen (1864–1958). On November 25, 1891, she married the lawyer Nicolai Frogg (1866–?) in Kristiania (now Oslo). She was the mother of the actor Odd Frogg (1901–1934). In contemporary times, the family name was often written Frog.

== Life and work ==
Marta Frogg debuted on November 1, 1907 at the Fahlstrøm Theater in the role of Annette in Maternité (Norwegian title: Ugifte Mødre) by Eugène Brieux. Her sister Ragna Wettergreen played the role of Lucie in the same production. She took part in a theater tour in 1910 and 1911. In addition to appearing in plays, she performed in shows and sang. In the 1927–1928 season, she was a prompter at Agnes Mowinckel's Balkongen theater.

== Selected roles ==
- Annette in Maternité (Norwegian title: Ugifte Mødre) by Eugène Brieux (Fahlstrøm Theater, 1907)
- Florizel in Et Besøg (Norwegian title: Et Besøk) by Edvard Brandes (Randsfjord Theater, 1910)
