= Johan Mowinckel =

Johan Mowinckel may refer to:

- Johan Ludwig Mowinckel (1870–1943), Norwegian prime minister, shipping magnate and philanthropist
- Johan Ernst Mowinckel (born 1759) (1759–1816), Norwegian merchant and consul
- Johan Ernst Mowinckel (born 1860) (1860–1947), Norwegian merchant and politician
