= Edward Mowinckel-Larsen =

Edward Christian Mowinckel-Larsen (13 June 1895 – 7 August 1985) was a Norwegian engineer, civil servant and secretary-general of Norges Varemesse.

== Personal life ==
He was born in Bergen as a son of broker Wilhelm Emil Larsen (1857–1916) and Jørga Mowinckel (1861–1930). On the maternal side he was a nephew of Johan Ernst Mowinckel, Johanne Vogt and Agnes Mowinckel, and a first cousin of Johan Ernst's son Thorolf Beyer Mowinckel.

In 1939 he married Gerda Gundersen from Langesund. His sister Signe married architect Arno Berg.

== Career ==
He enrolled in middle school at Bergen Cathedral School in 1907. Among others he was in the same class as activist Joakim Lehmkuhl and the conductor Johan Ludwig Mowinckel, Jr. After middle school he enrolled in Bergen Technical School whence he graduated in ship engineering in 1916. He worked as such until 1927, when he was hired as a secretary in Norges Varemesse. After stints as head of provisioning in Aker Municipality from 1939 to 1941 and 1945 to 1947, he was the secretary-general of Norges Varemesse from 1947 to 1968. During the occupation of Norway by Nazi Germany he was arrested, and briefly imprisoned in Møllergata 19 from May to June 1941.

He was also secretary-general of Norsk Fiskerimesse from 1960 to 1965 and in 1969, and headed several Norwegian delegations to foreign expos.

He was decorated as a Knight, First Class of the Order of St. Olav (1968) and the Order of the Lion of Finland, Commander of the Order of Vasa, and a Knight of the Order of the Dannebrog and the Order of Leopold, and received the Order of Merit of Austria. He died in August 1985.
