= Karl Hals =

Norwegian politician (1822–1898)

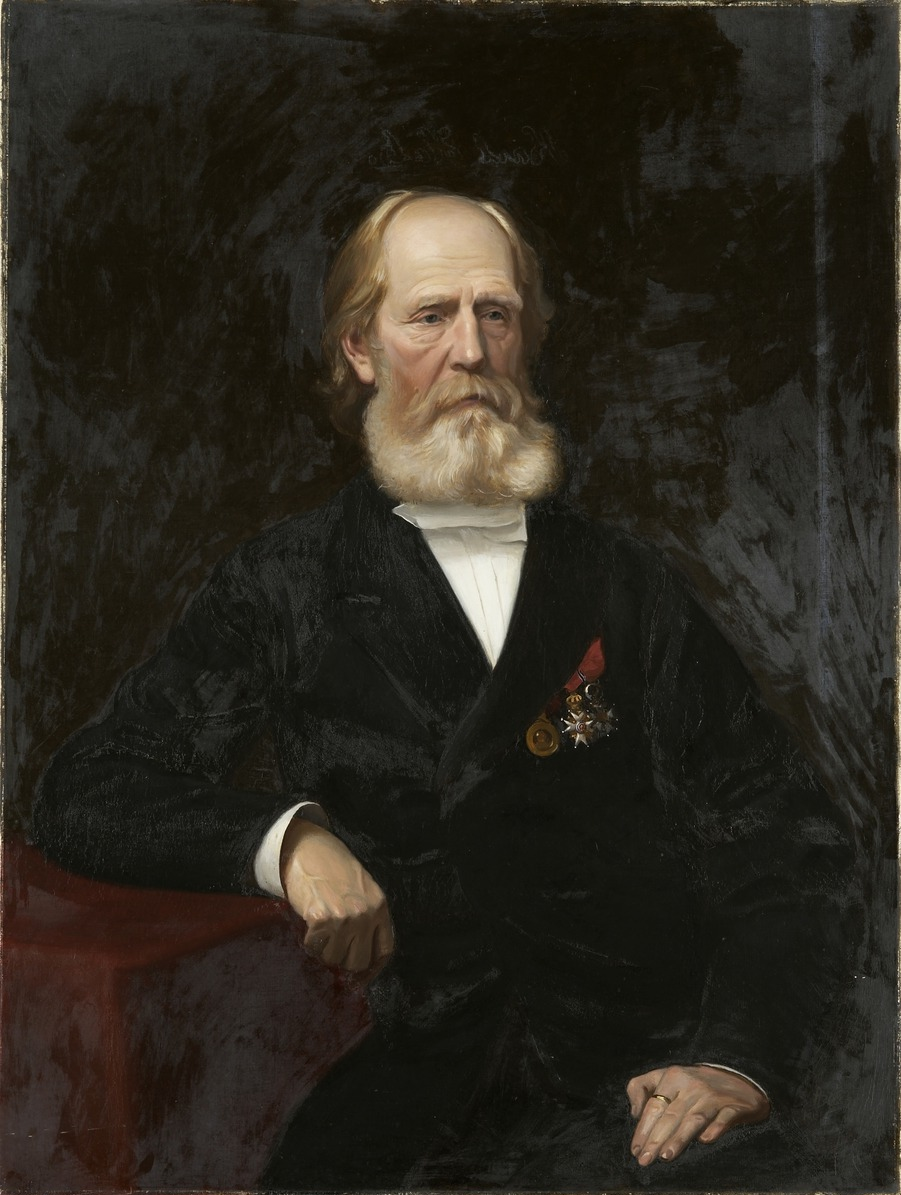
Karl Marius Anton Johan Hals

Karl Marius Anton Johan Hals (27 April 1822 – 7 September 1898) was a Norwegian businessperson who co-founded the piano manufacturer Brødrene Hals . He also served as a members of the Norwegian Parliament with the Conservative Party.

== Background ==
Hals was born at Sørum in Akershus, Norway. He was the son of Caspar Andreas Hals (1772-1846) and Martha Maria Nilson (Nielsen) (1787-1828). His father was a colonel and later customs inspector. When his father was appointed customs inspector in Christiania (now Oslo) in 1828, the family moved there.

He was a student at the Oslo Cathedral School and attended Strøms Military Institute which he resign in 1840. Together with his younger brother Petter Martin Emil Nilson Hals (1823-1871), he took a carpenter's education between 1840 and 1842. After this, Karl Hals spent time in Copenhagen and Hamburg to learn the skill of piano building.

== Career ==
He then returned to Christiania to found the piano factory Brødrene Hals in 1847 together with his brother. Originally they employed only one person; in 1866 this number had risen to 36. They production facilities were moved around in the early years, eventually settling at the site of the later Hotel Continental. His brother died in 1871, however Karl Hals had several sons and grandsons who became involved in the company as managers and owners. By 1897, a year before the death of Karl Hals, the company peaked at 100 employees. It delivered pianos not only to Scandinavian customers, but also to the United States and Australia. One piano is on exhibit in the Norwegian Museum of Science and Technology. From 1887 to 1908 the company also ran a music store and a concert bureau.

Hals was the chairman of the employers' organisation Den Norske Haandvaerks- og Industriforening, Christiania from 1878 to 1897. In addition he was elected to the Norwegian Parliament in 1889, representing the constituency of Kristiania, Hønefoss og Kongsvinger. He only served one term.

== Personal life ==
In 1851, he married Thora Alvilde Christina Svanekiær (1820-1904). Their daughter, Marie, married the musician Ole Olsen. Hals was proclaimed Knight of the Royal Norwegian Order of St. Olav in 1874, and in 1889 he was upgraded to Commander of the same order. He was also Commander of the Order of the Dannebrog as well as Chevalier of the Légion d'honneur.
