= Eikefjord =

Eikefjord may refer to:

== People ==
- Ole Jonny Eikefjord (born 1970), a Norwegian chef, cookbook author, and restaurateur

== Places ==
- Eikefjord (village), a village in Kinn Municipality in Vestland county, Norway
- Eikefjord Church, a church in Kinn Municipality in Vestland county, Norway
- Eikefjord Municipality, a former municipality in the old Sogn og Fjordane county, Norway
- Eikefjorden, a fjord in Kinn Municipality in Vestland county, Norway
