= Lalla vinner! =

1932 film

- Directed by: Erling Bergendahl; George Schnéevoigt
- Written by: Paul Sarauw; Fleming Lynge; Erling Bergendahl
- Starring: Lalla Carlsen; Odd Frogg; David Knudsen
- Cinematography: Valdemar Christensen
- Music by: Kai Normann Andersen; Dan Folke
- Distributed by: Kamerafilm
- Release date: November 7, 1932
- Running time: 83 minutes
- Country: Norway
- Language: Norwegian

Lalla vinner! (Lalla Wins!) is a Norwegian drama film from 1932. It was directed by Erling Bergendahl and George Schnéevoigt, and it starred Lalla Carlsen, Odd Frogg, and David Knudsen.

== Plot ==
After winning a large lottery prize, the kitchen maid Lalla checks into an upscale seaside hotel under the assumed identity of Consul Karlsen. Welcomed with deference by the hotel manager, she occupies two of the establishment’s best rooms. At the same time, landowner Rosen arrives with his daughter Ragnhild, accompanied by lawyer Sadolin, who seeks Ragnhild’s hand. Ragnhild, however, becomes attracted to Axel Berg, a waiter who is in fact a journalist gathering material for his newspaper from the fashionable resort.

Lalla soon attracts Rosen’s attention, while Sadolin intensifies his efforts to secure Ragnhild’s affection. Tensions escalate when Sadolin refuses to grant Rosen a promised loan, prompting Lalla to depart abruptly and return to the capital, where she abandons her role as “consuless.” There, her singing talent earns her a position as a performer at Tivoli, where she later encounters Rosen again and renews their acquaintance.

Rosen’s financial situation deteriorates further due to heavy investment in a trotting horse named Robinson. In an attempt to manipulate the outcome of an important race, Sadolin bribes the jockey to feign illness. Lalla intervenes by driving the sulky herself, winning the race to great acclaim and rescuing Rosen from financial ruin. The story concludes with Lalla uniting with Rosen, while Ragnhild accepts Axel Berg’s courtship.

== Cast ==
- Lalla Carlsen as Lalla Hansen
- Odd Frogg as Alexander Berg, a journalist
- David Knudsen as Rosen, a landowner
- Mimi Kihle as Ragnhild, the landowner's daughter
- Harald Schwenzen as Sigurd Sadolin, a lawyer
- Jens Holstad as Jonassen, a tent operator at the Tivoli amusement park
- Marie Hedemark as Batzeba, a singer at Tivoli
- Ulf Selmer as a groom
