= Thorolf Beyer Mowinckel =

Norwegian businessman and politician (1884–1963)

Thorolf Beyer Mowinckel (27 August 1884 – 8 April 1963) was a Norwegian businessperson and politician for the Conservative Party.

== Personal life ==
He was born in Bergen as a son of Johan Ernst Mowinckel (1860–1947) and Nanna Vibe Selmer Beyer. On the paternal side, he was a nephew of Johanne Vogt and Agnes Mowinckel, and a first cousin of Edward Mowinckel-Larsen.

In 1908 he married Jenny Modesta Fasmer (1887–1961). Through his wife, Thorolf Beyer Mowinckel was a brother-in-law of Hans Fasmer. The couple had the daughter Vibeke, who was married to Lauritz Falk and later Georg Richter.

== Career ==
After middle school he attended commerce schools in London (1901) and Leipzig (1902). He worked at a trade office in Hamburg until 1905, and later entered his father's company, first as an apprentice, then as an employee. From 1912 this was a limited company, with Mowinckel as a board member. In 1922 the company established a branch in Oslo, which in 1929 was merged with Schee & Aas to form the company Schee, Aas & Mowinckel. Thorolf Beyer Mowinckel was a co-owner of this company.

Mowinckel was a member of Bergen city council from 1916 to 1922, the first three years in the executive committee. In the 1933 Norwegian parliamentary election he was elected to the Parliament of Norway from Bergen, and served through one term.

Mowinckel chaired Colonialgrossisternes Forening and Norges Colonialgrossisters Forbund, and was the deputy chairman of Norges Grossistforbund from 1932 to 1942. In June 1942 he was removed from his position by the Nazi authorities in Norway. He was later arrested, and imprisoned in Bredtveit concentration camp from November to December 1943. At the war's end on 8 May 1945, he was reinstated in his position. He was also a supervisory council member of Bergens Privatbank. He died in 1963.
