= Caroline Hansen =

Caroline Hansen may refer to:

- Caroline Graham Hansen (born 1995), Norwegian footballer
- Caroline Boman Hansen (1860–1956), Swedisn–Norwegian hotelier
- Caroline Møller Hansen (born 1998), Danish football player
