= Edition Wilhelm Hansen =

Danish Music Publishing Company

- Company type: Subsidiary
- Industry: Music publishing
- Founded: 1857
- Founder: Jens Wilhelm Hansen
- Headquarters: Copenhagen, Denmark
- Parent: Wise Music Group
- Website: www.wisemusicclassical.com/publisher/edition-wilhelm-hansen/

Edition Wilhelm Hansen, formerly known simply as Hansen, is a Danish music publishing company based in Copenhagen. Currently owned by the Wise Music Group, it was for the majority of its history a family-owned and operated business. Begun by Jens Wilhelm Hansen in his home in 1853, the company was officially incorporated in 1857. The majority of the company was sold to Music Sales Corporation (now Wise Music Group) in 1988 at which point it was re-named Edition Wilhelm Hansen.

== History ==
The Hansen company music publishing firm was founded by Jens Wilhelm Hansen (1821–1904) in 1853 when he began publishing music from his home, but was not officially incorporated until 1857 when he opened a music shop and subscription library in Copenhagen. It was continuously owned and operated by his descendants until the majority of its business was sold to the Music Sales Corporation (now Wise Music Group) in November 1988. The Hansen family maintains the Norsk Musikforlag imprint as the only portion of their company that they did not sell. Family members who took leadership roles of the firm include: Asger Wilhelm Hansen (1889–1976), Svend Wilhelm Hansen (1890–1960), Hanne Wilhelm Hansen (b 1927), and Lone Wilhelm Hansen (1929–1994).

Hansen gained a dominant position in music publishing in Denmark in 1879 when it acquired the music publishers C.C. Løse (founded 1802) and Horneman & Erslev (founded 1846); effectively giving their business a monopoly. In 1880 the company moved into the former Lose headquarters at Gothersgade 11 and remained there for the rest of its history. In 1887 the firm expanded into Germany; establishing a branch in Leipzig that was active until World War II forced it to close. In 1908 the firm jointly purchased the Carl Warmuth music publishing house with the Brødrene Hals company; and Carl Warmuth and Brødrene Hals merged to form Norsk Musikforlag. The Hansen family bought complete control of Norsk Musikforlag in 1910.

In 1915 Hansen founded the Swedish music publishing house Nordiska Musikförlaget in Stockholm. In 1951 the company established the Frankfurt music publishing house Wilhelmiana Musikverlag, and in 1957 they founded the London music publishing house J. & W. Chester. They opened a branch in Helsinki, Finland in 1986.

Some composers who were clientele of Hansen included Hugo Alfvén, Sven-Erik Bäck, Agathe Backer Grøndahl, Antonio Bibalo, Johan Halvorsen, Emil Hartmann, Peter Heise, Vagn Holmboe, Arthur Honegger, Yrjö Kilpinen, Witold Lutosławski, Carl Nielsen, Selim Palmgren, Francis Poulenc, Knudåge Riisager, Hilding Rosenberg, Arnold Schoenberg, Jean Sibelius, Christian Sinding, Emil Sjögren, Igor Stravinsky, Wilhelm Stenhammar, Johan Svendsen, and Svend Erik Tarp. They also published scholarly works by Knud Jeppesen among others.
