= Ulf Selmer =

Norwegian actor and painter

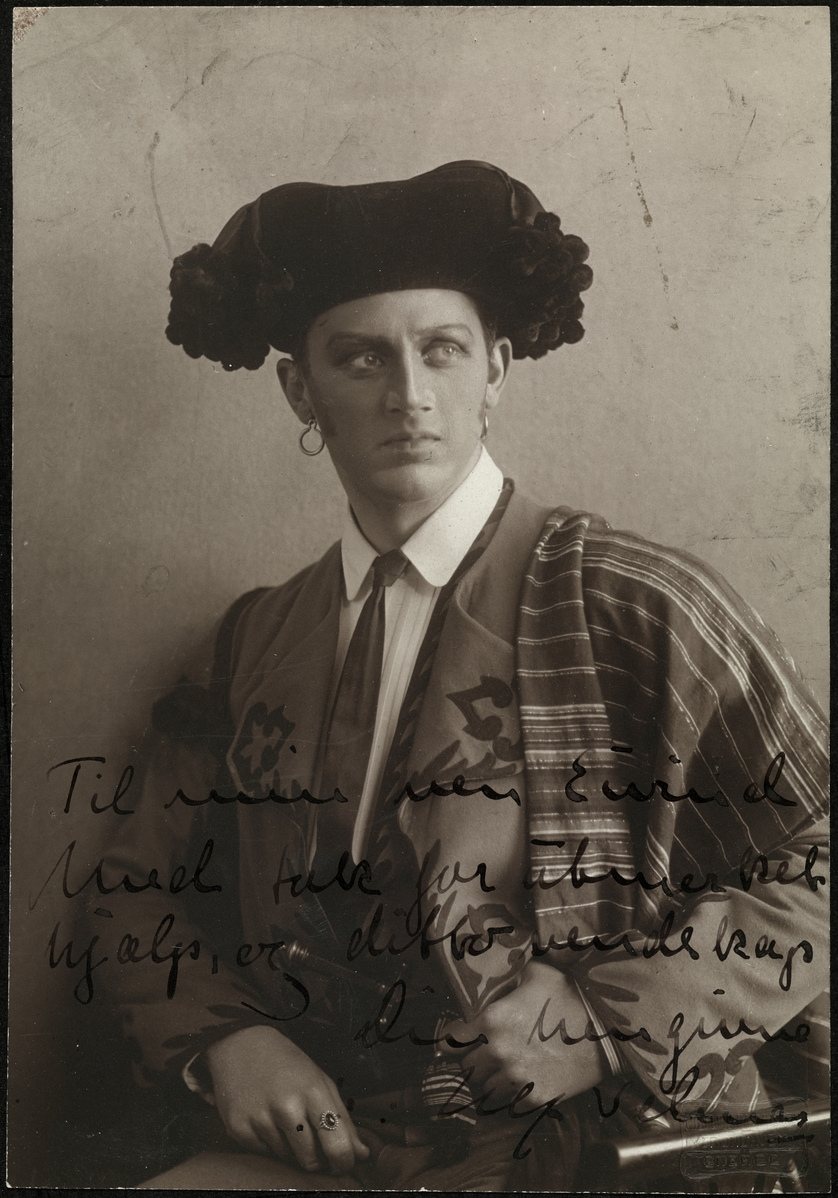
- Born: December 10, 1885; Christiania (now Oslo), Norway
- Died: September 24, 1961 (aged 75); Norway
- Resting place: Cemetery of Our Saviour
- Occupations: Actor and painter
- Parents: Jens Selmer (father); Leonora Selmer (mother)

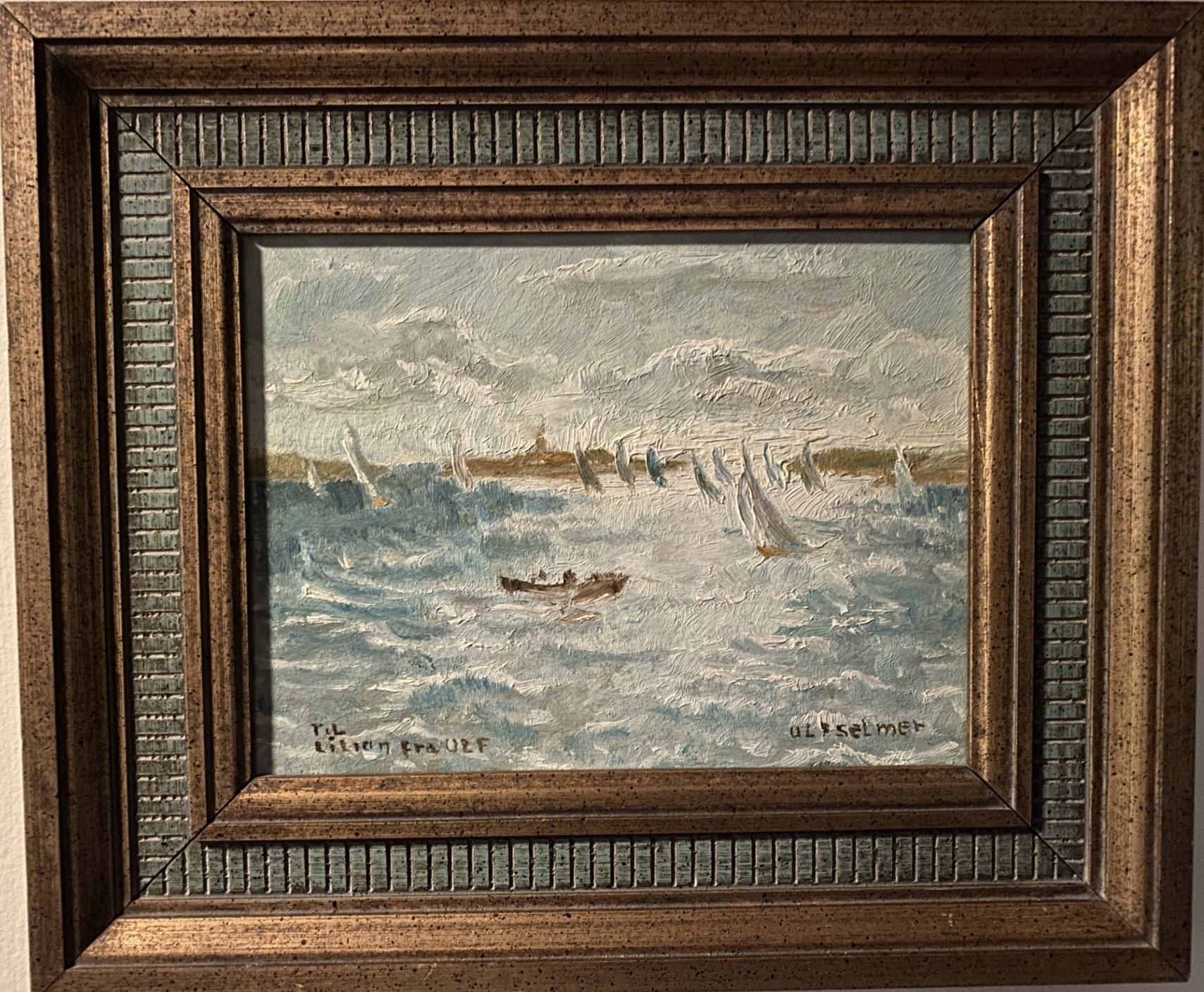
A painting of sailboats by Ulf Selmer.

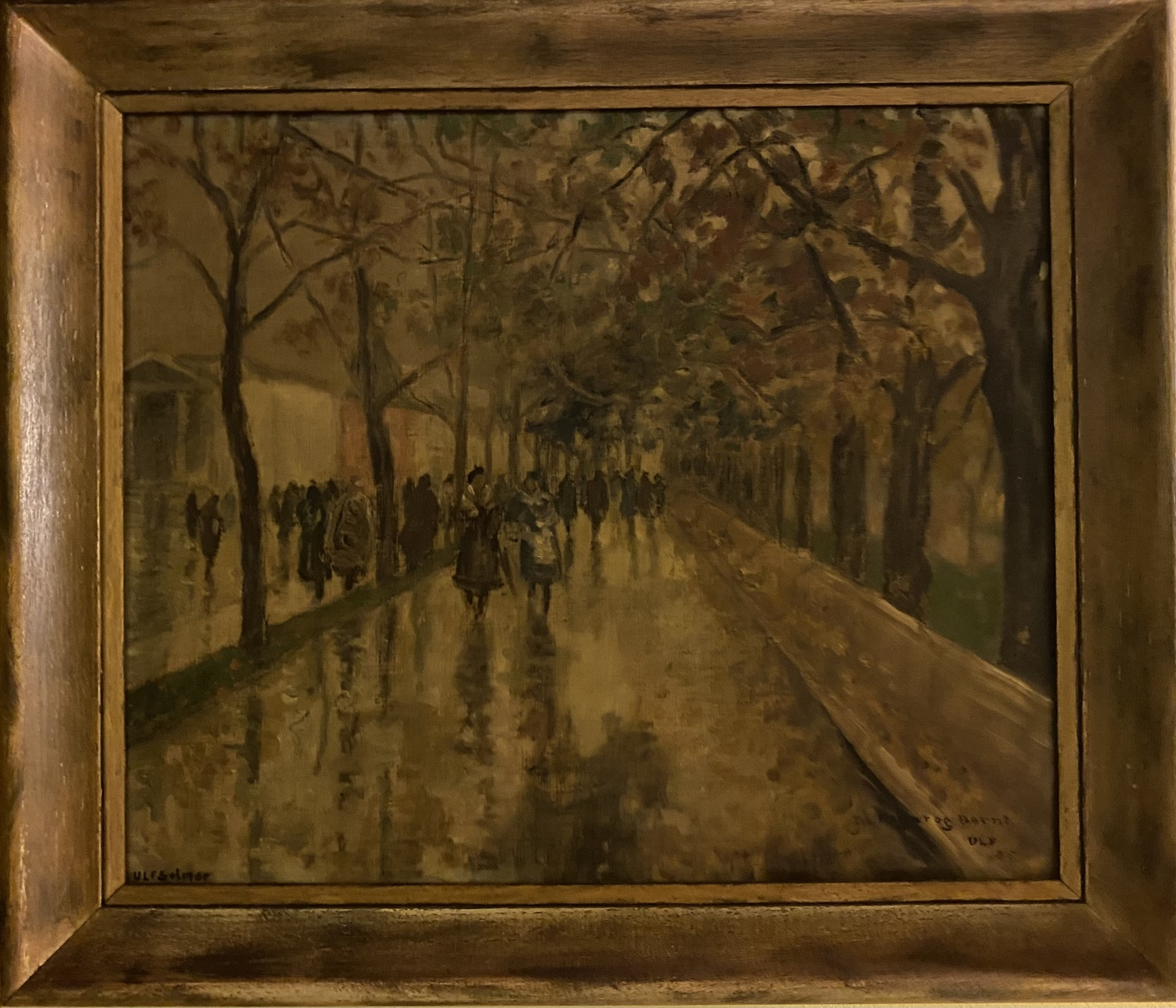
Street scene by Ulf Selmer, 1955

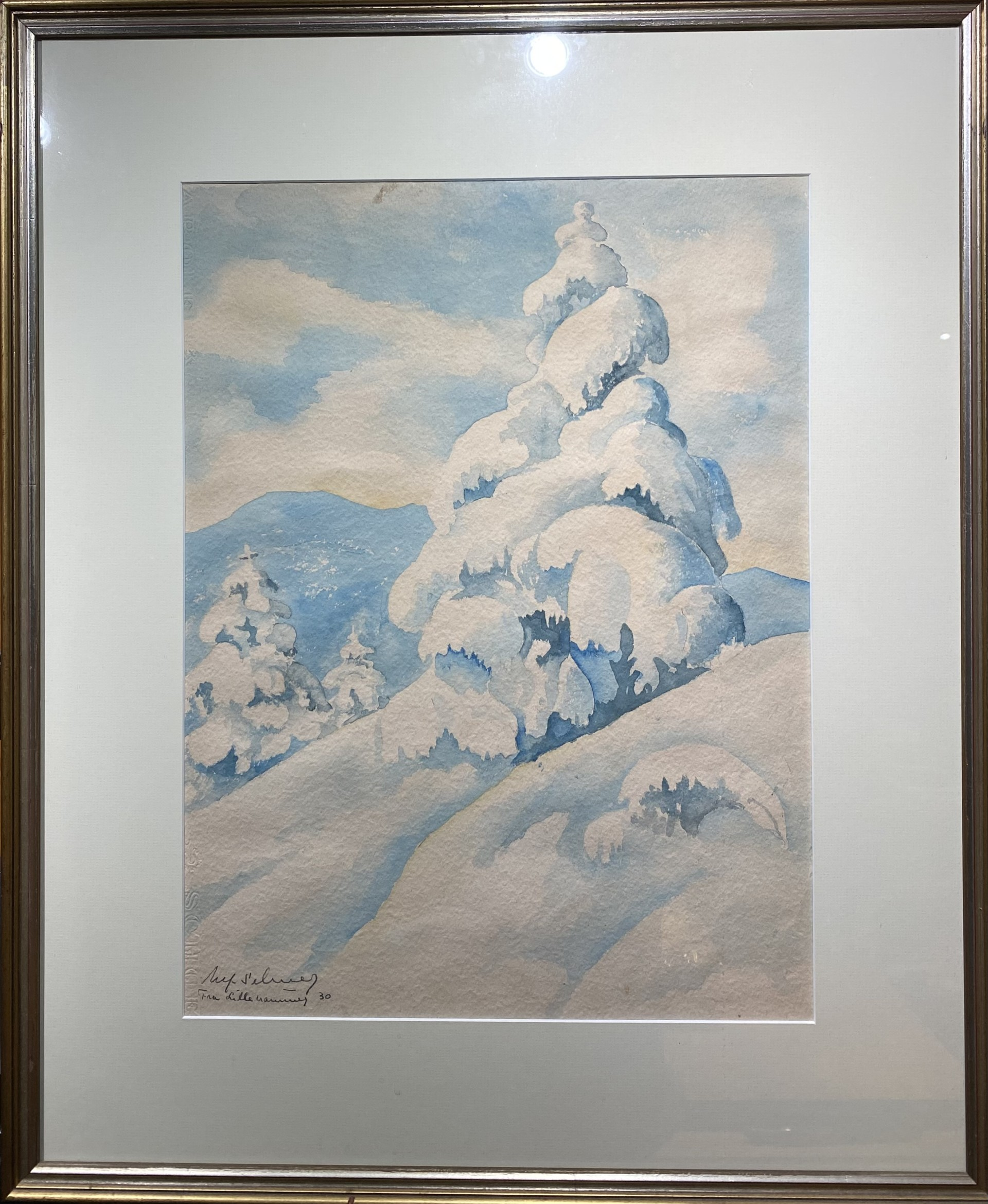
Snow covered tree watercolor signed by Ulf Selmer., 1930

Ulf Selmer (December 10, 1885 – September 24, 1961) was a Norwegian actor and painter.

Selmer was the son of the actor Jens Selmer (1845–1928) at the Christiania Theater and his wife, the actress Eleonora Josephine Nielsen (1850–1930), whose stage name was Leonora Selmer.

Selmer debuted at the Central Theater in 1904; he was in the National Tour (Nationalturneen) traveling ensemble of Ludovica Levy (1856–1922) for one year before he was at the Fahlstrøm Theater for one year. In 1911 he moved to the newly opened Trondheim National Theater, where he remained until 1918. This was followed by three years at Chat Noir and one year at the National Theatre in Oslo before he returned to the Central Theater, where he celebrated the fortieth year of his acting career in 1944. His last appearance on stage was around 1954.

He helped shape Norwegian film from the silent film era to more modern films in the mid-1950s. He made his debut in Den nye lensmannen in 1926, which was directed by Leif Sinding. His last film was Portrettet (1954), directed by Per Aabel.

Selmer was a skilled painter, and some of his works are displayed in the Oslo City Museum.

== Filmography ==
- 1926: Den nye lensmannen as Knut Øverbø, a wealthy farmer
- 1927: Fjeldeventyret as Østmoe, the bailiff
- 1927: Syv dage for Elisabeth as Frantz Markel
- 1932: Lalla vinner! as a groom
- 1933: Vi som går kjøkkenveien as the landowner Adolf Beck
- 1941: Kjærlighet og vennskap as Per Arnesen, a lawyer
- 1942: Det æ'kke te å tru as Abel, a wholesaler
- 1947: Sankt Hans fest as Sørensen, a hat maker
- 1952: Trine! as Uncle Joachim
- 1954: Kasserer Jensen as a judge
- 1954: Portrettet as Hammer, a pharmacist
