= Hans Fasmer =

Norwegian businessperson and politician

Hans Berent Forman Fasmer (29 July 1875 – 16 October 1961) was a Norwegian businessperson and politician for the Liberal Party.

== Personal life ==
He was born in Bergen to a factory owner Jan Hendrik Fasmer (1842–1912) and Magdalene Christine Tornøe (1853–1909). His uncle Hendrik Jansen Fasmer was also a factory owner, in a family of merchants who had migrated from Bremen in the 1500s and owned the Alvøen estate since the mid-1700s.

In February 1903, he married Frieda Cathrine Giæver (1879–1961), a merchant's daughter. He was also a brother-in-law of Thorolf Beyer Mowinckel.

== Career ==
He finished middle school at Hambro School in 1889. He travelled to Germany to work in paper factories in Düsseldorf and Schwarzwald, and later graduated in machine engineering from Technikum Mittweida in 1896. Later, he worked in the United States and subsequently in the family-owned paper factories Alvøen Papirfabrik and Sævareid Karton- & Papfabrik, from 1901 as manager.

When his father died in 1912, he became the owner of Sævareid Karton- & Papfabrik. He also founded Kongshavn Lim- og Gelatinefabrik, which changed its name to Kongshavn Lim- og Mineralnæringfabrik in the 1930s. In 1930, he inherited Alvøen from his uncle. He was known as a paternalistic industrialist, operating this system locally until after the Second World War. He was also a board member of the Federation of Norwegian Industries.

Fasmer was a member of Bergen city council from 1922 to 1930, serving as deputy mayor from 1925 to 1928. From 1927 to 1928 he chaired the local branch of the Liberal Party. In 1924, 1927 and 1927 he was elected deputy representative to the Parliament of Norway. He became a full representative between 1928 and 1931, when regular representative Johan Ludvig Mowinckel served as Prime Minister.

During the occupation of Norway by Nazi Germany he was imprisoned in Bergen Prison in August 1941, accused of harboring a fugitive. He was released, but throughout the war "incessantly" called in and questioned by Gestapo. Fasmer was a board member of Andresens og Bergens Kreditbank, and from 1923 to 1925 he chaired Kgl. Norsk Motorbåtforening. He died in October 1961 in Bergen.
