= Stein Grieg Halvorsen =

Norwegian actor

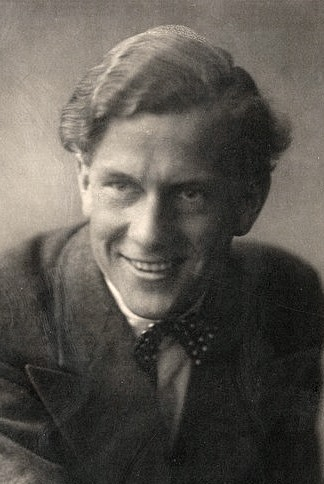
Stein Grieg Halvorsen (1935)

Halvor Bernt Stein Grieg Halvorsen (19 October 1909 – 11 November 2013) was a Norwegian theatre actor.

Stein was born in Kristiania as the son of composer Johan Halvorsen (1864–1935) and Annie Grieg (1873–1957). He was married to Odd Frogg's widow Elizabeth Inga Else Margrethe Thaulow (1903–1968) from 1940 until 1971, then after her death to Vibeke Laura Mowinckel Falk. Stein Grieg Halvorsen was employed at Nationaltheatret from 1928 to 1935, Den Nationale Scene from 1935 to 1936, and again Nationaltheatret from 1936 to 1939 and from 1945 to his retirement in 1997.

His son, Stein Johan Grieg Halvorsen, is half of the comedy duo Erlend & SteinJo, who rose to fame in the 1990s.

Halvorsen died of natural causes on 11 November 2013, three weeks after his 104th birthday.

== See also ==
- List of centenarians (actors, filmmakers and entertainers)
