= Grøndahl & Søn Forlag =

Norwegian publishing house

Grøndahl & Søn Forlag was a Norwegian publishing house established in 1812. Christopher Grøndahl (1784–1864) started it as a print in 1812, before it started commercial publishing in 1875. In 1925 the company expanded into piano manufacturing when it purchased Hals, an Oslo-based piano company. It was acquired by J.W. Cappelens Forlag in 1990, merged with Dreyers Forlag in 1991 into Grøndahl & Dreyers Forlag. The latter company was merged into Cappelen in 1999.
