= Leonora Selmer =

Norwegian actress (1851–1930)

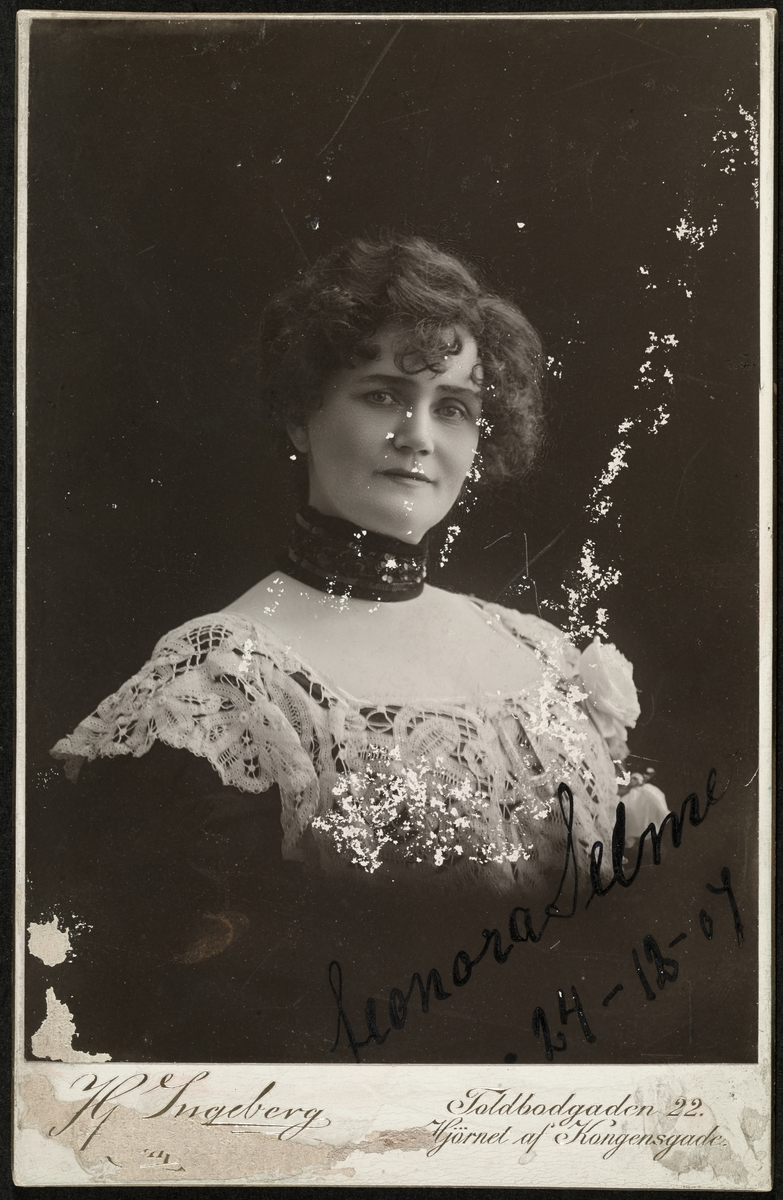
- Born: October 15, 1851; Kragerø, Norway
- Died: February 12, 1930 (aged 78); Oslo, Norway
- Resting place: Cemetery of Our Saviour
- Occupation: Actor
- Spouse: Jens Selmer
- Children: Ulf Selmer

Eleonora Josephine Selmer (née Nielsen, October 15, 1851 – February 12, 1930) was a Norwegian theater actress.

Leonora Selmer was born in Kragerø, the daughter of the printer Johan Peter Nielsen and Karoline Krøger. On January 25, 1873, she married her fellow actor Jens Selmer, and they were the parents of the actor and painter Ulf Selmer.

According to Liv Jensson, she debuted at the New Christiania Norwegian Theatre (a.k.a. the Møllergaden Theater) between 1870 and 1873. She had her first major role in the fall of 1870 as Alice de Rochegune in Ernest Legouvé's Par droit de conquête (Norwegian title: En Brud ved Erobring).

She later worked at the Christiania Theater and after that at the National Theatre. In the summer of 1899 she participated in the Christiania Tour (Norwegian: Christianiaturneen), in which she played the role of Mathilde in Hans Huckebein (Norwegian title: Damen fra Ostende) by Gustav Kadelburg and Oscar Blumenthal.

Leonora Selmer is buried at the Cemetery of Our Saviour in Oslo.

== Selected roles ==
- Alice de Rochegune in Par droit de conquête (Norwegian title: En Brud ved Erobring) by Ernest Legouvé (1870)
- Stine Isenkræmmers in Barselstuen by Ludvig Holberg (National Theatre, 1899)
- Clementine in Le Testament de César Girodot (Norwegian title: César Girodots Testamente) by Edmond Villetard and Adolphe Belot (National Theatre, 1899)
- Mathilde in Hans Huckebein (Norwegian title: Damen fra Ostende) by Gustav Kadelburg and Oscar Blumenthal (Christiania Tour, 1899)
