= Fantegutten =

1932 film

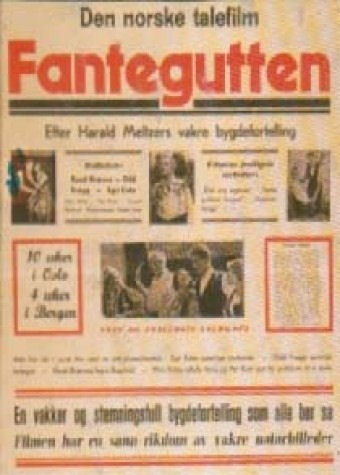
- Directed by: Leif Sinding
- Written by: Leif Sinding
- Based on: Harald Meltzer's novel Fantegutten
- Produced by: Leif Sinding
- Starring: Odd Frogg; Egil Eide; Randi Brænne; Mimi Kihle; Helga Rydland
- Cinematography: Helmer Ekdal
- Edited by: Leif Sinding; Helmer Ekdal
- Music by: Reidar Thommessen; Jacques Armand
- Distributed by: Viking-Film A/S
- Release date: 1932
- Running time: 73 minutes
- Country: Norway
- Language: Norwegian

Fantegutten (The Gypsy) is a Norwegian film from 1932 directed by Leif Sinding. Sinding also wrote the screenplay, which was based on Harald Meltzer's novel of the same name, published posthumously in 1873. Egil Sætren designed the sets.

== Plot ==
The film opens in a valley on a spring day. A couple is buried in an avalanche, but their son Iver miraculously succeeds in escaping. He is found by the wealthy farmer Sjur Rognved, who lets the boy stay with him. Growing up, Ivar falls in love with the farmer's daughter Ragnhild, who returns his love. One day a group of Gypsies comes to the farm, and a woman in the group, Marja, recognizes Iver as her nephew. When the farmer learns this, he no longer wants Ragnhild to marry Iver because he does not consider "Gypsy blood" pure. Iver is furious about this and takes refuge with the travelers. However, Iver finds their wandering life too uncertain and he grows tired of it. When he hears that Ragnhild will marry Bottolf, he leaves the travelers and returns home. He succeeds in stopping the wedding at the last moment, and finally the wealthy farmer also gives his approval for the marriage between Iver and Ragnhild.

There is another version of the film with an alternative ending, in which Iver interrupts Sjur and Ragnhild before they arrive at the church. Then one sees Ragnhild and Iver in the church singing a hymn along with an open Bible between them.

== Music ==
- "Fanteguttens lengsel" (The Gypsy Boy's Longing; composed by Reidar Thommessen)
- "Foni mi gitara" (composed by Reidar Thommessen)
- "Elsk mig, zigeuner" (Love Me, Gypsy; composed by Jacques Armand, a.k.a. Olof Thiel)

== Cast ==
- Odd Frogg as Iver, the Gypsy boy
- Egil Eide as Sjur Sjursen Rognved, a wealthy farmer
- Helga Rydland as Aase, Sjur's wife
- Randi Brænne as Ragnhild, Sjur and Aase's daughter
- Amund Rydland as Mons Bottolfsen
- Finn Bernhoft as Bottolf, his son
- Oscar Larsen as the priest
- Reidar Kaas as Parkas, a Gypsy chief
- Ellen Sinding as Tatjana, a dancer
- Marie Hedemark as Marja, a fortuneteller
- Eugen Skjønberg as Christian, Marja's husband
- Mimi Kihle as Ilona, Christian and Marja's daughter
- Per Kvist as Elias, a Gypsy
- Alfred Maurstad as Stephan, a Gypsy
- Arthur Barking as Boris, a Gypsy
- Egil Sætren as a vagabond, Iver's father
- Alfhild Grimsgaard as the vagabond's wife, Iver's mother
