= Nils Jensen Ytteborg =

Norwegian politician

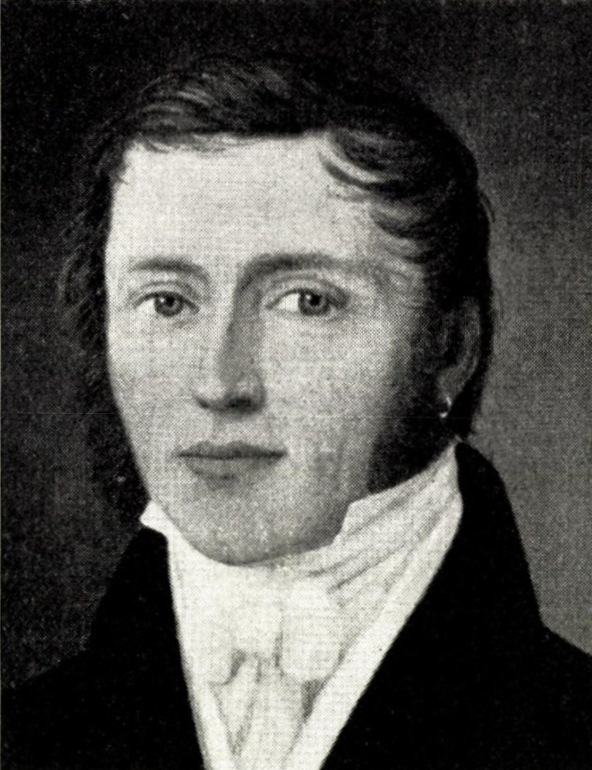
- Born: 18 September 1792; Oslo, Norway
- Died: 5 June 1858 (aged 65)
- Occupations: Tanner, businessman, and member of the Norwegian Parliament
- Spouse: Ingeborg Marie Woxen
- Parents: Jens Jonsen Ytteborg; Randi Nilsdatter Ytteborg

Nils Jensen Ytteborg (18 September 1792 – 5 June 1858) was a Norwegian tanner, businessman, and member of the Norwegian Parliament.

== Career ==
Ytteborg first worked as a saddler and tanner before eventually expanding his business into selling timber and distilled products. In 1836, he founded Ytteborg Brewery, which was later renamed as Foss Brewery.

On 8 November 1838, he helped establish the Christiana Craftsmen Association to protect the rights and welfare of craftsmen and workers in Christiana, including the initiative to professionalize the ranks. By 1842, he was one of the richest men in Christiania. Ytteborg's initiatives for tradespeople helped to make him the first craftsman elected as member of the Norwegian Parliament (1851–1853).

== Personal life ==
Ytteborg was born to Jens Jonsen and Randi Nilsdatter Ytteborg. The Ytteborg family originally hailed from the Ytteborg farm in the parish of Løten in Hedmark county (in the present-day Løten Municipality).

His brother migrated to Slagelse, Denmark, to work as a saddler while he opted to settle in Christiania (now Oslo) for his work. He married Ingeborg Marie Woxen (1796–1868) with whom he had two sons: Carl Theodor (1827–1888) and Julius Ferdinand (1830–1910). He trained his son Carl Theodor in his craft, and he took over the brewery after his father.

Ytteborg died on 5 June 1858, aged 65.

== Legacy ==
In 1958, 100 years after his death, a road in the suburb of Haugenstua in the Oslo district of Stovner was named Garver Ytteborgs vei in memory of him.
