= Jens Selmer =

Norwegian actor (1845–1928)

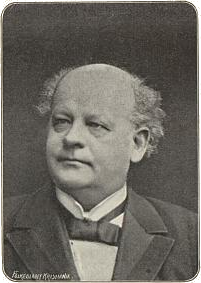
- Born: July 14, 1845; Christiania (now Oslo), Norway
- Died: May 21, 1928 (aged 82); Oslo, Norway
- Resting place: Cemetery of Our Saviour
- Occupation: Actor
- Spouse: Leonora Selmer
- Children: Ulf Selmer
- Relatives: Johan Selmer

Jens Andreas Ludvig Selmer (July 14, 1845 – May 21, 1928) was a Norwegian stage actor and a film actor from the silent-film era.

Selmer made his debut in 1865 at the Christiania Theater, where he remained until 1899, except for two seasons at the New Christiania Norwegian Theatre (a.k.a. the Møllergaden Theater) under the direction of Bjørnstjerne Bjørnson. From 1899 to 1908 he was engaged with the National Theater. Selmer was a skilled and reliable character comedian. Among his roles were Jeppe in Jeppe on the Hill, Aslaksen in The League of Youth, and Old Ekdal in The Wild Duck.

Selmer was the son of Ludvig Selmer (1813–1898) and Maria Magdalene Selmer (1817–1903). His father was a manager at the Christiania Glass Shop. His brother Johan Selmer (1844–1910) became a well-known composer. With his wife Leonora Selmer (1850–1930), who was also an actress, he was the father of actor Ulf Selmer (1885–1961).

== Filmography ==
- 1917: Unge hjerter as the priest
