= Marie Hedemark =

Norwegian actress (1873–1959)

- Born: March 24, 1873; Kristiania (now Oslo), Norway
- Died: August 8, 1959 (aged 86); Oslo, Norway
- Occupation: Actress
- Spouse: Hans Ingi Hedemark

Marie "Maja" Hedemark (March 24, 1873 – August 8, 1959) was a Norwegian actress.

== Family ==
Hedemark was the daughter of the teacher Emil Bernhard Olsen (1842–1897) and Severine Mathilde Heidenstrøm. She was born in Kristiania (now Oslo), Norway. She married the actor Hans Ingi Hedemark on December 23, 1905.

== Career ==
Hedemark made her debut at the Fahlstrøm Theater in 1899 under the name Marie Heiden, a name derived from her mother's maiden name. She was associated with that theater until it closed in 1911. She was employed at the Central Theater from 1911 until around 1942.

Hedemark made her film debut in 1926 in Den nye lensmannen. In the 1930s she appeared in seven more films, including Fantegutten (1932), Lalla vinner! (1932), and Bør Børson Jr. (1938), which was her last film role. In the 1930s, Hedemark was also active at the Oslo New Theater.

== Filmography ==
- 1926: Den nye lensmannen as Berthe Brødlaus, Jens's wife
- 1931: Den store barnedåpen as a woman
- 1932: Prinsessen som ingen kunne målbinde as the brothers' mother
- 1932: Fantegutten as Marja, a fortuneteller
- 1932: Lalla vinner! as Batzeba, a singer at Tivoli
- 1937: To levende og en død as a guest at the hostel
- 1938: Ungen as a working woman
- 1938: Bør Børson Jr. as Ole Elveplassen's wife
