= Caroline Boman Hansen =

Norwegian hotelier

- Born: 10 August 1860; Östervåla, Sweden
- Died: 5 January 1956 (aged 95); Oslo, Norway
- Occupation: Hotelier
- Known for: Hotel Continental, Oslo; Theatercaféen

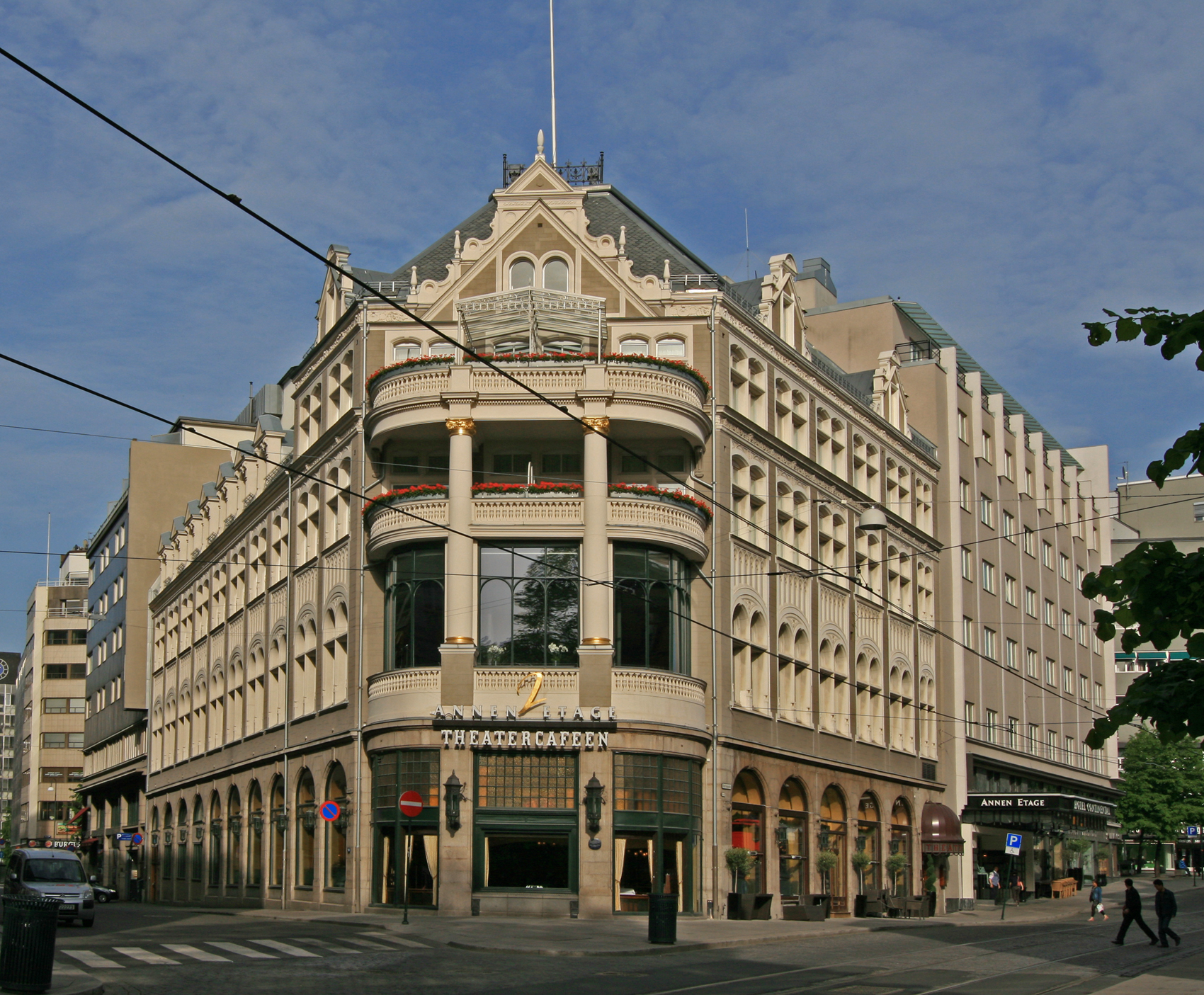
Hotel Continental, Oslo

Caroline Boman Hansen (10 August 1860 – 5 January 1956) was a Swedish–Norwegian hotelier.

She was born in Östervåla, Sweden, to Claes Erik Boman and Carin Persdotter. She married waiter, later hotelier, Hans Christian Marinius Hansen (1868–1915) in 1891. Hotel Continental and Theatercaféen in Kristiania (now Oslo) opened during 1900 and were originally owned by the Foss Brewery. Caroline and Christian Hansen took over the lease in 1909 and within three years they purchased the establishment. The hotel's dining place, Theatercaféen, came to be one of the most popular in Kristiania, and a favourite among actors, writers and journalists.

Caroline Hansen ran the hotel for many years, first along with her husband, and later jointly with her son Arne who died in 1954. His daughter Ellen Brochmann subsequently took over management. The hotel is owned and operated today by Caroline and Christian Hansen's descendants in the fourth generation.
