= Foss Brewery =

Brewery in Oslo, Norway

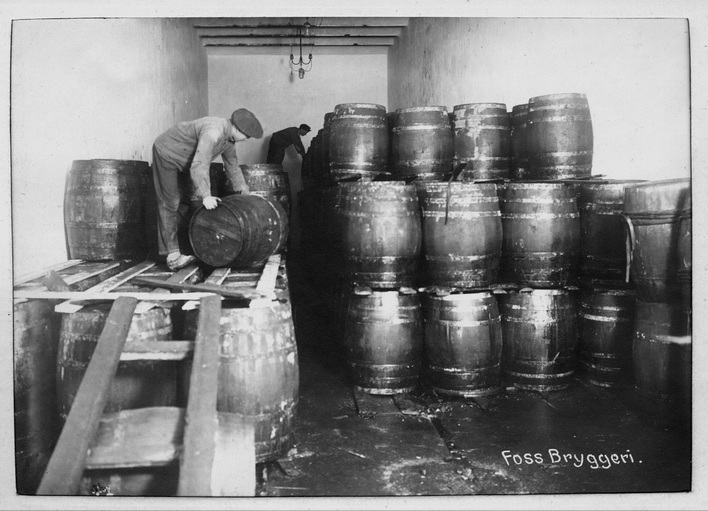
The Foss Brewery in 1917

The Foss Brewery (Norwegian: Foss Bryggeri) was a brewery in Oslo. The company was started in 1836 as the Ytteborg Brewery (Ytteborgs Bryggeri) and was located on Hausmanns gate (Hausmann Street). In the 19th century, the water in the lower part of the Aker River became too contaminated to brew beer, and the brewery needed more space. Therefore in 1897 the brewery relocated to new premises further upriver, above the town's Grünerløkka district at Upper Falls (Øvre Foss)—one of two waterfalls forming Vøyen Falls (Vøyenfallene, Vøyenfoss). The company also changed its name to Foss Bryggeri (literally, 'Falls Brewery') to reflect the new location.

== Ytteborg Brewery ==
The Ytteborg Brewery was founded by Nils Jensen Ytteborg in Christiania i 1836, with cellars below Old Aker Church. The Ytteborg Brewery was especially well-known for its Bavarian beer. After the operations were relocated upriver in 1897, the old cellars were used for various purposes, including vegetable storage during the Second World War. The cellars started deteriorating in the 1950s, when the cemetery at the church was expanded.

== New operations ==
In 1897, the brewery built a large factory at Vøyen Falls, where a brick factory (Øvre Foss teglverk or Foss teglverk) had been located, at what is today the level area and parking space between the old Ringnes Brewery and the Aker River. At the same time, the company changed its name to Aktieselskabet Foss Bryggeri. The address of the company was Thorvald Meyers gate (Thorvald Meyer Street) no. 9.

The new brewery continued to use the old cellars at Old Aker Church, but later built its own cellars next to the new factory. The Foss Brewery was headed by Carl Theodor Ytteborg, who was the son of the original brewery's founder. The Foss Brewery produced the brands Bayersk Øl and Pilsener Øl, as well as Lands Øl, Bok Øl, Malt Øl, Vørter Øl, Kulmbacher Øl, Lager Øl, and Salvator Øl (launched on March 14, 1899). The brewery was very successful, and it expanded its production facilities. In 1899 it purchased the venue on Oslogate (Oslo Street) where the restaurant Oslo Spiseforretning is now located, and in 1900 it built the Hotel Continental and Theatercaféen restaurant, which the brewery leased to various restaurateurs.

The Foss Brewery won a gold medal for its beer at the Paris world's fair in 1900. The company was the leading brewery in Christiania when Haakon VII became king in 1905. Haakon followed the Danish tradition by issuing royal warrants of appointment; the Foss Brewery was selected for royal appointment to supply beer, for which it received an exclusive right. With this, the brewery obtained the prestigious right to print the Norwegian royal crown on its labels and to add the term eneberettiget 'exclusive privilege' to its brands Bayersk Øl and Pilsener Øl.

The Foss Brewery was very successful until it had economic problems during the First World War (1914–1918), when the raw materials used for brewing, some of which came from Germany, were rationed and the brewery was unable to obtain regular deliveries. As a result, the Foss Brewery was sold to the Schou Brewery in 1917 for NOK 1.5 million. The Schou Brewery had more product lines and was therefore able to manage better under wartime rationing. The Schou Brewery stopped using the Foss label in 1922.

The brewery buildings at Vøyen Falls were torn down in the 1960s.
