= Ragna Wettergreen =

Norwegian actress (1864–1958)

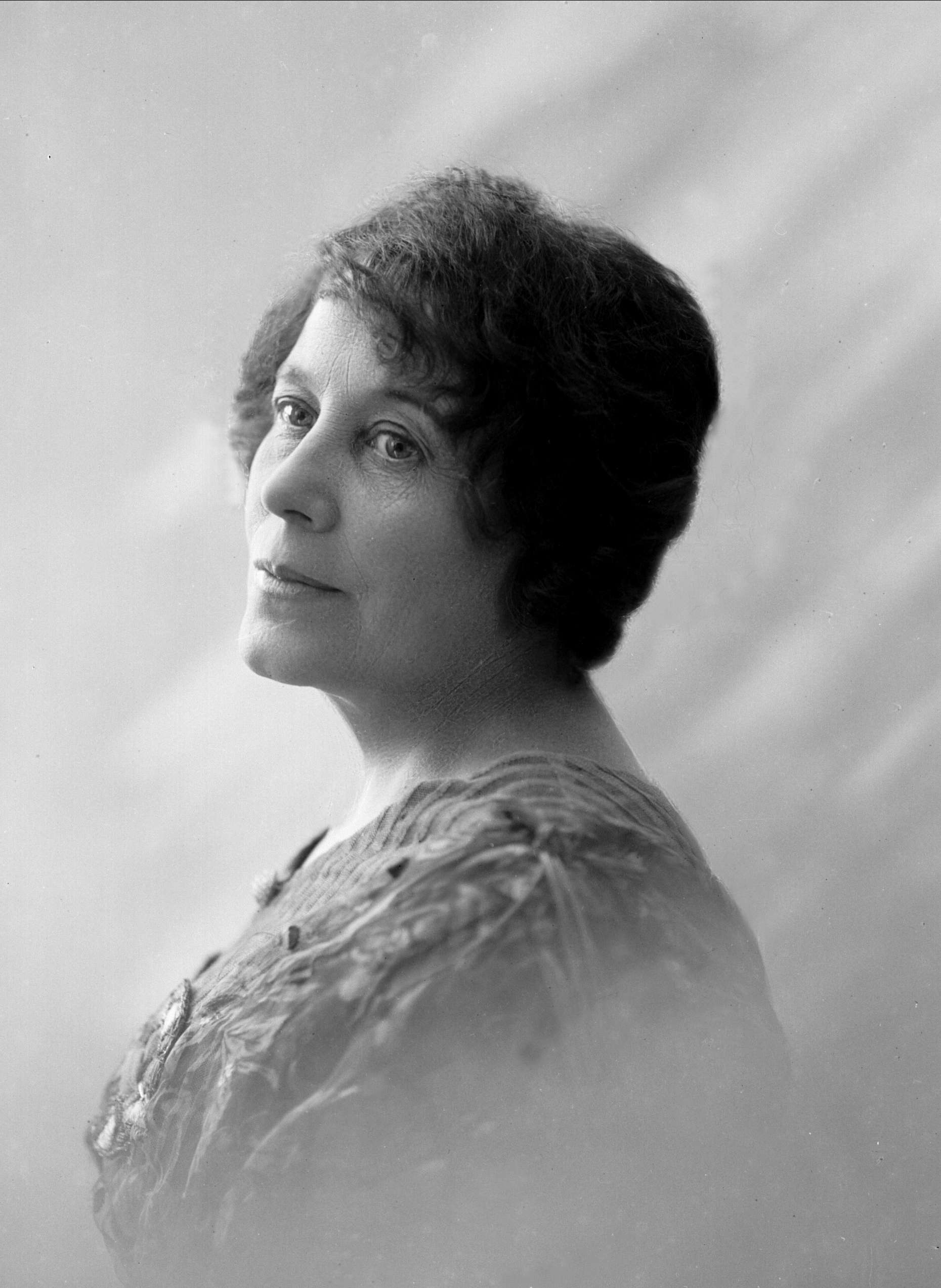
- Born: 19 September 1864; Christiania, Norway
- Died: 27 June 1958 (aged 93)
- Occupation: Actress

Ragna Wettergreen (19 September 1864 – 27 June 1958) was a Norwegian actress.

== Biography ==
Ragna Wettergreen was born in Christiania (now Oslo), Norway. She was the daughter of Olaus Olsen and Inger Marie Rynning Kristianisen. She was the sister of the actress Marta Frogg and the aunt of the actor Odd Frogg. In 1889 she married the defense attorney Haakon Ingolf Wettergreen (1858–1902). She married a second time in 1903, to the artillery captain Roald Skancke (1876–1932).

She made her stage début at Christiania Theatre in 1886. She performed at Christiania Theatre until it closed in 1899, and from then mainly at Nationaltheatret. For the 1905 to 1909 seasons, she was at the Fahlstrøm Theater.

She is particularly known for several title roles or principal characters in plays by Henrik Ibsen, such as Lady Inger of Ostrat, Hedda Gabler, The Vikings at Helgeland, Rosmersholm, John Gabriel Borkman, Little Eyolf, and The Wild Duck. She also participated in films, first in 1912, in the Danish film Historien om en moder and later in the 1915 film Madame de Thèbes, where she played the titular character Madame de Thèbes.
