= Dan Folke =

Danish composer and theater director (1906–1954)

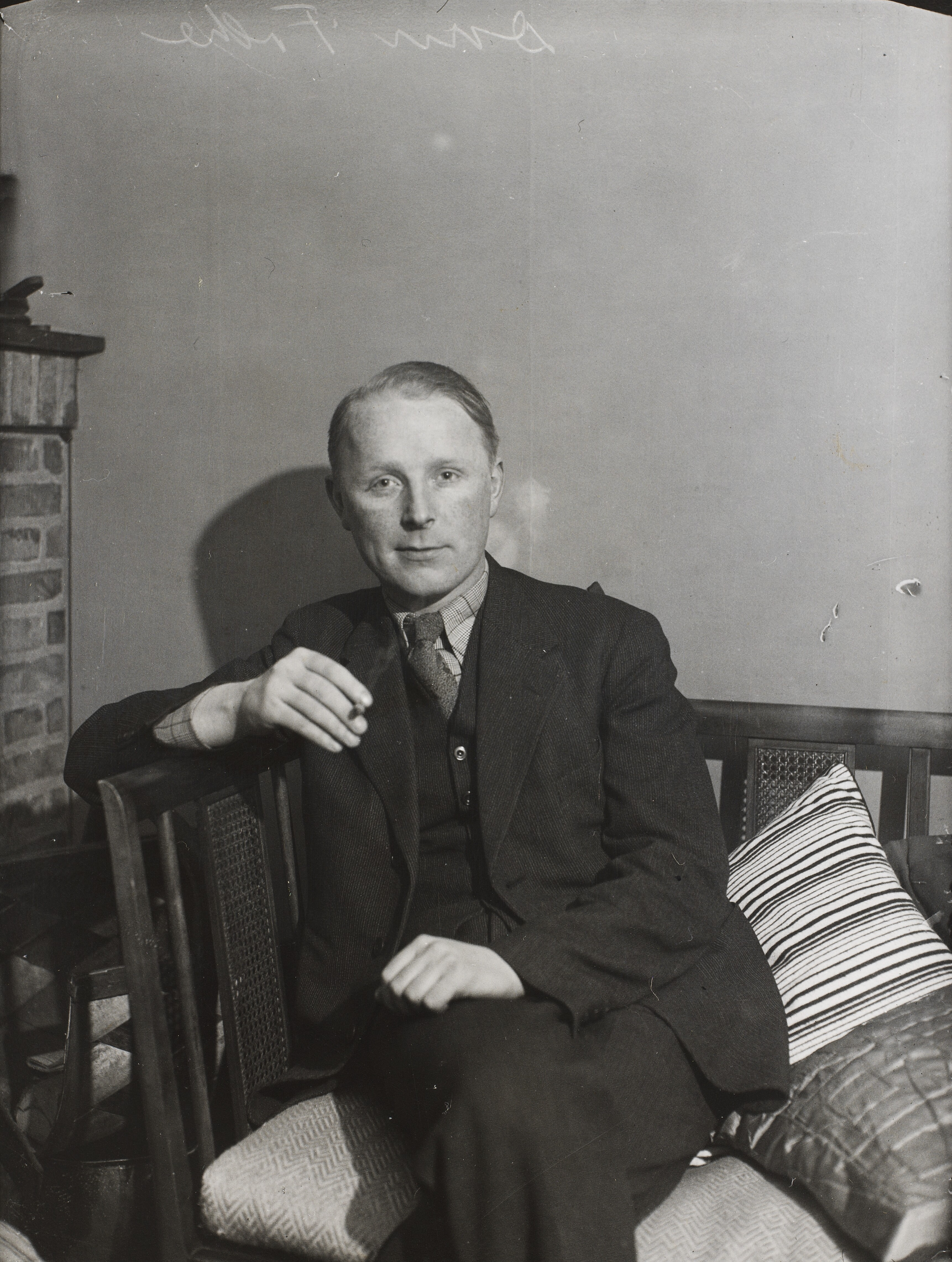
- Dan Folke
- Born: March 11, 1906; Frederiksberg, Denmark
- Died: September 16, 1954 (aged 48); Copenhagen, Denmark
- Occupations: Composer, theater director, magazine editor

Dan Folke (March 11, 1906 – September 16, 1954) was a Danish composer, lyricist, publisher, and theater director.

== Biography ==
Folke was born in Frederiksberg. He enrolled at Frederiksberg High School in 1924, by which time he had already written several melodies for the Copenhagen revues Scala Revyen, Co-Optimisterne, and the Apollo Theater. He became a bookseller's apprentice at C.A. Reitzels Forlag and was employed there until 1928. After his apprenticeship, in 1928 he started working for Wilhelm Hansen, where he remained until 1936. For two seasons, 1936 and 1937, Folke was the director of the Bellevue Theater, and he then returned to Reitzels Forlag in 1938–1939, this time as the director. In 1939 he was employed as a proxy at companies under the Egmont H. Petersen Fund (now Egmont Group), and in 1942 became its director. At Egmont, it was especially magazine publication that he was responsible for, and it was Folke who, among other things, introduced Reader's Digest and Disney comics (1948) to the Danish market.

Together with Arvid and Børge Müller, Folke wrote the lyrics for "Glemmer du" and "Gå med i lunde."

Folke disappeared from his home in Hellerup, Copenhagen on September 10, 1954, and his body was found six days later in Svanemølle Bay.
