= Ole Jonny Eikefjord =

Norwegian chef

Ole Jonny Eikefjord (born 21 September 1970 in Førde) is a Norwegian chef, cookbook author and restaurateur. Together with businessman Petter Stordalen he owns restaurants Restaurant Eik, Restaurant Eik Annen Etage, Restaurant Fjord, Bella Bambina, Rodins, Teatro and Teatro Terrasse. Eikefjord has also been a regular chef on TV2's popular program Sommertid, and made the wedding dinner for the Norwegian Crown Prince couple's wedding on 25 August 2001.

== Career ==
Eikefjord comes from Førde in Sogn og Fjordane. He started his career as a chef at Sunnfjord hotel where he rose through the ranks from apprentice to head chef. He then became head chef at the Hotel Continental in Oslo where he was "discovered" by Petter Stordalen. Together they opened Restaurant Eik who has received an "bib gourmand» from the Michelin Guide nine times, 2013 included, and became the start of a range of restaurant ventures.

== Restaurant ventures ==
- Restaurant Eik - Located on the corner of Hotel Savoy, across the street from the National Gallery. Open kitchen and art on the walls. Recommended in the Michelin Guide's BibGourmand category for "very good food at moderate prices». Got a «one glass» rating for the quality and depth of its wine list by the Wine Spectator in 2013.
- Restaurant Eik Annen Etage - Located in the historic Hotel Continental. Fine dining restaurant in plush, yet innovative surroundings with a bar area open to everyone. Got a «two glass» rating for the quality and depth of its wine list by the Wine Spectator in 2013.
- Restaurant Fjord - Located on the corner of Hotel Savoy, across the street from the National Gallery. Offers varieties of fish in all forms according to seasonal availability. Got a «one glass» rating for the quality and depth of its wine list by the Wine Spectator in 2013.
- Bella Bambina - Located at the Oslo Central Station. Italian restaurant, which makes their own pasta.
- Rodins
- Teatro
- Teatro Terrasse

== Corporate social responsibility ==
Eikefjord and investor Petter Stordalen attracted national attention when Restaurant Eik became Norway's first non-smoking restaurant in 2003 - eighteen months before a public smoking ban was introduced. Eikefjord has repeatedly publicly denouncing the use of foie gras. When Justin Bieber visited Oslo in May 2012, the pop star ate a three course lunch followed by hamburger - at Eikefjord's Restaurant Eik Annen Etage.

== Books and wines ==
In 2008 Eikefjord released the critically acclaimed cookbook "Gourmet For The People", which was nominated for Norwegian cookbook of the year. In 2011, he followed up with cookbook "Fisk og Skalldyr - Delikatesser fra mesterkokken». He received top ratings for his red wines, one of them named after himself: "Niepoort Douro OJ Eikefjord".

== Bibliography ==
- "Gourmet for folket" - Cookbook Det Norske Samlaget (2008) ISBN 9788252178043
- "Fisk og skalldyr - Delikatesser fra mesterkokken" - Cookbook Aschehoug (2011) ISBN 9788203239335
