= Balkongen =

Avant-garde theatre in Oslo, Norway

- Interactive map of Balkongen
- Address: Stortingsgata 26; Oslo; Norway
- Coordinates: 59°54′51″N 10°43′59″E

Construction
- Closed: 1930
- Demolished: 1930

Balkongen was an avant-garde theatre in Oslo established in 1927 and disestablished in 1928. Its founder and artistic director was Agnes Mowinckel.
