= Norsk Musikforlag =

Norwegian music publishing company

- Status: Active
- Founded: January 1, 1909
- Country of origin: Norway
- Headquarters location: Oslo
- Key people: Philip Kruse
- Official website: norskmusikkforlag.no

Norsk Musikforlag Aktieselskap is a Norwegian publisher that specializes in music-related publications such as method books and sheet music. It was formed with the merger of the Hals music publishing firm with the firm operated by Carl Warmuth. The company was established on January 1, 1909.
