= Agnes Mowinckel =

Norwegian actress (1875–1963)

- Mowinckel c. 1905
- Born: 25 August 1875; Bergen, Norway
- Died: 1 April 1963 (aged 87); Oslo, Norway
- Occupations: Actress; theatre director
- Years active: 1899–1963
- Spouse: Hans Brecke Blehr (m. 1899; div. 1909)
- Children: 3

Agnes Mowinckel (25 August 1875 – 1 April 1963) was a Norwegian actress and theatre director. Born in Bergen into a distinguished family, she became Norway's first professional stage director. A pioneer in bringing painters to the theatre, she used light as an artistic element, and engaged contemporary composers. She took part in theatrical experiments, worked at small stages in Oslo, and founded her own theatre.

Her first stage production was an adaptation of Wedekind's play Spring Awakening at Intimteatret in 1922; subsequently she worked as stage director for Det Norske Teatret. From 1927 to 1928 she led the avant-garde theatre Balkongen in Oslo. In 1929 she staged the first production at Det Nye Teater. During the 1930s she directed a series of performances at Nationaltheatret and Det Norske Teatret. After World War II, when she was in her seventies, she was involved with the establishment of Studioteatret and Folketeatret; she produced plays for Trøndelag Teater, and a number of plays for Nationaltheatret. She had a masterful and spirited personality, and has been called the mare of Norwegian theatre.

As an actress she was often used in protagonist roles, but rarely had long-term assignments. She made her stage début at the Bergen theatre Den Nationale Scene in 1899, and joined Sekondteatret in its first season, until she got married. After ten years she made a comeback as actress, touring one year with Nationalturneen, and played one season with Trondhjems nationale Scene. She participated in Danish films in the mid-1910s, appeared regularly at Centralteatret from 1916 to 1921, and had a three years assignment as actress for Det Nye Teater from 1928.

== Personal and social life ==
Mowinckel was born in Bergen on 25 August 1875, to a prominent family, with merchant Johan Ernst Mowinckel (1759–1816) being a distinguished forebear. Her parents were Edward Christian Mowinckel, a merchant, and his wife Cornelia Schultz Blydt; she grew up with eight siblings. Her eldest brother Johan Ernst was a merchant and leading politician in Bergen, and served in the Norwegian Parliament for one period. Johan Ernst supported her morally when she chose to embark on a theatrical career, and later helped her financially when needed; he funded her visits to England and Paris. Her brother Harald had taken over the family firm, one of Norway's largest fish exporters. Her sister Johanne Vogt was among the first women who met in the Norwegian Parliament (as a suppleant for Henrik Ameln).

She was a second cousin of Prime Minister Johan Ludwig Mowinckel, and a sister-in-law of the theatre critics Gunnar Heiberg and Sigurd Bødtker. From 1899 to 1909 she was married to ship broker Hans Brecke Blehr, and had three children with him until they divorced. She later became a close friend of her brother-in-law Sigurd Bødtker, after the latter's divorce from Blehr's sister in 1910; they eventually lived together.

In 1917 she bought a summer house at the island Hvasser. The place was called "Abergeldie", from a name plate found on the beach and mounted above the outer door. An annex called "Sivertstua" was raised and came to be Sigurd Bødtker's residence. Her house at Hvasser was regularly visited by her friends, becoming a meeting place for painters and writers.

== Career ==
=== Early years ===
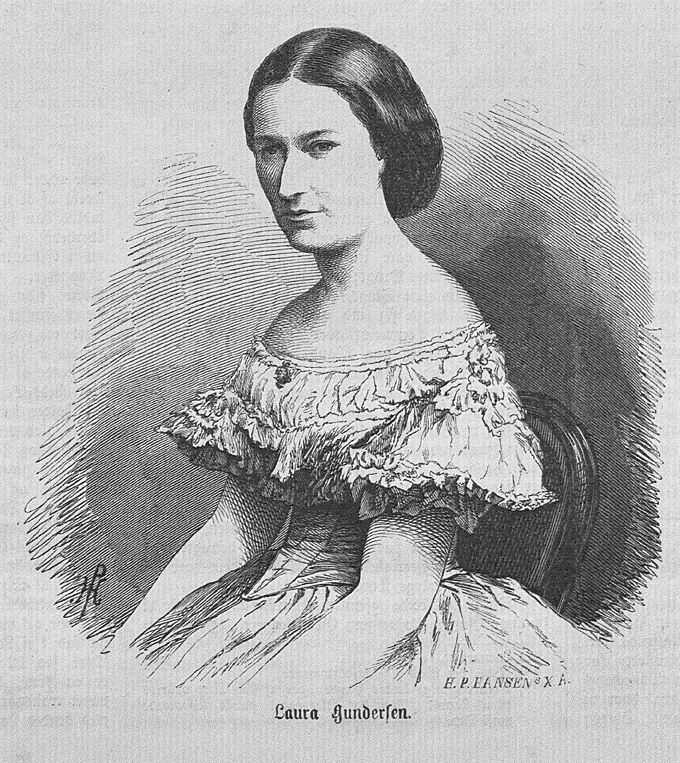
Actress Laura Gundersen had an early influence on Agnes Mowinckel's career.

In 1894, aged nineteen, Agnes Mowinckel travelled to Kristiana to take classes in drawing at Den kgl. Tegneskole. In Kristiania she befriended Laura Gundersen, the leading actress at Christiania Theatre at the time. She visited her and her husband Sigvard Gundersen's home several days a week, and helped with the study of plays. Mowinckel's friend from Bergen, Hans Blehr, was also in Kristiania. Together with him she visited the cafés of the city, joining the circle of artists, many of whom later came to be part of her social network. Having spent one year in Kristiania, Mowinckel returned to Bergen. Back in Bergen she worked as a teacher at a girls' school; she also took lessons with instructor Ludovica Levy at Den Nationale Scene. She made her stage début at Den Nationale Scene on 2 January 1899, as "Anna Hielm" in Heiberg's play Kong Midas. Her second début was as "Hjørdis" in Ibsen's Hærmendene paa Helgeland. She was offered a position at Den Nationale Scene in Bergen, but chose to join Ludovica Levy at her Sekondteater in Kristiania. At Sekondteatret's first performance in August 1899 she played the character "Mary Stuart" in Schiller's play of the same name. In October she played "Anna Hielm" in Kong Midas in Kristiania. In October 1899, Mowinckel married Hans Blehr, a shipbroker a few months her senior. They had two children: Hans (born in June 1900) and Karen Lisbeth (born in October 1901). Blehr's house at Lysaker, a large house with several servants, became a meeting place for painters and writers, with Mowinckel-Blehr as hostess. Among her friends were the writers Sigurd Bødtker, Sven Elvestad, Olaf Bull, Nils Kjær and Nils Collett Vogt, and the painters Christian and Oda Krohg. Her first appearance at Nationaltheatret was in 1902, in a few performances when she replaced Ragna Wettergreen in the title role in Ibsen's Fru Inger til Østeraad.

=== Comeback in 1909 ===
In 1909, after ten years as a mother and housewife, Mowinckel separated from Blehr. Finding herself in a situation with no place to live, no money and no job, and with three small children, Mowinckel joined the touring theatre Nationalturneen for the 1909/1910 season, as an actress and also as responsible for the costumes. Here she played the lead character "Alaine de l'Estaile" in Michaëlis' play Revolusjonsbryllup (Danish: Revolutionsbryllup), and her interpretation of the character "Mrs. Hertz" in Nathansen's play Daniel Hertz was well received by the critics. She was among the first staff at Trondhjems nationale Scene from 1911, and stayed in Trondheim for one season. At the opening performance she played the character "Borghild" in Bjørnson's Sigurd Jorsalfar, and in Ibsen's Fruen fra havet she played the character "Elida Wangel". She also played the character "Elida" at Den Nationale Scene in Bergen in 1912. In 1912 she visited London and Paris, visits that were influential for her later role as stage director. In London she fell under the spell of Gordon Craig, admiring his theories on theatrical design, such as stage composition and use of light. In Paris she was particularly inspired by Charles Dullin, and his way of interweaving drama with music and painting. In the 1910s she participated in a few Danish films. One of these was the short film Proletargeniet from 1914, where she played the wife of a professor. It is assumed that she participated in three or four films, but details about the other films appear to be lost.

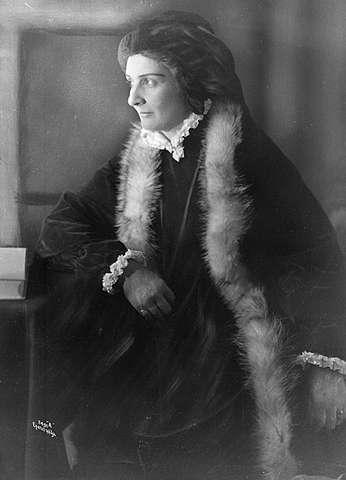
Mowinckel as Lady Inger, 1921

When she returned to Kristiania and found a home at Elisenbergveien she still had contact with her social network. Her home was open for family and friends. Among the visitors were theatre critic Sigurd Bødtker, who eventually moved in with her, Olaf Bull, Nils Kjær, Helge Krog, Ronald Fangen, Sigurd Hoel, Nini Roll Anker, Oda Krohg, Hulda Garborg, Sigrid Undset, Jens Thiis and Sven Elvestad. The group regularly met at the restaurant Anden Etage at Hotel Continental. She was always carefully dressed, often with self-designed costumes and hats.

At Centralteatret in 1916 she played the title character in Jan Fabricius' play Fru Ynske, and the character "Rosa Mamai" in Daudet's play L'Arlésienne. In 1917 she played the character "Anna Hielm" at Centralteatret, in Kong Midas. Her interpretation of "Mrs. Alving" in Ibsen's Ghosts at Centralteatret in 1919 was praised by the critics. The 1924 edition of the encyclopedia Salmonsens Konversationsleksikon mentions "Mrs. Alving" among her best roles. In 1921, her performance of the title character in Ibsen's Fru Inger til Østeraad at Centralteatret was a popular success, garnering praise in critical reviews.

=== Stage director from 1922 ===
In 1922 Mowinckel staged an adaptation of Wedekind's play Spring Awakening at Intimteatret. The performance was well received by the public, with standing ovations. This was the first time Munch's paintings were used at a Norwegian stage. In a retrospective article from 1939 Anton Rønneberg characterized this event as an important day in the history of Norwegian theatre. He pointed at her artistic eye for the stage setting, and for the harmony between stage decorations, costumes, light and choreography.

Mowinckel produced a total of 28 plays for Det Norske Teatret. Johan Borgen acknowledged Mowinckel particularly for her introduction of recent European drama to Det Norske Teatret. Her first production was Myrkemakti (Russian: Власть тьмы) by Tolstoi in February 1923, after which she was appointed as stage instructor for Det Norske Teatret for a period of two years. She produced Lagerlöf's play Keisaren av Portugalia in April 1923, Lenormand's play Raudtind (French: La dent rouge) in October, and Skjoldborg's Mikkel Larsen-gutane in October 1923. Her direction of Tu's comedy Kjærleik på Lykteland in December 1923 came to be one of the greatest box-office successes at the theatre. In January 1924 she played the title role in Ibsen's Fru Inger til Østeraad. In March of the same year she produced Rytter's Herman Ravn, in April Ørjasæter's début play Jo Gjende, and in October Čapek's R.U.R.. In November 1924 she both produced and played the main character in Nexö's Dangardsfolket. In 1924 Mowinckel staged Crommelynck's play Den praktfulde hanrei (in French: Le cocu magnifique) at Det Frie Teater. This was actress Tore Løkkeberg's first sensation, when she played the character "Stella", exposing her bare breast. In February 1925 she produced Gullvåg's historical play Den lange notti for Det Norske Teatret.

=== Nationaltheatret 1925–1926 ===
In 1925 Mowinckel was contracted by theatre director Bjørnson as a permanent stage director for Nationaltheatret. This decision was apparently not popular among the veteran actors. Her first production was a success, an adaptation of Vane's play Outward Bound (translated as Norwegian: Til ukjent havn), staged in September 1925. Her next effort turned into a disaster, when she was asked to stage Ibsen's play Little Eyolf, and primadonna Johanne Dybwad, who played one of the roles, refused to cooperate. The play was then dropped from the repertoire. In January 1926 she staged Bergman's Swedenhielms, and in March 1926 Christiansen's Edmund Jahr. Her production of Shaw's play Jeanne d'Arc in November 1926, in which opera singer Cally Monrad played the title role, was not as successful as expected. In the aftermath, influential staff members at the theatre blamed Mowinckel for the debacle, and asked theatre director Bjørnson to dismiss her from her position as stage director. Mowinckel was allowed leave the same day, and released from her contract for the next season. Bjørnson himself resigned from his position a half year later. It would be seven years before she gained her next assignment for Nationaltheatret.

=== Theatre director at Balkongen 1927–1928 ===
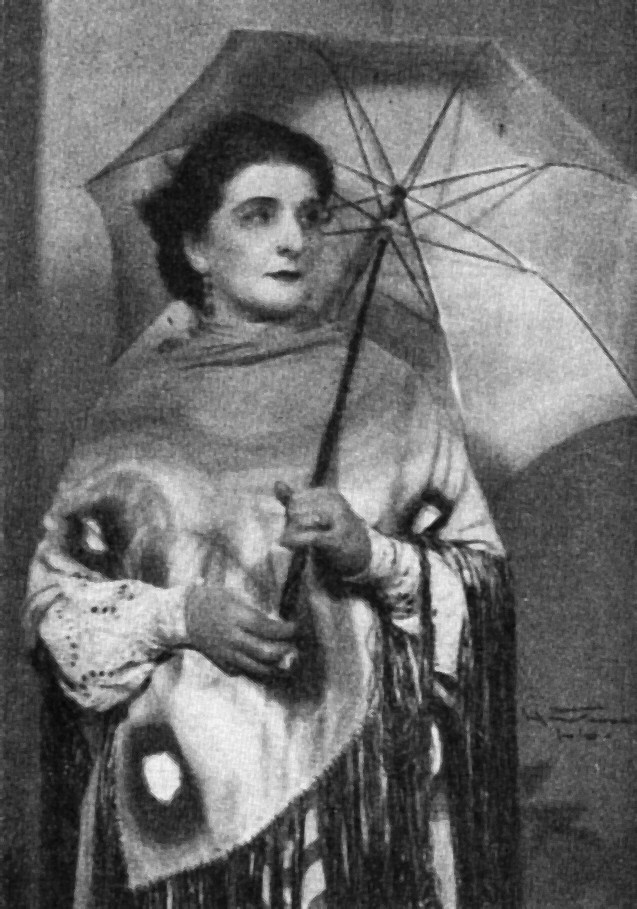
Mowinckel as Ellida Wangel in Ibsen's The Lady from the Sea at Balkongen, 1928

After the incidents at Nationaltheatret Mowinckel started her own theatre in 1927, called Balkongen. It was located in Brødrene Hals' old concert hall, which had formerly been used by the revue theatre Chat Noir. The first production was Aleichem's play Hevnens gud. Other productions were Langer's play Periferi (Czech: Periferie, in English: The Outskirts), Kaus' play Toni, Ansky's Dybuk, Ibsen's Fruen fra havet, and the first stage production of Obstfelder's De røde draaber.

=== Late 1920s and 1930s ===
Mowinckel played "Lady Inger" at Centralteatret for the Ibsen jubilée in 1928. In May 1928 she produced Vesaas' play Frå fest til fest for Det Norske Teatret, and O'Casey's Plogen og stjernone in September 1929. She played the male character "Thy" in Hamsun's Livets Spill at the opening performance at Det Nye Teater in February 1929, and directed and played in Ibsen's Et dukkehjem for Det Nye Teater in 1929. In 1931 she staged Stuart's comedy Fra ni til seks at Centralteatret. At Det Norske Teatret in March 1931 she staged an adaptation of Frank's Carl and Anna, in October O'Neill's Alle Guds born har vengjer, and in November 1931 Soini's Syndebukken. In February 1932 she produced Braaten's adaptation of Zuckmayer's play Der Hauptmann von Köpenick. As advertising they let German "soldiers" patrol the streets, which led to official protests from the German Embassy in Oslo. In May 1932 she produced Martinez Sierra's play Dei spanske nonnone (Spanish: Canción de Cuna), in September Langer's Kamelen gjennom nålauga (Czech: Velbloub uchem jehly, in English: The Camel through the Needle's Eye), and in October 1932 Drabløs' adaptation of Falkberget's Eli Sjursdotter. In February 1933 she produced Glebov's Under Sovjet, and in December Ørjasæter's Anne på Torp. In 1933 she staged Gjesdahl's adaptation of Winsloe's play Gestern und heute at Det Nye Teater, a performance which made a strong impression on the public.

Mowinckel's next commission for Nationaltheatret after the incident in 1927 was her production of Oneill's comedy Ah, Wilderness! (in Norwegian: Skjønne ungdom) in March 1934. This was the first European production of the comedy. From then she more or less regularly guested the theatre. Among her productions are Ibsen's John Gabriel Borkman and Rosmersholm, Bjørnson's Paul Lange og Tora Parsberg, Skram's Agnete, and plays by Pirandello, Borgen, Grieg and Abell In April 1935 she produced Gorky's Jegor Bulytsjov at Det Norske Teatret, the first staged production of this play outside the Soviet Union, and in October 1935 she produced Hoprekstad's historical comedy Jarlen. She played the title character in Munk's play Diktatorinnen at Nationaltheatret in 1939.

=== Second World War ===
In January 1941 Mowinckel staged Ørjasæter's play Jo Gjende at Det Norske Teatret. She played the character "Merete Beyer" in Wiers-Jenssen's play Anne Pedersdotter at Nationaltheatret in February 1941. She staged Kielland's comedy Tre Par for Nationaltheatret in April 1941. Tre par was the last performance before the Nazi authorities took over the management of Nationaltheatret. In January 1942 she produced Wessel's Kiærlighed uden strømper and in February Wiers-Jenssen's Anne Pedersdotter for Trøndelag Teater. In October 1942 she staged Kinck's play Agilulf den vise at the Det Norske Teatret, the last production before theatre director Hergel fled the country to escape the German occupation.

=== Post war period ===
In 1945 Mowinckel helped Jens Bolling with preparations for Studioteatret's first production, an adaptation of Wilder's play The Long Christmas Dinner, but she did not want to be credited. The play premiered in Oslo on 15 June 1945, attracting critical praise. In October 1945 she produced Ibsen's Fru Inger til Østeraad for Trøndelag Teater, the theatre's first production after the occupation of Norway by Nazi Germany. The opening performance was held on 2 October, and Mowinckel also played the character "Inger Gyldenløve". On 6 October a memorial performance was held in memory of Henry Gleditsch, with the presence of the Crown Prince, the Crown Princess and family members of victims from the extrajudicial executions in 1942. Mowinckel contributed by reading Grieg's poem "Årsdagen". In February 1946 she directed Wilder's play Our Town for Studioteatret, garnering plaudits both from the critics and the public. During the summer 1946 the theatre toured Northern Troms and Finnmark, which had been severely damaged during the war, and they played Our Town at 26 different sites. In May 1947 Mowinckel staged Sartre's play The Respectful Prostitute for Studioteatret, with Merete Skavlan as a successful prostitute "Lizzie". She played the character "Bernanda" in an adaptation of Lorca's La casa de Bernarda Alba in 1947, staged by Gerda Ring. In December 1948 she staged Abell's play Dager på en sky at Nationaltheatret, and also played the character "Hera". In January 1949 she directed Strindberg's Dødsdansen at Det Norske Teatret. When she was in her 75th year she played the character "Thalia" in Abell's Dronning går igjen at Nationaltheatret, a play written specifically for her. A gala performance was held for her on 1 December, as a late celebration of her 50th anniversary as actress. In May 1950 she staged Ibsen's Kongsemnerne for Oslo's millennium celebration. She staged Eliot's play Cocktail Party at Nationaltheatret in April 1951, and Shaw's play Caesar and Cleopatra in November 1951. She directed the opening performance at Folketeatret in 1952, Heiberg's play Tante Ulrikke. In May 1953 she staged Schiller's Maria Stuart at Nationaltheatret, at a gala performance for the official visit by Queen Juliana of the Netherlands. She staged the first production of Stenersen's Eva og Johannes at Nationaltheatret in November 1953. In September 1954 she staged Ibsen's En Folkefiende at Trøndelag Teater. In January 1955 Havrevold's new play Uretten was staged by Mowinckel at Nationaltheatret, and the play resulted in a fierce debate on women's rights. In May 1956 she produced Ibsen's play Lille Eyolf. Her last stage appearance was in 1963, when she performed as the aging "Camilla Collett" at Oslo Nye Teater.

== Legacy ==
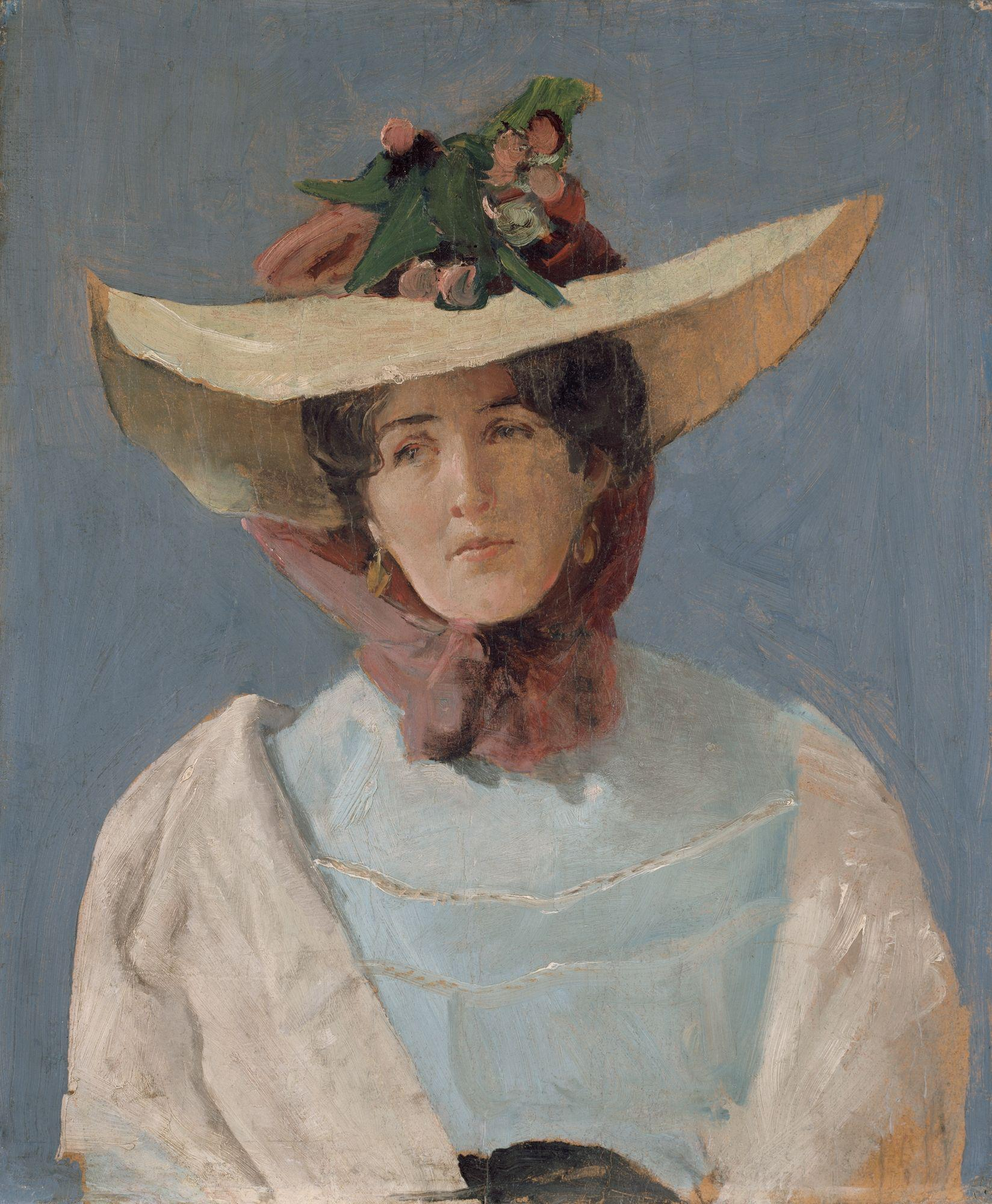
"Portrait of Actress Agnes Mowinckel" (1904), by Christian Krohg

Several artists created portraits of Mowinckel that are on public display. In the Theatercafeen in Oslo a portrait by Henrik Lund once hung on the wall beside the entrance, but it was later moved to a less prominent position. A Christian Krohg portrait is located in the National Museum of Art, Architecture and Design. Henrik Sørensen's painting is at Den Nationale Scene in Bergen, and a portrait by Kai Fjell is located at Nationaltheatret.

Mowinckel's temperament was often fiery, earning her nicknames such as the "Volcano", "Storm centre", "Eagle" or "Natural disaster". The painter and theatre worker Ferdinand Finne called her the "mare of Norwegian theatre" (Note: Norwegian: Norsk teaters mare gjennom hundre år. Lyche 1990: p. 6) Her biographer Lise Lyche used this phrase as the title of her book, Norsk teaters mare, published in 1990.

Mowinckel received the artists' scholarship (Norwegian: Statens Kunstnerlønn) from 1945, and was an Honorary member of the Norwegian Actors' Equity Association from 1948. She is buried at the honorary cemetery Æreslunden at Vår Frelsers gravlund in Oslo.
