= Odd Frogg =

Norwegian actor (1901–1934)

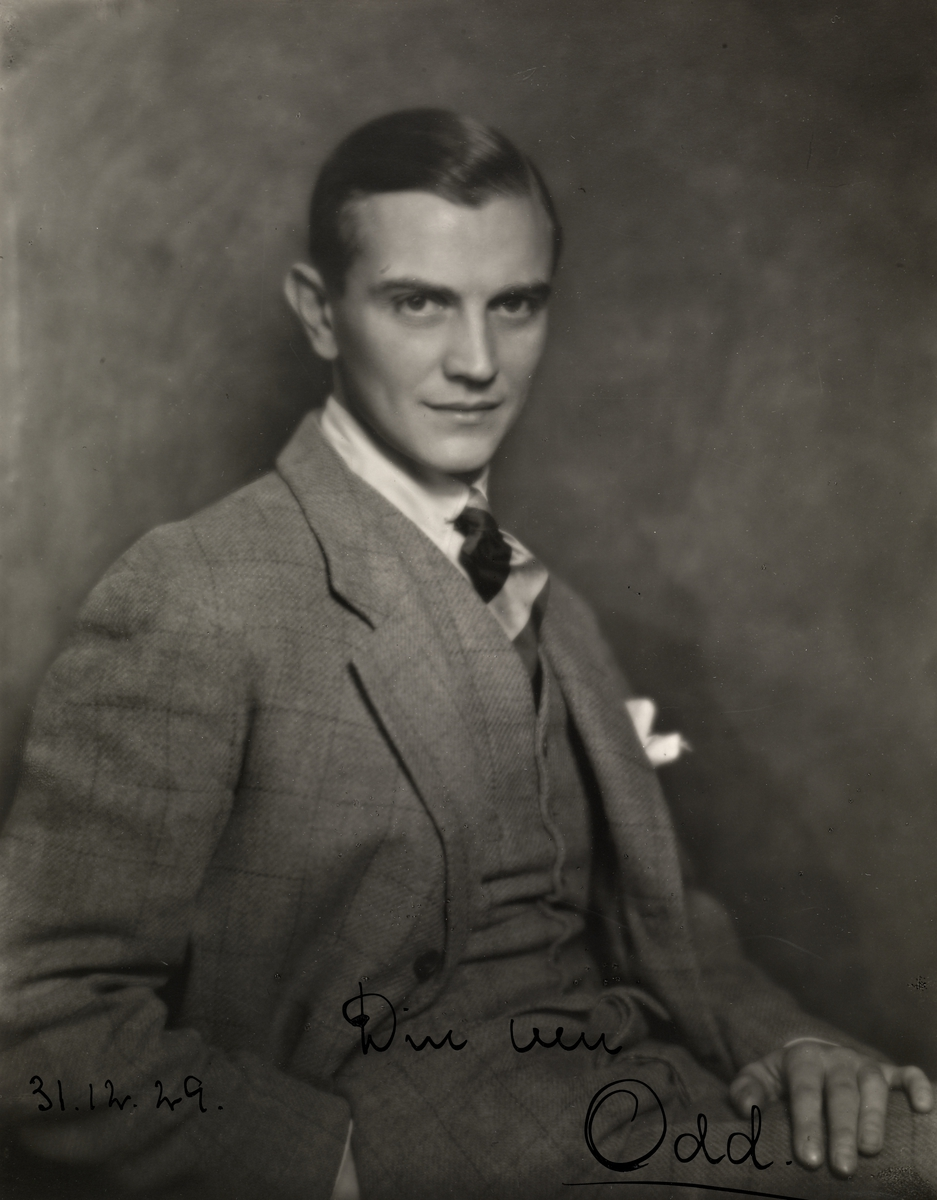
- Born: October 13, 1901; Hønefoss, Norway
- Died: February 23, 1934 (aged 32); Oslo, Norway
- Occupation: Actor
- Spouse: Else Thaulow
- Mother: Marta Frogg

Odd Frogg (October 13, 1901 – February 23, 1934) was a Norwegian actor.

== Career ==
Frogg attended Frogner School, where his classmates included Johan Borgen. In 1921, the two friends approached Halfdan Christensen, who was manager at the National Theater in Oslo, to be employed as actors in the ensemble. Frogg made a positive impression, and he debuted in the role of the priest's son Benedikt in Nini Roll Anker's Kirken in the spring of 1921, while Borgen went on to study law. Later, Frogg confirmed his lyrical talent as the young priest Peter in Henrik Ibsen's drama The Pretenders at the same theater, in the title role as Ambrosius Stub in the Central Theater's production of Ambrosius by Christian Molbech, and as the young writer Falk in Ibsen's Love's Comedy at the National Theater in Bergen. He returned to the National Theater in 1928, playing major roles in classical and modern plays.

Together with Alfred Maurstad, he wrote the adventure comedy Askeladden, which was performed at both the National Theater in Oslo and the National Theater in Bergen in 1930.

From 1930 to 1933, Frogg was engaged at the Oslo New Theater, where he performed demanding roles, including the title role in Marius in 1931, a play by the French writer Marcel Pagnol. The following year, the theater staged Pagnol's Fanny, again with Frogg in the role of Marius. He also played Captain Stanhope in the R. C. Sherriff's Journey's End from 1928, about four days in the trenches during the First World War. Back at the National Theater in Oslo, he had the lead role as Dominique in Domino, together with Gerd Egede-Nissen. After the 27th performance, in 1934, he died after falling from the veranda of his apartment on the eighth floor of a dormitory building at Frogner plass. He was dead when he arrived at the hospital. He left behind a slip of paper with the inscription G.E.N.I., which may have stood for Gerd Egede-Nissen Ingebrigtsen.

== Family ==
Odd Frogg was the son of Nicolai Frogg (1866–?) and Marta Frogg (née Martha Rynning Olsen; 1872–1950). His father was a lawyer in Hønefoss; he emigrated to the United States in 1904 and was not heard from after that. His mother was an actress and the sister of the actress Ragna Wettergreen. His sister Ruth Frogg (1897–?) was also an actress.

Frogg married Elizabeth (Else) Thaulow (1903–1968) in 1926. They were the parents of the sculptor and Morgenbladet journalist Lise Frogg (1929–1958), who married the Danish architect Ulf Vejlby. After Odd Frogg's death in 1934, in 1940 his widow married the actor Stein Grieg Halvorsen (1909–2013).

== Filmography ==
- 1932: Fantegutten as Iver, the Gypsy boy
- 1932: Lalla vinner! as Alexander Berg, a journalist
