= Theatercaféen =

Restaurant in Hotel Continental in Oslo, Norway

Coordinates: 59°54′50″N 10°44′03″E

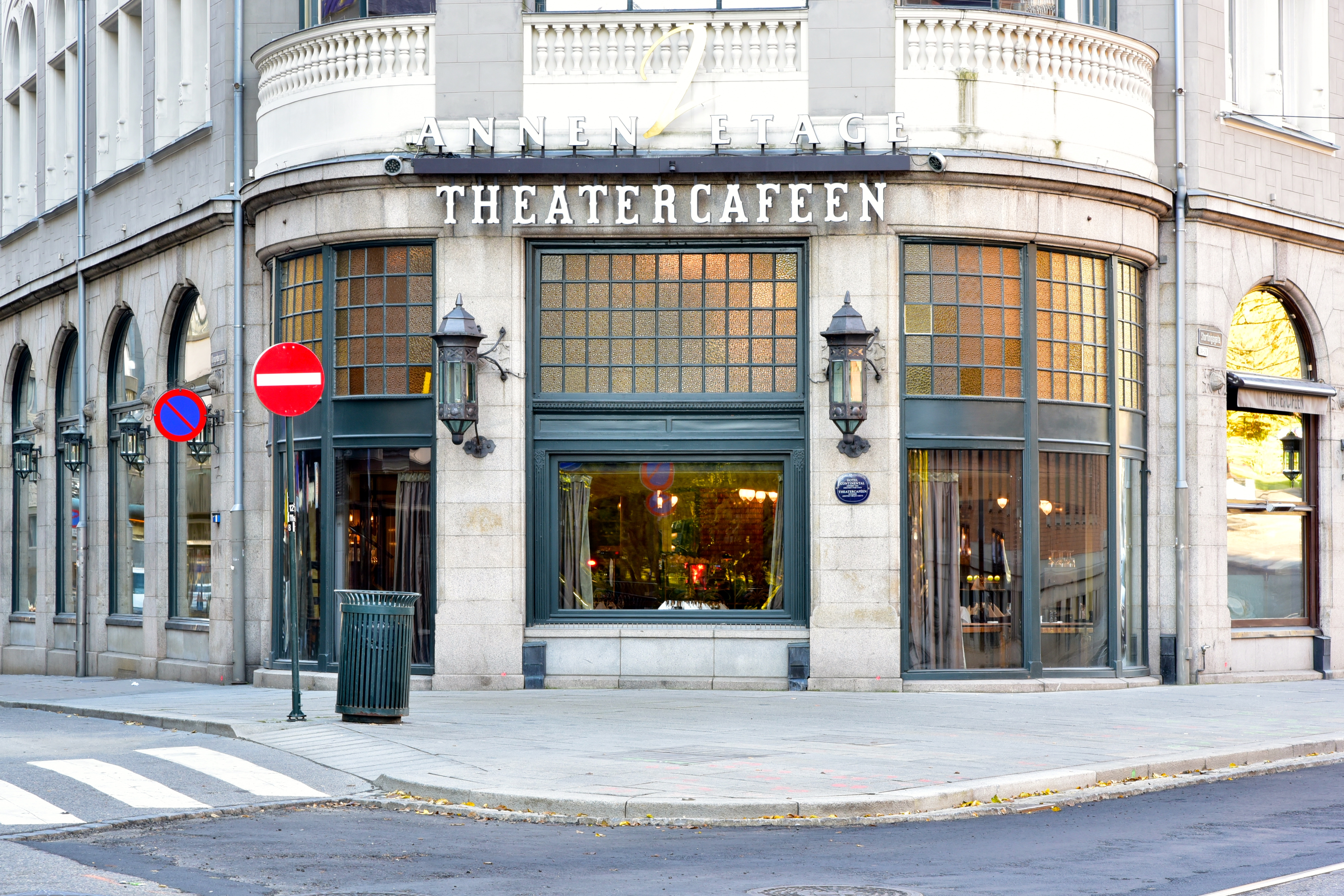
Theatercaféen

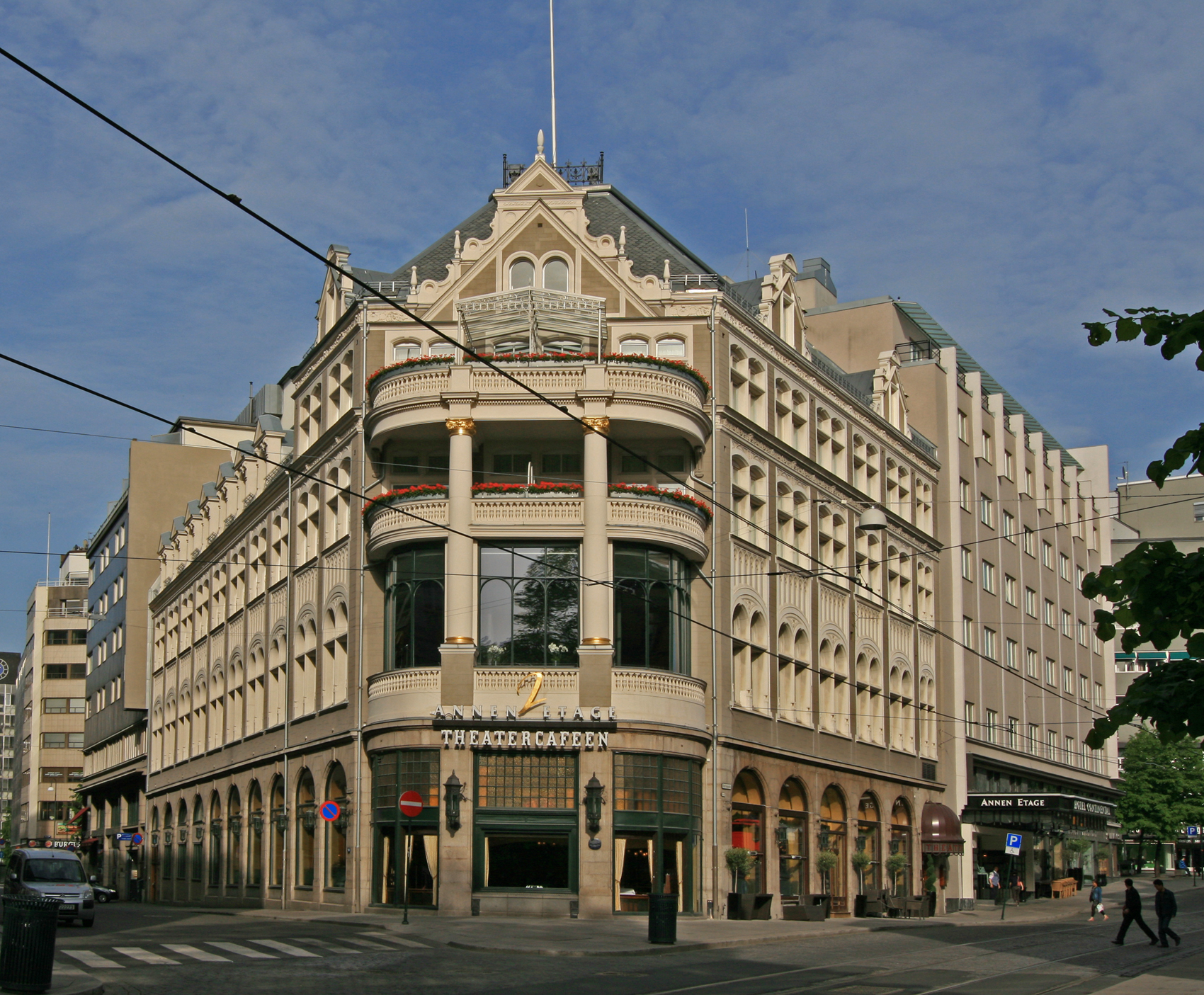
Hotel Continental

Theatercaféen is a restaurant located in the Hotel Continental in Oslo, Norway.

== History ==
Theatercaféen opened in 1900 and is situated opposite from the National Theatre, which had opened the previous year. The restaurant and the hotel was originally owned by the Foss Brewery (Foss Bryggeri). Caroline Boman Hansen (1860–1956) and Christian Boman Hansen (1868–1915) took over the lease in 1909, and within only three years they were able to purchase the establishment. Elisabeth C. Brochmann is the current and fourth generation owner. In 1985, she took over the management from her mother Ellen Brochmann.

Theatercaféen was modernized in 1949, and the restaurant lost some of its distinct ambiance. In 1971, Theatercafeen was again renovated, and this time back to its original Art Nouveau style, under supervision of the architect Hans Gabriel Finne. Parts of the original fixtures and furniture were still intact, and through studies of old photographs it was possible to bring the Theatercafeen back to its original style. Inspiration was also gathered on travels to Paris, Copenhagen, and Stockholm. The floor is made from over 100,000 small pieces of linoleum. The restaurant was again renovated in 2010, and it now features a new bar area and a chambre séparée.

Theatercaféen quickly became the meeting point for influential members of the Norwegian art and culture scene, including Sigurd Bødker, Sven Elvestad, Herman Wildenvey as well as actors and actresses from the National Theatre. Starting in 1924, portraits of such guests were made and placed on the walls of the restaurant. The tradition has continued, and the collection now contains 81 portraits of authors, actors, painters, photographers, musicians, and composers, all former or current patrons of the house.

== Other sources ==
- Ellen Brochmann (1998) Til bords og til veggs i Theatercafeen (Oslo)
- Caspar Brochmann (1986) Mors hus, Hotel Continental – en personlig affære gjennom 75 år (Oslo: Grøndahl )

== Related Literature ==
- Paul Grøtvedt (1991) Caféen med veggene, levende portretter og morsomme døde (Oslo: J.M. Stenersen Forlag) ISBN 9788272011771
- Walter Øverland (1991) Sett og hørt på Theatercaféen (Oslo: Norske forfatteres forlag) ISBN 978-8299079204
