= Hals (company) =

Hals, also known as Brødrene Hals, was a piano manufacturing and music publishing company based in Christiania, Norway (now Oslo) that was active from 1847 through 1925.

== History ==
Hals was founded in November 1847 by brothers Karl Hals (1822–1898) and Petter Hals (1823–1871). The company originally only made upright pianos of various designs. It won medals at world's fairs in 1862, 1866, 1867 and 1900. After Petter died in 1871, Karl purchased his share of the business and became the company's sole owner.

In 1880 Hals opened their own public concert hall which was known for its excellent acoustics. In 1886 the company began building harmoniums in addition to pianos, and in 1887 they expanded into music publishing after acquiring Petter Håkonsen's music publishing business. By 1890 the Hals factory had 100 employees. It became a limited company in 1900.

The music publishing part of Hals ceased operation in 1909 when it merged with Carl Warmuth's music publishing firm to form Norsk Musikforlag. In 1925 the piano manufacturing part of the business was sold and absorbed into Grøndahl & Søn.
