= Hotel Continental, Oslo =

Hotel in Oslo, Norway

Hotel Continental
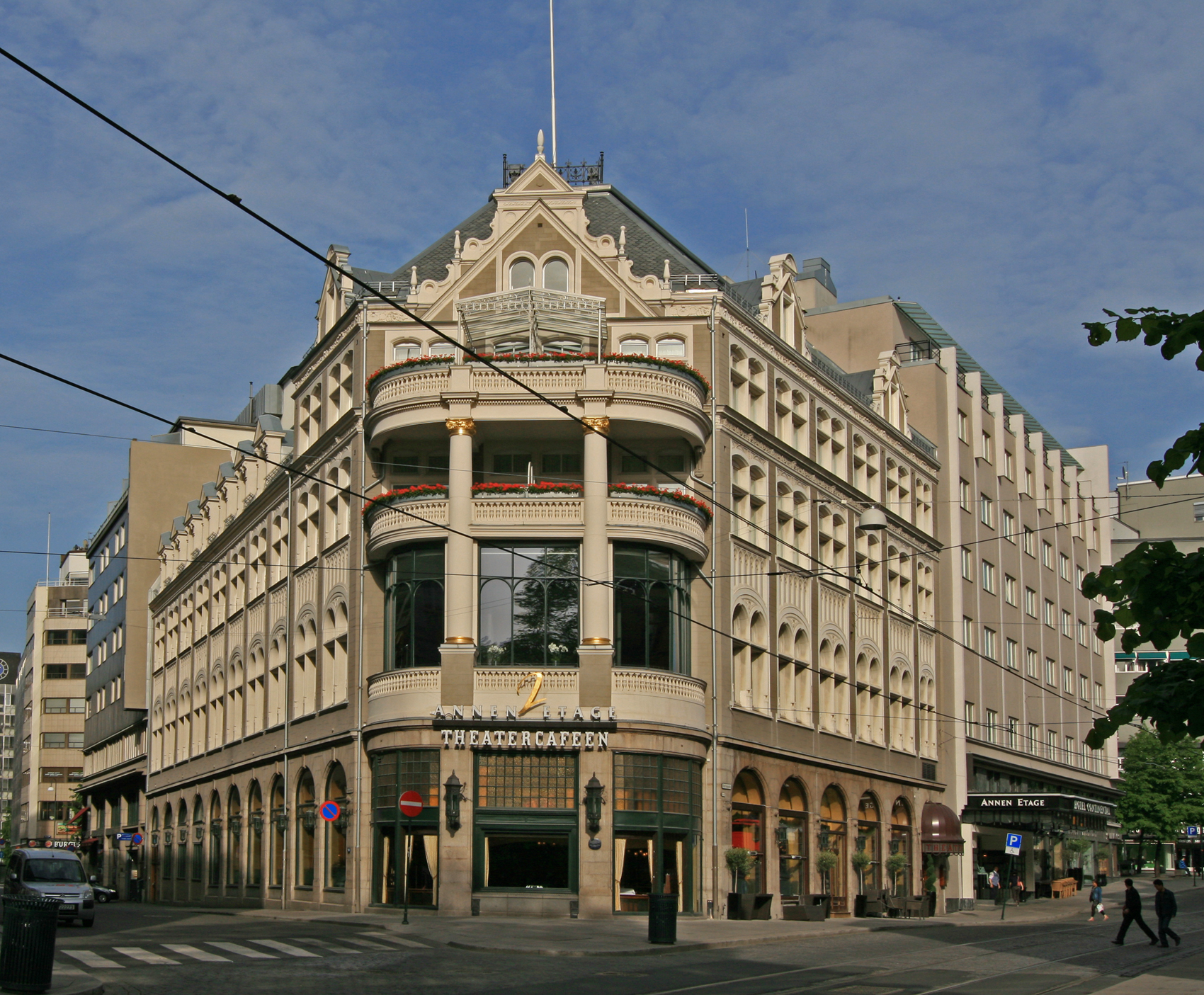
- Hotel Continental and Theatercaféen

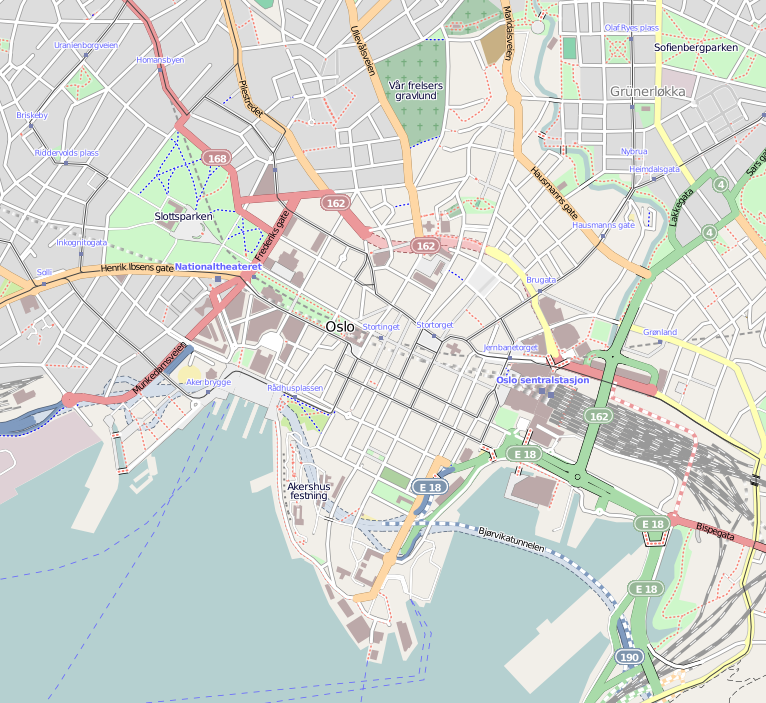
- Location in Oslo

General information
- Coordinates: 59°54′50″N 10°43′59″E
- Opening: 1900

Other information
- Number of rooms: 151

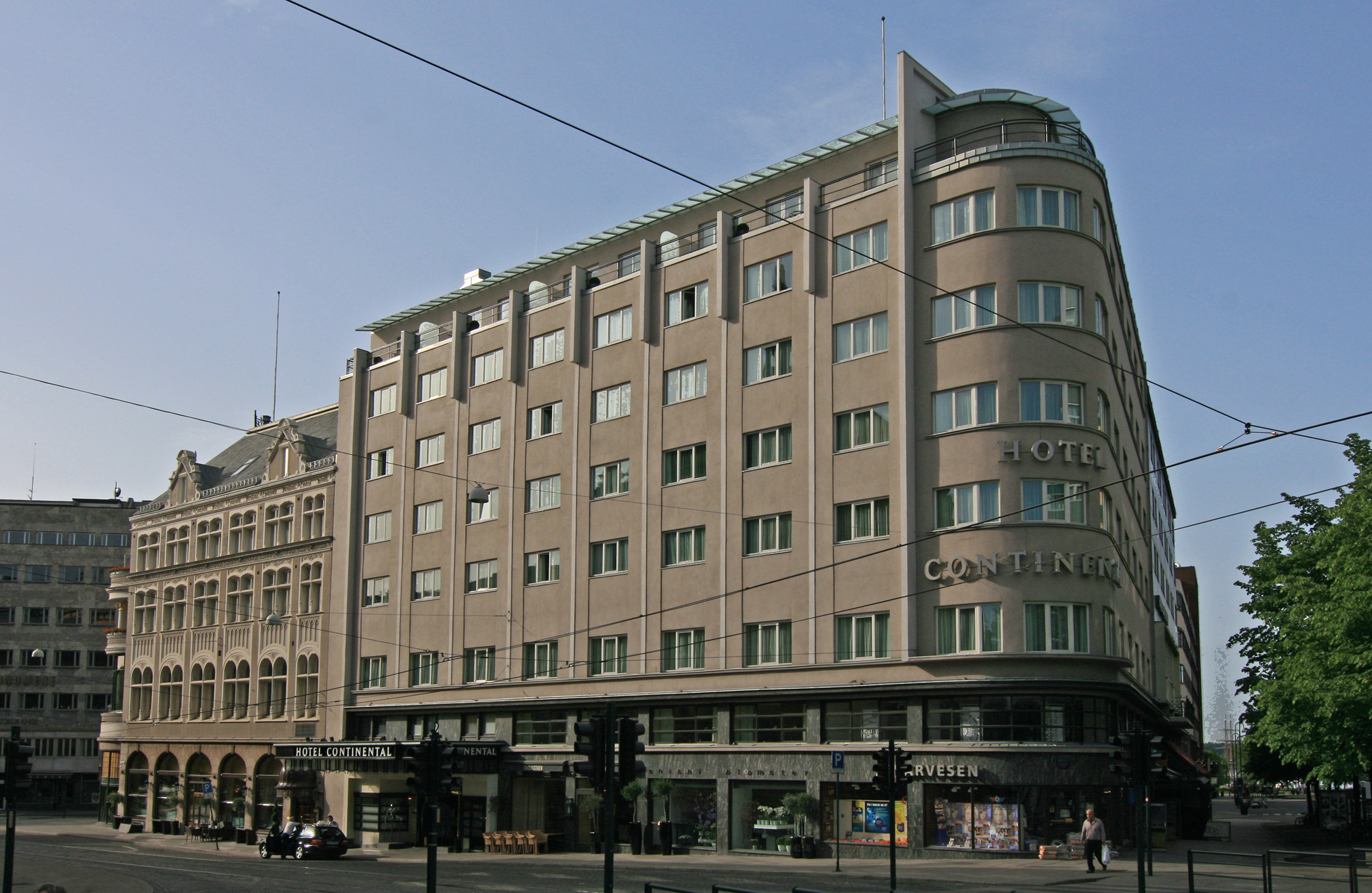
Annex from 1934

Hotel Continental is a hotel located at Stortingsgaten 24–26, in Oslo, Norway. It is situated across the street from the National Theatre.

== History ==
Hotel Continental and Theatercaféen opened in 1900, right after the opening of the National Theatre. The business was originally owned by the Foss Brewery (Foss Bryggeri), but was run by different tenants who all had to give up. Caroline Boman Hansen (1860–1956) and Christian Boman Hansen (1868–1915) took over the lease in 1909, and within only three years they were able to purchase the establishment. In 1932 and 1961, respectively, the hotel and restaurant were expanded, and now occupy a whole block centrally located in the heart of Oslo. Through four generations, the same family has built and developed the hotel and the restaurants into what they are today. Elisabeth C. Brochmann is the fourth-generation and current owner. In 1985, she took over the daily operations from her mother Ellen Brochmann.

The Hotel Continental offers 151 individually furnished rooms, many of which are newly renovated. The hotel is a property of international standards and has been a member of The Leading Hotels of the World since 1975, one of two Norwegian hotels in the group alongside Britannia in Trondheim. In 2025, Hotel Continental received one Michelin Key in the inaugural Michelin Guide Norway hotel awards. In addition, the hotel has conference and banquet facilities with the capacity of up to 300 guests. The restaurant Theatercaféen is part of the establishment. The hotel's gourmet restaurant Eik Annen Etage is run by noted chef Ole Jonny Eikefjord in partnership with investor Petter Stordalen. Hotel Continental has an extensive art collection. In the lobby bar there is a large collection of prints by Edvard Munch.

== Other sources ==
- Ellen Brochmann (1998) Til bords og til veggs i Theatercafeen (Oslo)
- Caspar Brochmann (1986) Mors hus, Hotel Continental – en personlig affære gjennom 75 år (Oslo: Grøndahl )
