= Johan Ernst Mowinckel (born 1860) =

Norwegian politician

- Born: 7 November 1860; Bergen, Norway
- Died: 27 March 1947 (aged 86)
- Occupations: merchant and politician
- Relatives: Agnes Mowinckel (sister)

Johan Ernst Mowinckel (7 November 1860 – 23 March 1947) was a Norwegian merchant and politician from Bergen. He was the great grandson of Johan Ernst Mowinckel (1759–1816), and the brother of actress Agnes Mowinckel.

He established his own company in 1882. He also founded a butter factory, which later became Mowinckels Margarinfabrik. He took part in politics in Bergen, and was a member of the Storting from 1922 to 1924, representing the Conservative Party.
