= Johan Ernst Mowinckel (born 1759) =

Norwegian merchant and consul

- Born: 23 May 1759
- Died: 26 March 1816 (aged 56)
- Occupations: merchant and consul
- Relatives: Johan Ludvig Mowinckel (great grandson); Agnes Mowinckel (great granddaughter)

Johan Ernst Mowinckel (23 May 1759 – 26 March 1816) was a Norwegian merchant and consul from Bergen, and one of the leading persons of the city. He was the great grandfather of Prime minister Johan Ludwig Mowinckel and to actress Agnes Mowinckel. Mowinckel established the grocery Mowinckel & Co. Among the company's business activities was export of fish and import of corn and salt.
