= Works by Andrei Tarkovsky =

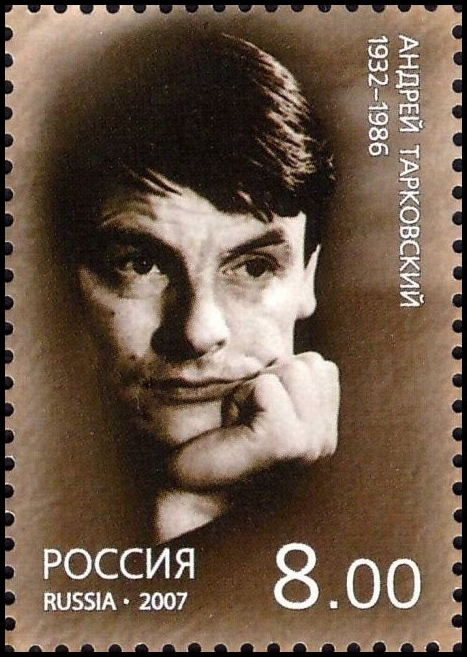
Tarkovsky on a 2007 Russian stamp

Andrei Tarkovsky (1932–1986) was a Soviet filmmaker who is widely regarded as one of the greatest directors of all time. His films are considered Romanticist and are often described as "slow cinema", with the average shot-length in his final three films being over a minute (compared to seconds for most modern films). In his thirty-year career, Tarkovsky directed several student films and seven feature films, co-directed a documentary, and wrote numerous screenplays. He also directed a stage play and wrote a book.

Born in the Soviet Union, Tarkovsky began his career at the State Institute of Cinematography, where he directed several student films. In 1956, he made his directorial debut with the student film The Killers, an adaptation of Ernest Hemingway's eponymous short story. His first feature film was 1962's Ivan's Childhood, considered by some to be his most conventional film. It won the Golden Lion at the Venice Film Festival. In 1966, he directed the biopic Andrei Rublev, which garnered him the International Critics' Prize at the Cannes Film Festival.

In 1972, he directed the science fiction film Solaris, which was a response to what Tarkovsky saw as the "phoniness" of Stanley Kubrick's 2001: A Space Odyssey (1968). Solaris was loosely based on the novel of the same title by Stanislaw Lem and won the Grand Prix at the Cannes Film Festival. His next film was Mirror (1975). In 1976, Tarkovsky directed his only play—a stage production of William Shakespeare's Hamlet at the Lenkom Theatre. Viewing Tarkovsky as a dissident, Soviet authorities shut down the production after only a few performances. His final film produced in the Soviet Union, Stalker (1979), garnered him the Prize of the Ecumenical Jury at Cannes.

Tarkovsky left the Soviet Union in 1979 and directed the film Nostalghia and the accompanying documentary Voyage in Time. At the Cannes Film Festival, Nostalghia was awarded the Prize of the Ecumenical Jury but was blocked from receiving the Palme d'Or by Soviet authorities. In 1985, he published a book, Sculpting in Time, in which he explored art and cinema. His final film, The Sacrifice (1986), was produced in Sweden, shortly before his death from cancer. The film garnered Tarkovsky his second Grand Prix at Cannes, as well as a second International Critics' Prize, a Best Artistic Contribution, and another Prize of the Ecumenical Jury. He was posthumously awarded the Lenin Prize in 1990, the most prestigious award in the Soviet Union.

== Filmography ==
The logo for Solaris (1972)

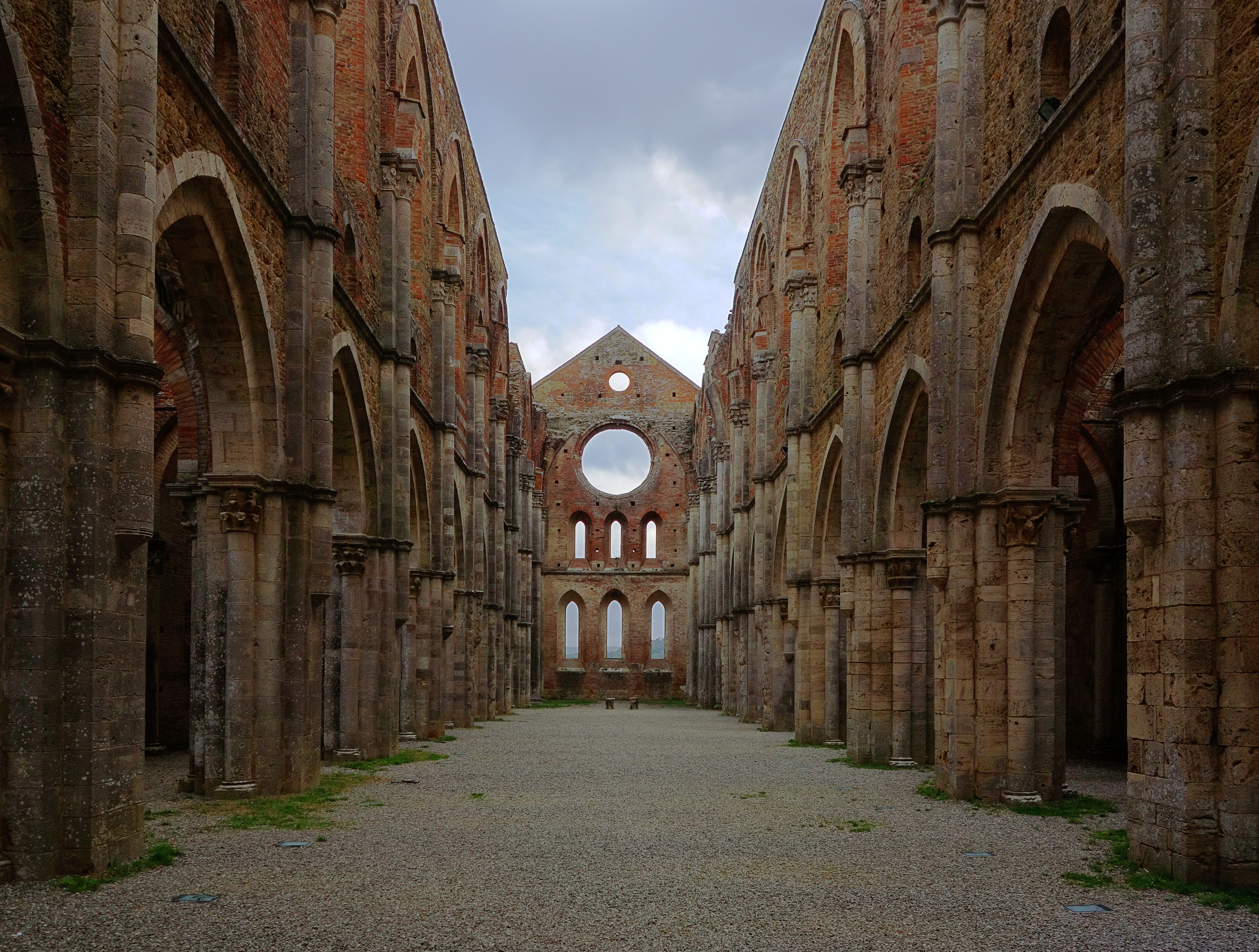
The ruins of the 13-century Abbey of San Galgano were used in the filming of Nostalghia (1983).

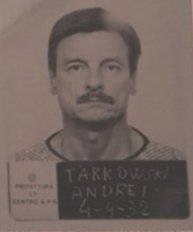
1985 mug shot of Tarkovsky at an Italian refugee camp, after leaving the Soviet Union

Table featuring completed feature films by Andrei Tarkovsky
Year	Title	Credited as		Notes	Ref.
Year	Title	Director	Writer	Notes	Ref.
1956	The Killers	Yes	Yes	Student film, also actor, co-directed with Aleksandr Gordon and Marika Beiku, co-written with Gordon	
1959	There Will Be No Leave Today	Yes	Yes	Student film, co-directed with Aleksandr Gordon, co-written with Gordon and Irina Makhovaya	
1960	The Steamroller and the Violin	Yes	Yes	Student film	
1962	Ivan's Childhood	Yes	No		
1966	Andrei Rublev	Yes	Yes		
1968	Sergey Lazo	No	Yes	Also an uncredited acting role	
1969	One Chance in One Thousand	No	Yes	Co-written with Artur Makarov	
1970	The End of Ataman	No	Yes	Co-written with Andrei Konchalovsky & Eduard Tropinin	
1972	Solaris	Yes	Yes		
1973	The Ferocious One	No	Yes	Co-written with Andrei Konchalovsky & Eduard Tropinin	
1974	Sour Grape	No	Yes	Co-written with Ruben Ovsepyan	
1975	Mirror	Yes	Yes		
1979	Stalker	Yes	No		
1979	Look Out, Snake!	No	Yes		
1983	Nostalghia	Yes	Yes	Co-written with Tonino Guerra	
1983	Voyage in Time	Yes	Yes	Documentary, co-written and co-directed with Tonino Guerra	
1986	The Sacrifice	Yes	Yes		

=== Unfilmed scripts ===
Table featuring unfilmed scripts by Andrei Tarkovsky
Year written	Film	Ref.
1975	Hoffmanniana	
1978	Sardor	
1981	The Witch	

== Theatrical productions ==
Table featuring theatrical productions by Andrei Tarkovsky
Year	Play	Location	Ref.
1976	Hamlet	Lenkom Theatre, Moscow	
1983	Boris Godunov	Royal Opera House, London	

== Bibliography ==
Table featuring books by Andrei Tarkovsky
Year	Book title	Translator	Ref.
1985	Sculpting in Time	Kitty Hunter-Blair	
1991	Time Within Time: The Diaries 1970–1986	Kitty Hunter-Blair	
