= List of awards won by Andrei Tarkovsky =

Andrei Tarkovsky (1932–1986) was a Soviet (Note: Tarkovsky was born in the Russian SFSR, with his mother being from the Dubasov (Дубасовы) family of Russian nobility, and with mixed Polish, Romanian and Russian ancestry on his paternal side; his nationality remained Soviet throughout his life, even during his last years in exile.) film director and screenwriter of Russian origin. During his career he received numerous awards, both for individual films and in recognition of his work. This list is most likely incomplete as only awards and nominations have been included that are confirmed either by the award-giving organization or by reliable third-party sources (Note: For example, the Internet Movie Database (IMDb) lists several awards that are not included in this list. According to IMDb, Solaris won a FIPRESCI prize at the 1972 Cannes Film Festival, what is in conflict with the official information given by the Cannes Film Festival. Other awards on the IMDb list without official confirmation are a Best Foreign Film award by the French Syndicate of Cinema Critics for Andrei Rublev in 1971 and a Golden Spike for The Sacrifice at the Valladolid International Film Festival in 1986.).

== Film awards and nominations ==
=== Cannes Film Festival ===
Year	Award	Result	Category/Recipient
1969	FIPRESCI prize	Won	for Andrei Rublev
1972	Grand Prix Spécial du Jury	Won	for Solaris
1972	Palme d'Or	Nominated	for Solaris
1980	Prize of the Ecumenical Jury	Won	for Stalker
1983	Grand Prix du cinéma de creation	Won	for Nostalghia
1983	FIPRESCI prize	Won	for Nostalghia
1983	Prize of the Ecumenical Jury	Won	for Nostalghia
1983	Palme d'Or	Nominated	for Nostalghia
1986	FIPRESCI prize	Won	for The Sacrifice
1986	Prize of the Ecumenical Jury	Won	for The Sacrifice
1986	Grand Prix Spécial du Jury	Won	for The Sacrifice
1986	Palme d'Or	Nominated	for The Sacrifice

=== Venice Film Festival ===
Year	Award	Result	Category/Recipient
1962	Golden Lion	Won	for Ivan's Childhood

=== San Francisco International Film Festival ===
Year	Award	Result	Category/Recipient
1962	Golden Gate Award for Best Director	Won	for Ivan's Childhood

=== Jussi Award ===
Year	Award	Result	Category/Recipient
1973	Best Foreign Film	Won	for Andrei Rublev

=== Ente David di Donatello ===
Year	Award	Result	Category/Recipient
1980	Luchino Visconti Award	Won	for his work
1982	Golden Medal of the Minister of Tourism	Won	for his work

=== Fantasporto ===
Year	Award	Result	Category/Recipient
1983	Critics Award	Won	for Stalker
1983	Fantasy Film Award	Nominated	for Stalker

=== BAFTA Awards ===
Year	Award	Result	Category/Recipient
1987	BAFTA Award for Best Film Not in the English Language	Won	for The Sacrifice

== Other awards and honors ==
=== Government of the Soviet Union ===
Year	Award/Honor	Notes
1990	Lenin Prize	awarded posthumously

== See also ==
- Andrei Tarkovsky filmography
