= Mirror (1975 film) =

1975 Soviet experimental drama film by Andrei Tarkovsky

- Theatrical release poster
- Directed by: Andrei Tarkovsky
- Written by: Aleksandr Misharin; Andrei Tarkovsky
- Produced by: Erik Waisberg
- Starring: Margarita Terekhova; Ignat Daniltsev; Larisa Tarkovskaya; Alla Demidova; Anatoly Solonitsyn; Tamara Ogorodnikova
- Narrated by: Innokenty Smoktunovsky; Arseny Tarkovsky
- Cinematography: Georgy Rerberg
- Edited by: Lyudmila Feiginova
- Music by: Eduard Artemyev
- Production company: Mosfilm
- Release date: 7 March 1975
- Running time: 106 minutes
- Country: Soviet Union
- Languages: Russian, Spanish
- Budget: 622,000 Rbls

Mirror (Russian: Зеркало, romanized: Zerkalo) (Note: It is often known in the United States as The Mirror although Tarkovsky's official English translator, Kitty Hunter-Blair, always referred to the film as Mirror, not The Mirror, which was a later innovation unauthorized by the filmmaker.) is a 1975 Soviet avant-garde drama film directed by Andrei Tarkovsky and written by Tarkovsky and Aleksandr Misharin. The film features Margarita Terekhova, Ignat Daniltsev, Alla Demidova, Anatoly Solonitsyn, Tarkovsky's wife Larisa Tarkovskaya, and his mother Maria Vishnyakova. Innokenty Smoktunovsky contributed voiceover dialogue and Eduard Artemyev composed incidental music and sound effects.

Mirror portrays a dying poet pondering his memories. It is loosely autobiographical, unconventionally structured, and draws on a wide variety of source material, including newsreel footage of major moments in Soviet history and the poetry of the director's father, Arseny Tarkovsky. Its cinematography slips between color, black-and-white, and sepia, and is told through a nonlinear narrative. The film's loose flow of oneiric images has been compared with the stream of consciousness technique associated with modernist literature.

Mirror initially polarized critics, audiences, and the Soviet film establishment. Tarkovsky devised the original concept in 1964, but the Soviet government did not approve funding for the film until 1973 and limited the film's release amid accusations of “cinephilic elitism”. Many viewers found its narrative incomprehensible, although Tarkovsky noted that many non-film critics understood the film. Since its release, it has been reappraised as Tarkovsky's magnum opus and one of the greatest films of all time. It is especially popular with Russians, for many of whom it is the most beloved of Tarkovsky's works.

== Plot ==
=== Structure and content ===
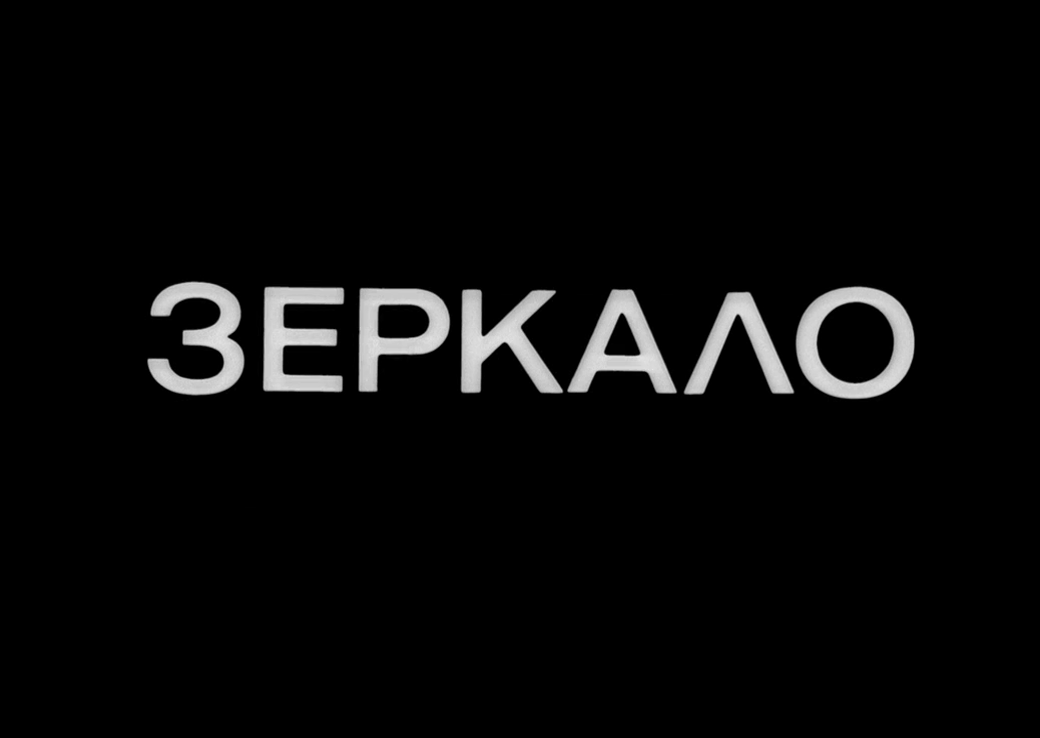
Opening logo of Mirror.

Mirror depicts the thoughts, emotions and memories of Aleksei, (Note: Aleksei is also called by the Russian diminutive (nickname) Alyosha.) a Soviet poet, as a child, adolescent, and 40-year-old. The film freely switches between three different timeframes: prewar (c. 1935), World War II (1940s), and postwar (1960s or '70s). The drama is entirely shown from Aleksei's perspective; the adult Aleksei's face is never shown, and his body only briefly glimpsed. Tarkovsky said that because a memory reveals "what [a person] thinks, how he thinks, and what he thinks about", a film collecting a man's memories "build[s] up a graphic and clearly-defined picture of him" without needing to show the man himself.

Tarkovsky structured the film as a series of memories Aleksei ponders, saying that "the episodes the narrator remembers at an extreme moment of crisis cause him pain up to the last minute, [and] fill him with sorrow and anxiety." To represent the real-life experience of a man going over old memories, the film's structure is discontinuous and nonchronological, lacks a conventional plot, and combines incidents, dreams, memories, newsreel footage, and Arseny Tarkovsky's poems in voiceover. Scenes are connected not by time or place, but by particular individuals and motifs that serendipitously come to mind, such as a book that Aleksei once read during an important moment, or a background character mentioned during a phone call.

The film encourages viewers to embrace its nonlinear, seemingly illogical narrative by including an opening scene in which a woman in a lab coat performs hypnosis on a young man, apparently curing his severe stutter.

=== Synopsis ===
Before the Great Patriotic War (1941–45), Aleksei's mother, Maria, (Note: Maria is also called by the Russian diminutives (nicknames) Masha and Marusya.) lives with her children in a plain countryside dacha. A passing doctor notes that Maria's husband has left her. Before leaving, the doctor mysteriously rambles about how modern Russians do not "trust the nature that is inside us". Maria stares out the window and silently cries while Tarkovsky's father recites his poems in voiceover. Her barn burns down. The family stare at the flames, powerless to stop them.

In a dream sequence (presented in black and white), young Aleksei sneaks out of bed to see his father helping his mother wash her hair. Water begins to pour down the walls, dissolving the ceiling. His mother looks in a mirror and sees a vision of herself as a proud, old woman.

In the present day (1960s/70s), after the war, the adult Aleksei is afflicted by a mysterious malady and haunted by memories of his father. He has a testy phone call with his mother, with whom he frequently quarrels. She hangs up on him.

In a second dream sequence, Maria rushes to her printing press to correct an embarrassing typo which turns out to have been imagined. As she searches for the typo, more poems by Tarkovsky's father are heard. Maria's coworker Liza criticizes her for her neediness, calls her a bad mother, and expresses shock that her husband stayed with her for so long. Maria begins to cry then rushes off to the office shower. Liza skips away down the hall, and after struggling with the water supply Maria begins to laugh.

Returning to the present, Aleksei quarrels with his ex-wife, Natalia, who has custody of their son, Ignat. Aleksei remarks on her resemblance to his mother, and claims it is Natalia's face he sees when remembering her. (In fact, Natalia and Maria are portrayed by the same actress.) Natalia complains that Aleksei is selfish, and is at fault for his strained relationship with Maria. He protests that it is his mother's fault for being too controlling.

Meanwhile their Spanish Loyalist friends in the next room discuss the struggles of their life in exile, and the film cuts to newsreel scenes of the Spanish Civil War, then a balloon ascent in the USSR.

Ignat helps his mother pick up coins spilled from her purse as she prepares to leave him at Aleksei's flat, when he remarks on a sudden sensation of deja vu. When his mother leaves he turns to suddenly find an unfamiliar woman having tea in the flat, empty moments before. She asks him to read a letter by Pushkin. Pushkin argues that the split between Orthodoxy and European Catholicism gave Russia its distinctive character and says being Russian is a gift from God. (Note: The Tarkovsky family was originally Roman Catholic, but converted to Orthodox Christianity when Russia conquered their homeland.) Ignat leaves to answer the door, but when he returns, the woman has vanished, though the condensation from her teacup momentarily remains.

Aleksei calls, and in conversation mentions a red-haired girl he had a crush on at Ignat's age. The film then turns to this time during World War II, when Aleksei is sent to a dour military school for boys. (At this point, we see that Ignat and the twelve-year-old Aleksei are played by the same actor.) One boy, an orphan, is admonished by the instructor, and in retaliation pulls a grenade from his sack. The other boys scoop it up and pull the pin; the instructor throws himself on it to save the children, only to find it is a dummy. Newsreel footage is intercut of the war, the atomic bomb, and the Sino-Soviet border conflict. Tarkovsky's father recites a poem about living in denial of death, darkness, and fear.

After the war ends, Aleksei's father returns. Maria is still bitter, but the children tearfully greet him. In a third dream sequence, Natalia and Aleksei argue about who should have custody of Ignat, whose grades are suffering. Aleksei claims Ignat has expressed a desire to live with him, though what we have seen previously was only his asking to stay with him temporarily during renovations. He poses the question to Ignat, who denies having said such a thing.

After Ignat goes outside, Natalia flips through some photos of Maria and herself, remarking on their resemblance which Aleksei now denies. She mentions a man she is considering for marriage, whom Aleksei mocks, and reveals she remains in closer contact with Aleksei's mother than he. As Ignat burns a branch out the window they discuss Moses and the burning bush, and Natalia complains that she has never received a vision from God.

In voiceover Aleksei recalls a recurring dream of being at his childhood home but unable to enter, though the film presents us with different reminiscences of this time (in color, not the dream sequence's black and white). He laments his current unhappiness in contrast with the joyful feeling of possibilities from youth.

The young Aleksei strikes a match, then another brief dream sequence begins: we see a vase filled with water and watch parts; young Aleksei calls out for his mother; he stands at the door to the dacha as it is pulled open, revealed to be empty; a rooster breaks through a window; a powerful gust blows through the brambles, leaving a table in disarray; Aleksei dashes around the house and tries the door to an outbuilding which will not open; after he turns away it swings ajar, revealing his mother behind it, peeling potatoes. She watches him go but says nothing.

We return to another reminiscence where Aleksei is older. They have been evacuated from Moscow due to the war and are back in the country, visiting a neighbor Maria knows of but has not met. Upon entering the house Maria spills her items on the floor. Aleksei is left alone while the two women discuss an unspecified ladies' matter. The young Aleksei studies himself in a mirror as milk drips from a table to the floor. The film cuts to an indistinct face reflected in small hand mirror in a smoldering fire outdoors, then a mirrored cabinet being closed, revealing in its reflection the red-haired girl warming her hands before a furnace and an older man who quickly walks away.

Back in the neighbor's house, the lantern flickers out and Aleksei sits in the dark. The neighbor tries on the earrings Maria has brought, apparently having agreed to buy them, and insists on showing off her child sleeping in another room. Maria appears nonplussed then suddenly grows ill.

The neighbor complains that she cannot slaughter a rooster due to her pregnancy and pressures Maria to do it for her, but turns away at the fateful moment. Maria steels herself but we see only a puff of feathers and hear the bird dash away. She glances at the neighbor, then smiles to herself and gazes into the camera while water runs down the wall behind. She sees a vision of her husband (another black and white sequence), comforting her as she levitates above her bed. She laments only seeing him when she is upset and admits that she still loves him. Back in the neighbor's home she rushes away with Aleksei. Another poem begins, describing the soul's lament at being imprisoned in the body, while we return to the previous dream sequence of young Aleksei standing at the door to the empty dacha. This time he steps inside, carrying a jug of milk through the sheets that hang drying inside. The camera tracks in on a mirror at the far end of the room and Aleksei reappears, reflected in it, and raises the milk to his face. In the distance a dog barks and a train whistle blows.

In the final sequence of the film, three story lines intersect. The camera again tracks through the sheets in the dacha but it is freshly furnished and a small puppy clambers about. The view shifts out the window revealing two children who look like Aleksei and his sister, but they are with the elderly Maria. Aleksei lies in his deathbed, where a doctor declares his only ailment is a guilty conscience. He bitterly casts his few loved ones away and releases a small bird. In the past, Aleksei's father asks a pregnant Maria if she hopes for a girl or a boy, but instead of answering she suddenly looks into the distance, as if she can see her elderly self there, walking with her grandchildren past the rotting ruins of a dacha. Tears well in young Maria's eyes while elderly Maria and the children continue on through the meadow. (Note: In the final shot they pass by a transmission tower in the shape of a cross. Tarkovsky's favorite film, Diary of a Country Priest, also ends with a shot of a Christian cross.)

== Cast ==
Several of the characters are played by the same actors.

- Margarita Terekhova as the young Maria (Aleksei's mother) and Natalia (Aleksei's ex-wife)
  - Maria Vishnyakova (Tarkovsky's mother) as the elderly Maria
- Ignat Daniltsev as the adolescent Aleksei and Ignat (Aleksei's son)
  - Filipp Yankovsky as the child Aleksei
  - Innokenty Smoktunovsky as the adult Aleksei (voice only)
- Oleg Yankovsky as Aleksei's father
- Alla Demidova as Yelizaveta Pavlovna (Liza), Maria's coworker
- Nikolai Grinko as the director of Maria's printing house
- Anatoly Solonitsyn as a traveling doctor
- Yuriy Nazarov as Aleksei's military instructor
- Tamara Ogorodnikova as the mysterious woman drinking tea and the nanny
- Larisa Tarkovskaya (Tarkovsky's wife) as Nadezhda, Maria's countryside neighbor
- Olga Kizilova as the redhead
- Arseny Tarkovsky (Tarkovsky's father) as narrator/poet (voice only)

== Themes and interpretation ==
While highly acclaimed, Mirror continues to be viewed as enigmatic. Natasha Synessios wrote that it is closer in structure to a musical piece than a narrative film, noting that Tarkovsky "always maintained that he used the laws of music as the film's organisational principle...emphasis placed not on the logic, but the form, of the flow of events." Critic Antti Alanen called the film a "space odyssey into the interior of the psyche" and Tarkovsky's own personalized version of Marcel Proust's In Search of Lost Time. Howard Hampton argued that the work's central subject is "the inescapable persistence of the past".

Mirror draws heavily on Tarkovsky's childhood. The film frequently parallels events in Tarkovsky's life, such as the evacuation from Moscow to the countryside during the war; a father who left the family and only returned after the war; and his mother's experiences as a proofreader at a state-owned printing press. Both of Tarkovsky's parents participate in the film: the father reads his poems and the mother portrays an elderly version of Aleksei's mother. According to Tarkovsky's sister Marina, the film also reflects Tarkovsky's guilt about divorcing his first wife, Irma Raush. She said that Tarkovsky named the film Mirror because he "understood that he had followed in the footsteps of our father, who had also divorced our mother".

Tarkovsky said making the film was personally therapeutic, as it allowed him to move on from his memories. But while Mirror is often characterized as an autobiographical film, it is not hagiographic. In Sculpting in Time, Tarkovsky wrote, "The hero of Mirror was a weak, selfish man incapable of loving even those dearest to him for their sake alone, looking for nothing in return—he is only justified by the torment of soul which assails him towards the end of his days as he realizes that he has no means of repaying the debt he owes to life."

== Production ==
=== Writing ===
The concept of Mirror dates to 1964, when Tarkovsky wrote down his idea for a film about the dreams and memories of a man, without the man appearing on screen. The first episodes of Mirror were written while Tarkovsky was working on Andrei Rublev. These episodes were published in 1970 as a short story titled A White Day. The title was taken from a 1942 poem by his father, Arseny Tarkovsky. Tarkovsky separately considered writing a novella about a boy who is evacuated to the countryside during World War II and is forced to train at a military school, but shelved the idea after deciding there was not enough material for a standalone work.

In 1968, after finishing Andrei Rublev, Tarkovsky went to the cinematographer's resort in Repino intending to write the script for The Mirror with Aleksandr Misharin. This script was titled Confession and was proposed to the film committee at Goskino. It contained popular themes such as a heroic mother, the war, and patriotism, but the proposal was rejected. The main reason was most likely the complex and unconventional script. Moreover, Tarkovsky and Misharin clearly said that they did not know what the film's final form would be; this was to be determined in the process of filming. After the script was rejected, Tarkovsky made the film Solaris. His diary entries showed that he was still eager to make the rejected film.

Several versions of the script for Mirror exist, as Tarkovsky constantly rewrote parts of it, with the latest variant written in 1974 while he was in Italy. One scene that was in the script but removed during shooting was an interview with his mother. Tarkovsky wanted to use a hidden camera to interview her on the pretext that it was research for the film. His idea was for the film to intercut a filmed narrative of his childhood with his present-day mother's analysis of how she raised her son, "thus juxtaposing two comparative perceptions of the past". This scene was one of the main reasons Vadim Yusov, the cameraman for all of Tarkovsky's previous films, refused to work with him on this film. (Yusov added that he considered the script too personal and self-absorbed.) Tarkovsky ultimately gave up on the idea because he could not make it work as a feature film.

At various times, the script and the film were titled Confession, Redemption, Martyrology, Why are you standing so far away?, The Raging Stream and A White, White Day (sometimes also translated as A Bright, Bright Day). While filming, Tarkovsky decided to title the film Mirror. The film features several mirrors, with some scenes shot in reflection.

=== Studio approval ===
The new head of Goskino, Filipp Ermash, approved the script in the summer of 1973. Tarkovsky was given a budget of 622,000 Rbls and 7,500 metres (24,606 feet) of Kodak film, corresponding to 110 minutes, or roughly three takes, assuming a film length of 3,000 metres (10,000 feet). But in July 1974, after Tarkovsky finished the film, Ermash rejected it as incomprehensible. Infuriated by the rejection, Tarkovsky toyed with the idea of making a film outside the Soviet Union. Goskino ultimately approved Mirror without any changes in fall 1974.

=== Casting ===
Initially, Tarkovsky considered Alla Demidova and Swedish actress Bibi Andersson for the role of the mother. In the end, he chose Margarita Terekhova.

=== Filming ===
Principal photography began in July 1973 and ended in March 1974. Outdoor scenes were shot in Tutshkovo, near Moscow, and indoor scenes were shot at the Mosfilm studio. The country house in the film was based on photographs of the house where Tarkovsky grew up. The film's naturalist style required Terekhova to forego makeup.

Tarkovsky insisted on shooting the film without a clear idea of its structure, saying it needed to "take shape as if it were by itself." Much of the script was rewritten during the shoot. Tarkovsky was down to 400 metres of film when he came up with the idea of recasting Terekhova as Aleksei's wife. She had initially played only the mother. Tarkovsky also took advantage of his imprecision to extract more realistic acting performances. During the early scenes where Maria waits for her husband, he did not tell Terekhova that Maria's husband eventually returns, to better ensure that her performance would be authentically unsure.

A poster of Tarkovsky's 1966 film Andrei Rublev is seen on a wall. Mirror is the third film in a series in which Tarkovsky references Andrei Rublev, along with his eponymous 1966 film and Solaris (1972), in which a bust of the painter is seen in the main character's room.

=== Editing ===
Tarkovsky said that a "prodigious amount of work went into editing Mirror". There are about 200 shots in Mirror, very few for a film of its length. Tarkovsky rejected editing as a means of creating, or determining, rhythm, believing that editing "means allowing the separate scenes and shots to come together spontaneously". It was only after "one last, desperate rearrangement" that the "film was born". He felt it was a "miracle" that Mirror held together.

Tarkovsky was extremely pleased with the final cut, saying, "when I finished making Mirror[,] [c]hildhood memories which for years had given me no peace suddenly vanished, as if they had melted away, and at last I stopped dreaming about the house where I had lived so many years before."

== Release ==
Russian DVD cover of Mirror.

Tarkovsky wanted to premiere the film in competition at the 1975 Cannes Film Festival, but the Soviet government (which could submit only one film to the festival per year) chose Sergei Bondarchuk's They Fought for Their Country instead. The festival's managing director, Maurice Bessy, was sympathetic to Tarkovsky, and had attempted several times to acquire Mirror for Cannes. Upon hearing that Mirror was not allowed to be shown, he threatened to ban They Fought for Their Country from the festival. The Soviets pushed back, insisting that "Soviet cinematographic circles refused [...] to accept the idea that Tarkovsky was the only filmmaker of international stature."

Mirror never had an official premiere, only a limited, second-category release with just 73 copies. According to The New York Times, the film premiered in two Moscow theaters in April 1975.

=== Home video ===
The film was released on VHS in the United States by the International Film Forum, albeit in an edited form that it down to 90 minutes. It was also released on VHS in France by Ciné Vidéo Film and in the United Kingdom by Artificial Eye. In Japan, it was released on LaserDisc by Toho.

The film's initial DVD release was in the United States by Kino Video on 19 April 2000. The disc itself is rather basic, featuring only the film and having subtitled encoded into the video itself. Much like Tarkovsky's other films, it was released on DVD by the Russian home video company RusCiCo in 2002 for the international market, containing a newly mixed Dolby Digital 5.1 surround sound track (with later revisions also adding the original mono) and thirteen different subtitle languages; in addition to the DVD being region-free, its contents would be licensed to many other companies, including Artificial Eye in the United Kingdom, MK2 in France, Njuta Films in Sweden, Zona-Aerofilms in the Czech Republic, and Spectrum Entertainment in South Korea. Lizard handled the domestic DVD in Russia, with both single-layer and dual-layer versions existing.

A new restoration was released by Artificial Eye on 27 June 2011 as part of The Andrei Tarkovsky Collection DVD set. This restoration is also featured on the Japanese Blu-ray by IVC and Artificial Eye's own Blu-ray in 2016. In the United States and Canada, it was released on Blu-ray in 2021 by The Criterion Collection, featuring a new restoration from a 2K scan of the original camera negative done by Mosfilm. Criterion also released their Blu-ray in the United Kingdom in 2026.

Mosfilm posted the full movie on YouTube three separate times: first in 2022 with English subtitles, then in 2023 with Spanish subtitles, and lastly in 2024 subtitled in Arabic.

== Reception ==
On the review aggregator website Rotten Tomatoes, 100% of 29 critics' reviews are positive, with an average rating of 9.1/10. Metacritic assigned the film a weighted average score of 82 out of 100, based on 14 critics, indicating "universal acclaim".

When Mosfilm critics were asked in November 1974 to evaluate Mirror, responses were divided. The New York Times wrote that "in the first round of published reviews, in which some of Mr. Tarkovsky's fellow film makers evaluated his new work, there is much praise, tempered with criticism of some parts of the film." Some viewed it as a major work that would be better understood by future generations; others dismissed it as an unfocused failure and believed that even more cultured viewers would find its story opaque. When Mirror was released, several Soviet filmmakers publicly condemned it as "inadmissibly 'elitist.'" This resulted in very limited distribution.

Many audience members walked out of theatrical screenings, but those who liked the film were ardent in their praise. In his book Sculpting in Time, Tarkovsky reproduced fan mail from a variety of sources, from working-class film-goers to physicists at the Russian Academy of Sciences. A woman wrote to Tarkovsky that Mirror resembled her childhood, and told him, "Lord, how true ... we really don't know our mother's faces." Tarkovsky wrote that he had "spent so many years being told that nobody wanted or understood my films, that a response like that warmed my very soul."

== Legacy ==
=== Polls and associated reviews ===
Mirror is frequently listed among the greatest films of all time. In a 2012 Sight & Sound directors' poll, Mirror ranked as the ninth greatest film of all time. In a parallel poll of film critics, the film ranks 19th. In the same poll in 2022, Mirror was ranked eighth by directors and 31st by critics. In the 2002 critics' poll it ranked 35th. Filmmaker Ashim Ahluwalia included the film in his personal top ten (for The Sight & Sound Top 50 Greatest Films of All Time poll), writing: "Mirror offers epic hypnotherapy and some of the most beautiful celluloid ever shot." For the same poll, Will Self wrote that it remains "the most beautiful film ever made". Director Michael Haneke voted for Mirror in the 2002 Sight & Sound directors' poll (where the film ranked 16th) and later said he had seen it at least 25 times. In the most recent 2022 edition of Sight & Sound's Greatest films of all time list the film ranked 31st in the critics' poll and 8th in the directors' poll.

In 2018, Mirror ranked 20th on the BBC's list of the 100 greatest foreign-language films, as voted on by 209 film critics from 43 countries.

=== Other appraisals ===
Peter Bradshaw of The Guardian called Mirror "a startling piece of film-making" and many of its images "transcendentally brilliant". In the British Film Institute, the film is billed as "a work of cumulative, rhythmic effect" and its unconventional narrative is credited with having "pioneered a poetic and richly allusive form."

Director Christopher Nolan cited Mirror as an influence on his 2023 film Oppenheimer, particularly in regard to cinematography.

On March 21, 2025, an adaptation directed by Bülent Özdil, premiered at the German State Theatre in Timisoara.
