= Andrei Tarkovsky =

Soviet filmmaker (1932–1986)

- Андрей Тарковский
- Andrei Tarkovsky in 1980
- Born: Andrei Arsenyevich Tarkovsky; 4 April 1932; Zavrazhye, Russian SFSR, Soviet Union
- Died: 29 December 1986 (aged 54); Paris, France
- Resting place: Sainte-Geneviève-des-Bois Russian Cemetery, Paris
- Education: All-Union State Institute of Cinematography
- Occupations: Film director; screenwriter; film theorist
- Years active: 1958–1986
- Works: Full list
- Spouses: Irma Raush (m. 1957; div. 1970) Larisa Kizilova (m. 1970)
- Children: 3
- Father: Arseny Tarkovsky
- Relatives: Marina Tarkovskaya (sister)
- Awards: List

Andrei Arsenyevich Tarkovsky (Russian: Андрей Арсеньевич Тарковский, pronounced [ɐnˈdrʲej ɐrˈsʲenʲjɪvʲɪtɕ tɐrˈkofskʲɪj]; 4 April 1932 – 29 December 1986) was a Soviet (Note: Tarkovsky was born in the Russian Soviet Federative Socialist Republic, with his mother being from the Dubasov family of Russian nobility, and with mixed Polish, Romanian, and Russian ancestry on his paternal side; his nationality remained Soviet throughout his life, even during his last years in exile.) film director and screenwriter of Russian origin. He is widely considered one of the greatest directors in cinema history. His films explore spiritual and metaphysical themes and are known for their slow pacing and long takes, dreamlike visual imagery, and preoccupation with nature and memory.

Tarkovsky studied film at the All-Union State Institute of Cinematography under filmmaker Mikhail Romm and subsequently directed his first five features in the Soviet Union: Ivan's Childhood (1962), Andrei Rublev (1966), Solaris (1972), Mirror (1975), and Stalker (1979). After years of creative conflict with state film authorities, he left the country in 1979 and made his final two films—Nostalghia (1983) and The Sacrifice (1986)—abroad. In 1986, he published Sculpting in Time, a book about cinema and art. He died later that year of cancer, a condition possibly caused by the toxic locations used in the filming of Stalker.

Tarkovsky was the recipient of numerous accolades throughout his career, including the FIPRESCI prize, the Prize of the Ecumenical Jury and the Grand Prix Spécial du Jury at the Cannes Film Festival in addition to the Golden Lion at the Venice Film Festival for his debut film, Ivan's Childhood, as well as the BAFTA Film Award for The Sacrifice. In 1990 he was posthumously awarded the Soviet Union's prestigious Lenin Prize. Three of his films—Andrei Rublev, Mirror, and Stalker—featured in Sight & Sound's 2012 poll of the 100 greatest films of all time.

== Life and career ==
=== Childhood and early life ===
Andrei Tarkovsky was born on 4 April 1932 in the village of Zavrazhye, near the town of Yuryevets, located about 500 kilometres (310 mi) east from Moscow. His father was the poet and translator Arseny Aleksandrovich Tarkovsky, and his mother was Maria Ivanovna (née Vishnyakova). Both his parents were graduates of the Moscow Literature Institute. Shortly before his birth, Andrei's parents moved to the village as Maria's father, a doctor, lived there. His sister, Marina, was born in 1934.

Andrei's paternal grandfather, Aleksandr Karlovich Tarkovsky (Polish: Aleksander Karol Tarkowski), was a Polish nobleman who worked as a bank clerk. His wife, Maria Danilovna Rachkovskaya, was a Romanian-language teacher who had arrived from Iași. Andrei's maternal grandmother, Vera Nikolayevna Vishnyakova (née Dubasova), belonged to the old Dubasov family of the Russian nobility, which traced its history back to the 17th century. Among her relatives was Admiral Fyodor Dubasov, a fact she had to conceal during the Soviet period. She was married to Ivan Ivanovich Vishnyakov, a native of Kaluga Governorate, who studied law at Moscow University and served as a judge in Kozelsk.

According to the family legend, Tarkovsky's ancestors on his father's side were princes from the Shamkhalate of Tarki, Dagestan, although his sister, Marina, who conducted detailed research on their genealogy, called it "a myth, even a prank of sorts," stressing that no document confirms this narrative.

Tarkovsky's father left the family for another woman in 1936–1937. Although his father remarried, his mother did not, instead choosing to devote herself to her children and her work. Tarkovsky later recounted: "I lived with mother, grandmother, and sister. Family without a man. This had a considerable impact on my character [...] That was a difficult time. I have always missed my father. When father left us, I was three years old. Life was incredibly difficult in any possible way."

Following the German invasion of the Soviet Union in 1941, Tarkovsky's family evacuated to Yuryevets, which became his childhood home. He lived with his maternal grandmother until 1943. Tarkovsky had spent most of his life in Moscow and had spent most of his time indoors, but in Yuryevets, he was left alone and exposed to street life. He saved his mother from drowning in a river, which became one of his most traumatic experiences in Yuryevets. Tarkovsky hoped that his father, who was fighting in the war, would return home. Arseny lost his leg and received a medal, but he never returned home or met his son, which caused Andrei great pain.

Tarkovsky remained with his mother, moving with her and his sister Marina to Moscow, where his mother worked as a proof-reader at a printing press. Tarkovsky continued his studies at his old school, Moscow School No. 554, where the poet Andrei Voznesensky was one of his classmates. He studied piano at a music school and attended classes at an art school. The family lived on Shchipok Street in the Zamoskvorechye District in Moscow. From November 1947 to spring 1948 he was in the hospital with tuberculosis. Many themes of his childhood—the evacuation, his mother and her two children, the withdrawn father, the time in the hospital—feature prominently in his film Mirror.

In his school years, Tarkovsky was a troublemaker and a poor student. He still managed to graduate, and from 1951 to 1952 studied Arabic at the Oriental Institute in Moscow, a branch of the Academy of Sciences of the Soviet Union. He did not finish his studies and dropped out to work as a prospector for the Academy of Science Institute for Non-Ferrous Metals and Gold. He participated in a year-long research expedition to the river Kureyka near Turukhansk in Krasnoyarsk Krai. During this time in the taiga, Tarkovsky decided to study film.

=== Film school student ===
Upon returning from the research expedition in 1954, Tarkovsky applied at the State Institute of Cinematography (VGIK) and was admitted to the film-directing program. He was in the same class as Irma Raush (Irina) whom he married in April 1957.

The early Khrushchev era offered good opportunities for young film directors. Before 1953, annual film production was low and most films were directed by veteran directors. After 1953, more films were produced, many of them by young directors. The Khrushchev Thaw relaxed Soviet social restrictions a bit and permitted a limited influx of European and North American literature, films and music. This allowed Tarkovsky to see films of the Italian neorealists, French New Wave, and of directors such as Kurosawa, Buñuel, Bergman, Bresson, Wajda (whose film Ashes and Diamonds influenced Tarkovsky) and Mizoguchi.

Tarkovsky's teacher and mentor was Mikhail Romm, who taught many film students who would later become influential film directors. In 1956, Tarkovsky directed his first student short film, The Killers, from a short story of Ernest Hemingway. The longer television film There Will Be No Leave Today followed in 1959. Both films were a collaboration between the VGIK students. Classmate Aleksandr Gordon, who married Tarkovsky's sister, in particular directed, wrote, edited, and acted in the two films with Tarkovsky.

During his third year at the VGIK, Tarkovsky met Andrei Konchalovsky. They found much in common as they liked the same film directors and shared ideas on cinema and films. In 1959, they wrote the script Antarctica – Distant Country, which was later published in the Moskovskij Komsomolets. Tarkovsky submitted the script to Lenfilm, but it was rejected. They were more successful with the script The Steamroller and the Violin, which they sold to Mosfilm. This became Tarkovsky's graduation project, earning him his diploma in 1960 and winning First Prize at the New York Student Film Festival in 1961.

=== Film career in the Soviet Union ===
Tarkovsky's first feature film was Ivan's Childhood in 1962. He had inherited the film from director Eduard Abalov, who had to abort the project. The film earned Tarkovsky international acclaim and won the Golden Lion award at the Venice Film Festival in the year 1962. In the same year, on 30 September, his first son Arseny (called Senka in Tarkovsky's diaries) Tarkovsky was born.

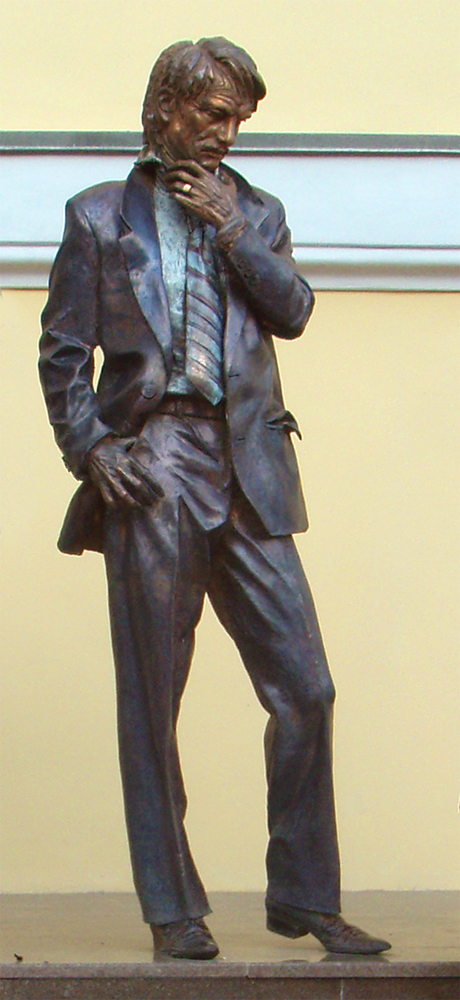
Monument to Andrei Tarkovsky at entrance of Gerasimov Institute of Cinematography

In 1965, he directed the film Andrei Rublev about the life of Andrei Rublev, the fifteenth-century Russian icon painter. Andrei Rublev was not, except for a single screening in Moscow in 1966, immediately released after completion due to problems with Soviet authorities. Tarkovsky had to cut the film several times, resulting in several different versions of varying lengths. The film was widely released in the Soviet Union in a cut version in 1971. Nevertheless, the film had a budget of more than 1 million rubles – a significant sum for that period. A version of the film was presented at the Cannes Film Festival in 1969 and won the FIPRESCI prize.

He divorced his wife, Irina, in June 1970. In the same year, he married Larisa Kizilova (née Egorkina), who had been a production assistant for the film Andrei Rublev (they had been living together since 1965). Their son, Andrei Andreyevich Tarkovsky, (nicknamed Andriosha, meaning "little Andre" or "Andre Junior") was born in the same year on 7 August.

In 1972, he completed Solaris, an adaptation of the science fiction novel Solaris by Stanisław Lem. He had worked on this together with screenwriter Friedrich Gorenstein as early as 1968. The film was presented at the Cannes Film Festival, won the Grand Prix Spécial du Jury, and was nominated for the Palme d'Or.

From 1973 to 1974, he shot the film Mirror, a highly autobiographical and unconventionally structured film drawing on his childhood and incorporating some of his father's poems. In this film Tarkovsky portrayed the plight of childhood affected by war. Tarkovsky had worked on the screenplay for this film since 1967, under the consecutive titles Confession, White day and A white, white day. From the beginning the film was not well received by Soviet authorities due to its content and its perceived elitist nature. Soviet authorities placed the film in the "third category", a severely limited distribution, and only allowed it to be shown in third-class cinemas and workers' clubs. Few prints were made and the film-makers received no returns. Third category films also placed the film-makers in danger of being accused of wasting public funds, which could have serious effects on their future productivity. These difficulties are presumed to have made Tarkovsky play with the idea of going abroad and producing a film outside the Soviet film industry.

During 1975, Tarkovsky also worked on the screenplay Hoffmanniana, about the German writer and poet E. T. A. Hoffmann. In December 1976, he directed Hamlet, his only stage play, at the Lenkom Theatre in Moscow. The main role was played by Anatoly Solonitsyn, who also acted in several of Tarkovsky's films. At the end of 1978, he also wrote the screenplay Sardor together with the writer Aleksandr Misharin.

The last film Tarkovsky completed in the Soviet Union was Stalker, inspired by the novel Roadside Picnic by the brothers Arkady and Boris Strugatsky. Tarkovsky had met the brothers first in 1971 and was in contact with them until his death in 1986. Initially he wanted to shoot a film based on their novel Dead Mountaineer's Hotel and he developed a raw script. Influenced by a discussion with Arkady Strugatsky he changed his plan and began to work on the script based on Roadside Picnic. Work on this film began in 1976. The production was mired in troubles; improper development of the negatives had ruined all the exterior shots. Tarkovsky's relationship with cinematographer Georgy Rerberg deteriorated to the point where he hired Alexander Knyazhinsky as a new first cinematographer. Furthermore, Tarkovsky had a heart attack in April 1978, resulting in further delay. The film was completed in 1979 and won the Prize of the Ecumenical Jury at the Cannes Film Festival. In a question and answer session at the Edinburgh Filmhouse on 11 February 1981, Tarkovsky trenchantly rejected suggestions that the film was either impenetrably mysterious or a political allegory.

=== Film career outside the Soviet Union ===
During the summer of 1979, Tarkovsky traveled to Italy, where he shot the documentary Voyage in Time together with his long-time friend Tonino Guerra. Tarkovsky returned to Italy in 1980 for an extended trip, during which he and Guerra completed the script for the film Nostalghia. During this period, he took Polaroid photographs depicting his personal life.

Tarkovsky returned to Italy in 1982 to start shooting Nostalghia, but Mosfilm then withdrew from the project, so he sought and received financial backing from the Italian RAI. Tarkovsky completed the film in 1983, and it was presented at the Cannes Film Festival where it won the FIPRESCI prize and the Prize of the Ecumenical Jury. Tarkovsky also shared a special prize called Grand Prix du cinéma de création with Robert Bresson. Soviet authorities lobbied to prevent the film from winning the Palme d'Or, a fact that hardened Tarkovsky's resolve never to work in the Soviet Union again. After Cannes he went to London to stage and choreograph the opera Boris Godunov at the Royal Opera House under the musical direction of Claudio Abbado.

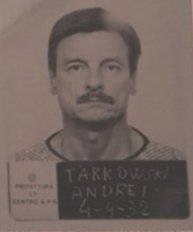
Mug shot of Andrei Tarkovsky at the Latina Refugee Camp of Latina (Italy) in 1985

At a press conference in Milan on 10 July 1984, he announced that he would never return to the Soviet Union and would remain in Western Europe. He stated, "I am not a Soviet dissident, I have no conflict with the Soviet Government," but if he returned home, he added, "I would be unemployed." At that time, his son Andriosha was still in the Soviet Union and not allowed to leave the country. On 28 August 1985, Tarkovsky was processed as a Soviet Defector at a refugee camp in Latina, Italy, registered with the serial number 13225/379, and officially welcomed to the West.

Tarkovsky spent most of 1984 preparing the film The Sacrifice. It was finally shot in 1985 in Sweden, with many of the crew being alumni from Ingmar Bergman's films, including cinematographer Sven Nykvist. Tarkovsky's vision of his film was greatly influenced by Bergman's style.

While The Sacrifice is about an apocalypse and impending death, faith, and possible redemption, in the making-of documentary Directed by Andrei Tarkovsky, in a particularly poignant scene, writer/director Michal Leszczylowski follows Tarkovsky on a walk as he expresses his sentiments on death—he claims himself to be immortal and has no fear of dying. Ironically, at the end of the year Tarkovsky was diagnosed with terminal lung cancer. In January 1986, he began treatment in Paris and was joined there by his son, Andre Jr, who was finally allowed to leave the Soviet Union. What would be Tarkovsky's final film was dedicated to him.

The Sacrifice was presented at the Cannes Film Festival and received the Grand Prix Spécial du Jury, the FIPRESCI prize and the Prize of the Ecumenical Jury. As Tarkovsky was unable to attend due to his illness, the prizes were collected by his son.

=== Death ===
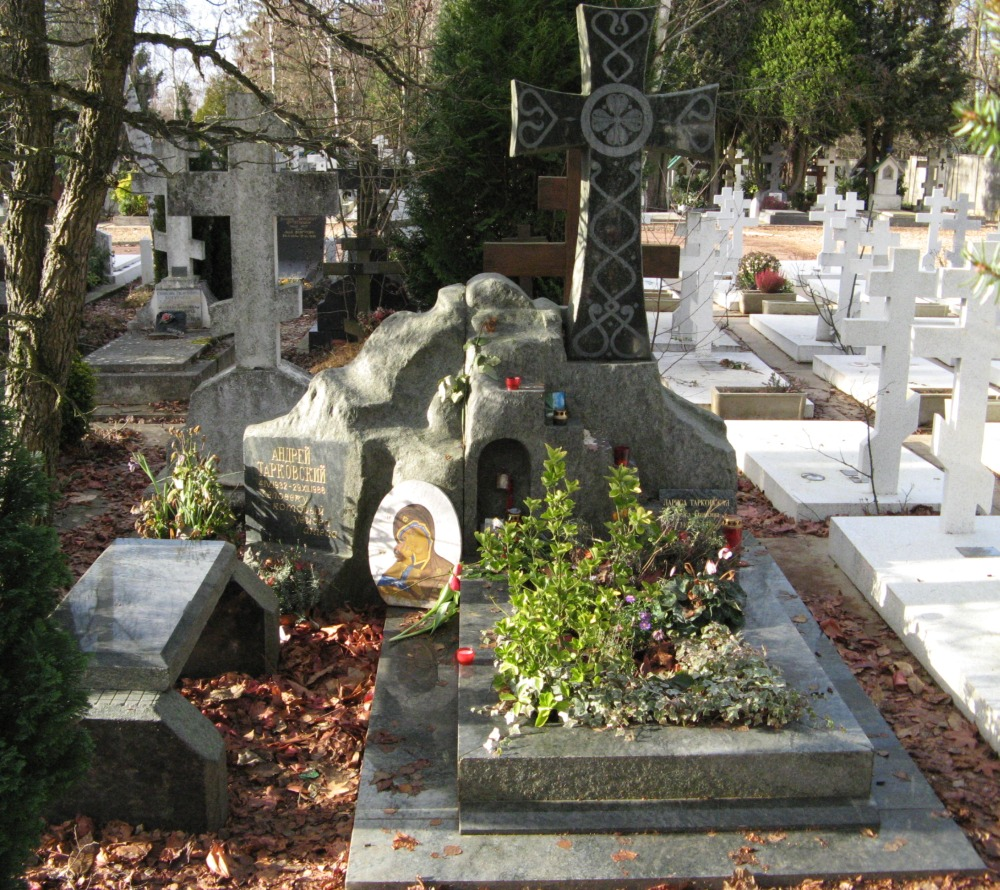
Andrei and Larisa Tarkovsky's grave, Sainte-Geneviève-des-Bois Russian Cemetery in France

In Tarkovsky's last diary entry (15 December 1986), he wrote: "But now I have no strength left—that is the problem". The diaries are sometimes also known as Martyrology and were published posthumously in 1989 and in English in 1991.

Tarkovsky died in Clinique Hartmann in Neuilly-sur-Seine near Paris on 29 December 1986. His funeral ceremony was held at the Alexander Nevsky Cathedral. He was buried on 3 January 1987 in the Russian Cemetery in Sainte-Geneviève-des-Bois in France. The inscription on his gravestone, which was erected in 1994, was conceived by Tarkovsky's wife, Larisa, reads: To the man who saw the Angel. Larisa died in 1998 and is buried beside her husband.

Tarkovsky, his wife Larisa, and actor Anatoly Solonitsyn all died from the same type of cancer. Vladimir Sharun, a sound designer for Stalker, was convinced that all three died due to exposure to chemicals released from a chemical plant upstream from where the film was shot.

== Influences and thoughts on film ==
Tarkovsky became a film director during the mid and late 1950s, a period referred to as the Khrushchev Thaw, during which Soviet society opened to foreign films, literature and music, among other things. This allowed Tarkovsky to see films of European, American and Japanese directors, an experience that influenced his own film making. His teacher and mentor at the film school, Mikhail Romm, allowed his students considerable freedom and emphasized the independence of the film director.

Tarkovsky was, according to fellow student Shavkat Abdusalmov, fascinated by Japanese films. He was amazed by how every character on the screen is exceptional and how everyday events such as a Samurai cutting bread with his sword are elevated to something special and put into the limelight. Tarkovsky has also expressed interest in the art of Haiku and its ability to create "images in such a way that they mean nothing beyond themselves".

Tarkovsky perceived that the art of cinema has only been truly mastered by very few filmmakers, stating in a 1970 interview with Naum Abramov that "they can be counted on the fingers of one hand". In 1972, Tarkovsky told film historian Leonid Kozlov his ten favorite films. The list is as follows: Diary of a Country Priest and Mouchette by Robert Bresson; Winter Light, Wild Strawberries, and Persona by Ingmar Bergman; Nazarín by Luis Buñuel; City Lights by Charlie Chaplin; Ugetsu by Kenji Mizoguchi; Seven Samurai by Akira Kurosawa, and Woman in the Dunes by Hiroshi Teshigahara. He also liked Pier Paolo Pasolini's film The Gospel According to St. Matthew. Among his favorite directors were Buñuel, Mizoguchi, Bergman, Bresson, Kurosawa, Michelangelo Antonioni, Jean Vigo, and Carl Theodor Dreyer.

With the exception of City Lights, the list does not contain any films of the early silent era. The reason is that Tarkovsky saw film as an art as only a relatively recent phenomenon, with the early film-making forming only a prelude. The list has also no films or directors from Tarkovsky's native Soviet Union, although he rated Soviet directors such as Boris Barnet, Sergei Parajanov, and Alexander Dovzhenko highly. He said of Dovzhenko's Earth: "I have lived a lot among very simple farmers and met extraordinary people. They spread calmness, had such tact, they conveyed a feeling of dignity and displayed wisdom that I have seldom come across on such a scale. Dovzhenko had obviously understood wherein the sense of life resides. [...] This trespassing of the border between nature and mankind is an ideal place for the existence of man. Dovzhenko understood this." Tarkovsky considered Earth to be his cinematic "university" and would watch the film whenever beginning a new work.

He was also not a fan of blockbusters or science fiction, largely dismissing the latter for its "comic book" trappings and vulgar commercialism. However, according to his son, Andrei A. Tarkovsky, Tarkovsky enjoyed George Lucas's Star Wars.

== Themes ==
In his work, Tarkovsky explored philosophical and religious themes, such as the meaning and experience of faith, inner freedom, the soul's relation to the divine or non-material realm, and the act of artistic creation. These themes found direct expression in his unique cinematic formal style and subject matter.

Although he considered himself to be a religious person, he refused to be narrowly defined by any one label and had little regard for the institutional church. (Note: The full quote from Sculpting in Time (p. 237) runs as follows: "Not even the Church can quench man's thirst for the Absolute, for unfortunately it only exists as a kind of appendage, copying or even caricaturing the social institutions by which our everyday life is organised. Certainly in today's world which leans so heavily towards the material and the technological, the Church so far shows no sign of being able to redress the balance with a call to a spiritual awakening.") Speaking about The Sacrifice, in his last interview he stated: "I don't think it's really important whether I adhere to any particular conviction or faith—heathen, Catholic, Protestant or Christian in general. What matters is the film."

His films evince an idiosyncratic and eclectic spirituality, drawing elements from Christian mysticism, existentialism, supernaturalism, paganism, and anthroposophy. He was deeply influenced by the existentialist writings of Dostoevsky, and planned to make a film about the writer that was never completed.

Tarkovsky was vehemently critical of what he perceived to be the overly rationalistic, egoistic, decadent, and materialistic outlook of Western culture, which in his view was concerned more with monetary profit and individual self-expression than with artistic ideals like beauty, truth, and selflessness. This critique of late modernity is embedded in his films. As his diaries indicate, these perceptions were heightened during his period of exile in the West.

Against this state of societal decline and spiritual impoverishment, Tarkovsky expounded an ethics of art based on a "poetic" understanding of the passions and complexities of life, one in which freedom and authentic action are possible. The artist, for Tarkovsky, has a quasi-religious, ascetic duty to disavow the self in service of a higher spiritual purpose, a process mirrored by characters in films such as Andrei Rublev, Stalker, and The Sacrifice. Tarkovsky saw fragments of this artistic ideal in some Western art (notably J.S. Bach), in Eastern Orthodox Christian iconography, and, increasingly, in East Asian spiritual traditions like Taoism and Zen Buddhism—elements of which also recur in the films. Many of his films can be viewed as expressing the dualistic conflict between these opposing worldviews of West and East.

In interviews and writings, Tarkovsky frequently commented that art itself was the epitome of a religious sensibility which actively surrendered to something greater than the self:

The one thing that mankind has ever created in a spirit of self-surrender is the artistic image. Perhaps the meaning of all human activity lies in artistic consciousness, in the pointless and selfless creative act? Perhaps our capacity to create is evidence that we ourselves were created in the image and likeness of God?

— Sculpting in Time

== Cinematic style ==
In a 1962 interview, Tarkovsky argued: "All art, of course, is intellectual, but for me, all the arts, and cinema even more so, must above all be emotional and act upon the heart." His films are characterized by metaphysical themes, extremely long takes, and images often considered by critics to be of exceptional beauty. Recurring motifs are dreams, memory, childhood, running water accompanied by fire, rain indoors, reflections, levitation, and characters re-appearing in the foreground of long panning movements of the camera. He once said: "Juxtaposing a person with an environment that is boundless, collating him with a countless number of people passing by close to him and far away, relating a person to the whole world, that is the meaning of cinema."

Tarkovsky incorporated levitation scenes into several of his films, most notably Solaris. To him these scenes possess great power and are used for their photogenic value and magical inexplicability. Water, clouds, and reflections were used by him for their surreal beauty and photogenic value, as well as their symbolism, such as waves or the forms of brooks or running water. Bells and candles are also frequent symbols. These are symbols of film, sight and sound, and Tarkovsky's film frequently has themes of self-reflection.

Tarkovsky developed a theory of cinema that he called "sculpting in time". By this he meant that the unique characteristic of cinema as a medium was to take our experience of time and alter it. Unedited movie footage transcribes time in real time. By using long takes and few cuts in his films, he aimed to give the viewers a sense of time passing, time lost, and the relationship of one moment in time to another.

Up to, and including, his film Mirror, Tarkovsky focused his cinematic works on exploring this theory. After Mirror, he announced that he would focus his work on exploring the dramatic unities proposed by Aristotle: a single concentrated action, happening in a single place, within the span of a single day.

Several of Tarkovsky's films have color or black-and-white sequences. This first occurs in the otherwise monochrome Andrei Rublev, which features a color epilogue of Rublev's authentic religious icon paintings. All of his films afterwards contain monochrome, and in Stalker's case sepia sequences, while otherwise being in color. In 1966, in an interview conducted shortly after finishing Andrei Rublev, Tarkovsky dismissed color film as a "commercial gimmick" and cast doubt on the idea that contemporary films meaningfully use color. He claimed that in everyday life one does not consciously notice colors most of the time, and that color should therefore be used in film mainly to emphasize certain moments, but not all the time, as this distracts the viewer. To him, films in color were like moving paintings or photographs, which are too beautiful to be a realistic depiction of life.

Director Ingmar Bergman commented on Tarkovsky:

My discovery of Tarkovsky's first film was like a miracle. Suddenly, I found myself standing at the door of a room the keys of which had until then, never been given to me. It was a room I had always wanted to enter and where he was moving freely and fully at ease. I felt encountered and stimulated: someone was expressing what I had always wanted to say without knowing how. Tarkovsky is for me the greatest, the one who invented a new language, true to the nature of film, as it captures life as a reflection, life as a dream.

Contrarily, however, Bergman conceded the truth in the claim made by a critic who wrote that "with Autumn Sonata Bergman does Bergman", adding: "Tarkovsky began to make Tarkovsky films, and that Fellini began to make Fellini films [...] Buñuel nearly always made Buñuel films." This pastiche of one's own work has been derogatorily termed as "self-karaoke".

=== Vadim Yusov ===
Tarkovsky worked in close collaboration with cinematographer Vadim Yusov from 1958 to 1972, and much of the visual style of Tarkovsky's films can be attributed to this collaboration. Tarkovsky would spend two days preparing for Yusov to film a single long take, and due to the preparation, usually only a single take was needed.

=== Sven Nykvist ===
In his last film, The Sacrifice, Tarkovsky worked with cinematographer Sven Nykvist, who had worked on many films with director Ingmar Bergman. (Nykvist was not alone: several people involved in the production had previously collaborated with Bergman, notably lead actor Erland Josephson, who had also acted for Tarkovsky in Nostalghia.) Nykvist complained that Tarkovsky would frequently look through the camera and even direct actors through it, but ultimately stated that choosing to work with Tarkovsky was one of the best choices he had ever made.

== Filmography ==
Tarkovsky is mainly known as a film director. During his career he directed seven feature films, as well as three shorts from his time at VGIK. His features are:

- Ivan's Childhood (1962)
- Andrei Rublev (1966)
- Solaris (1972)
- Mirror (1975)
- Stalker (1979)
- Nostalghia (1983)
- The Sacrifice (1986)

He also wrote several screenplays. Furthermore, he directed the play Hamlet for the stage in Moscow, directed the opera Boris Godunov in London, and he directed a radio production of the short story Turnabout by William Faulkner. He also wrote Sculpting in Time, a book on film theory.

Tarkovsky's first feature film was Ivan's Childhood in 1962. He then directed Andrei Rublev in 1966, Solaris in 1972, Mirror in 1975 and Stalker in 1979. The documentary Voyage in Time was produced in Italy in 1982, as was Nostalghia in 1983. His last film The Sacrifice was produced in Sweden in 1986. Tarkovsky was personally involved in writing the screenplays for all his films, sometimes with a cowriter. Tarkovsky once said that a director who realizes somebody else's screenplay without being involved in it becomes a mere illustrator, resulting in dead and monotonous films.

== Publications ==
- Sculpting in Time. University of Texas Press, 1986. ISBN 0-292-77624-1.
- Time Within Time: The Diaries 1970–1986. Seagull, 1989. ISBN 9780857424921. Translated by Kitty Hunter-Blair.
- Collected Screenplays. London: Faber & Faber, 2003. ISBN 978-0571142668.
- Instant Light, Tarkovsky Polaroids. London: Thames and Hudson, 2006. ISBN 9780500286142. A book of 60 photographs taken by Tarkovsky in Russia and Italy between 1979 and 1984. Edited by Italian photographer Giovanni Chiaramonte and Tarkovsky's son Andrey A. Tarkovsky.
- Bright, bright day. Tarkovsky Foundation and White Space Gallery, 2008. A book of Polaroids edited by Stephen Gill. ISBN 978-0955739415. Edition of 3000 copies.
- Tarkovsky: Films, Stills, Polaroids & Writings. London: Thames and Hudson, 2019. ISBN 978-0500022597.

== Unproduced screenplays ==
=== Concentrate ===
Concentrate (Концентрат, Kontsentrat) is a never-filmed 1958 screenplay by Tarkovsky. The screenplay is based on Tarkovsky's year in the taiga as a member of a research expedition, prior to his enrollment in film school. It's about the leader of a geological expedition, who waits for the boat that brings back the concentrates collected by the expedition. The expedition is surrounded by mystery, and its purpose is a state secret.

Although some authors claim that the screenplay was filmed, according to Marina Tarkovskaya, Tarkovsky's sister (and wife of Aleksandr Gordon, a fellow student of Tarkovsky during his film school years) the screenplay was never filmed. Tarkovsky wrote the screenplay during his entrance examination at the State Institute of Cinematography (VGIK) in a single sitting. He earned the highest possible grade, "excellent" (отлично) for this work. In 1994, fragments of Concentrate were filmed and used in the documentary Andrei Tarkovsky's Taiga Summer by Marina Tarkovskaya and Aleksandr Gordon.

=== Hoffmanniana ===
"Hoffmanniana"
- Short story by Andrei Tarkovsky
- Original title: Гофманиана
- Country: USSR
- Language: Russian

Publication
- Media type: Screenplay
- Publication date: 1976

Hoffmanniana (Гофманиана) is a never-filmed 1974 screenplay by Tarkovsky. The screenplay is based on the life and work of German author E. T. A. Hoffmann. In 1974, an acquaintance from Tallinnfilm approached Tarkovsky to write a screenplay on a German theme. Tarkovsky considered Thomas Mann and E. T. A. Hoffmann, and also thought about Ibsen's Peer Gynt. In the end Tarkovsky signed a contract for a script based on the life and work of Hoffmann. He planned to write the script during the summer of 1974 at his dacha. Writing was not without difficulty, less than a month before the deadline he had not written a single page. He finally finished the project in late 1974 and submitted the final script to Tallinnfilm in October.

Although the script was well received by the officials at Tallinnfilm, it was the consensus that no one but Tarkovsky would be able to direct it. The script was sent to Goskino in February 1976, and although approval was granted for proceeding with making the film, the screenplay was never realized. In 1984, during the time of his exile in the West, Tarkovsky revisited the screenplay and made a few changes. He also considered to finally direct a film based on the screenplay but ultimately dropped this idea.

== Films about Tarkovsky ==
- Voyage in Time (1983): documents the travels in Italy of Andrei Tarkovsky in preparation for the making of his film Nostalghia, co-directed with Tonino Guerra.
- Tarkovsky: A Poet in the Cinema (1984): directed by Donatella Baglivo.
- Moscow Elegy (1987), a documentary/homage to Tarkovsky by Aleksandr Sokurov.
- Auf der Suche nach der verlorenen Zeit (1988): Andrej Tarkowskijs Exil und Tod. Documentary directed by Ebbo Demant. Germany.
- One Day in the Life of Andrei Arsenevich (1999): French documentary film directed by Chris Marker.
- Andrey (2006): a film by Nariné Mktchyan and Arsen Azatyan about Tarkovsky visiting Armenia.
- Tarkovsky: Time Within Time (2015): documentary by P. J. Letofsky.
- Andrei Tarkovsky: A Cinema Prayer (2019): a poetic documentary by Tarkovsky's son Andrei A. Tarkovsky.

== Accolades ==
Numerous awards were bestowed on Tarkovsky throughout his lifetime.

- At the Venice Film Festival, the Golden Lion for Ivan's Childhood
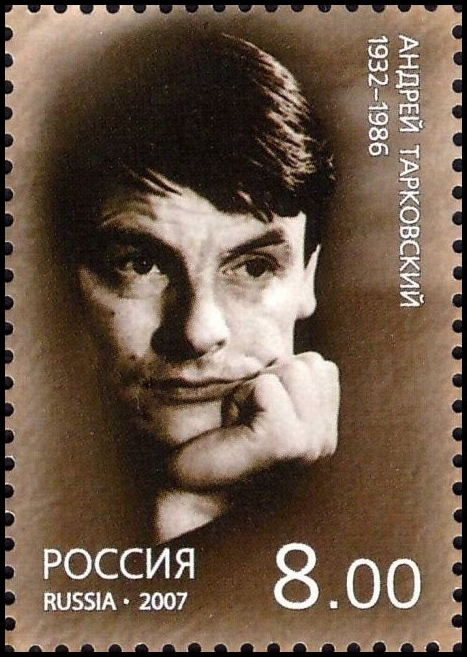
- Russian stamp, 2007
  At the Cannes Film Festival, the FIPRESCI prize three times, the Prize of the Ecumenical Jury three times (more than any other director), the Grand Prix Spécial du Jury twice, and the Best Director award once. He was also nominated for the Palme d'Or three times.
- In 1987, the BAFTA Award for Best Foreign Language Film of the British Academy of Film and Television Arts for The Sacrifice.

Under the influence of Glasnost and Perestroika, Tarkovsky was finally recognized in the Soviet Union in the autumn of 1986, shortly before his death, by a retrospective of his films in Moscow. After his death, an entire issue of the film magazine Iskusstvo Kino was devoted to Tarkovsky. In their obituaries, the film committee of the Council of Ministers of the Soviet Union and the Union of Soviet Film Makers expressed their sorrow that Tarkovsky had to spend the last years of his life in exile.

Posthumously, he was awarded the Lenin Prize in 1990, one of the highest state honors in the Soviet Union. In 1989, the Andrei Tarkovsky Memorial Prize was established, with its first recipient being the Russian animator Yuri Norstein. In three consecutive events, the Moscow International Film Festival awarded the Andrei Tarkovsky Award in 1993, 1995, and 1997.

In 1996, the Andrei Tarkovsky Museum opened in Yuryevets, his childhood town. A minor planet, 3345 Tarkovskij, discovered by Soviet astronomer Lyudmila Karachkina in 1982, has been named after him.

Tarkovsky has been the subject of several documentaries. Most notable is the 1988 documentary Moscow Elegy, by Russian film director Alexander Sokurov. Sokurov's own work has been heavily influenced by Tarkovsky. The film consists mostly of narration over stock footage from Tarkovsky's films. Directed by Andrei Tarkovsky is a 1988 documentary film by Michal Leszczylowski, an editor of the film The Sacrifice. Film director Chris Marker produced the television documentary One Day in the Life of Andrei Arsenevich as an homage to Andrei Tarkovsky in 2000.

At the entrance to the Gerasimov Institute of Cinematography in Moscow, there is a monument that includes statues of Tarkovsky, Gennady Shpalikov and Vasily Shukshin.

== Reception and legacy ==
Andrei Tarkovsky and his works have received praise from many filmmakers, critics and thinkers.

The Swedish filmmaker Ingmar Bergman was quoted as saying: "Tarkovsky for me is the greatest [of us all], the one who invented a new language, true to the nature of film, as it captures life as a reflection, life as a dream".

The Japanese filmmaker Akira Kurosawa remarked on Tarkovsky's films as saying: "His unusual sensitivity is both overwhelming and astounding. It almost reaches a pathological intensity. Probably there is no equal among film directors alive now." Kurosawa also commented: "I love all of Tarkovsky's films. I love his personality and all his works. Every cut from his films is a marvelous image in itself. But the finished image is nothing more than the imperfect accomplishment of his idea. His ideas are only realized in part. And he had to make do with it."

The Iranian filmmaker Abbas Kiarostami remarked that: "Tarkovsky's works separate me completely from physical life, and are the most spiritual films I have seen".

The Polish filmmaker Krzysztof Kieślowski commented that: "Andrei Tarkovsky was one of the greatest directors of recent years," and regarded Tarkovsky's film Ivan's Childhood as an influence on his own work.

The Turkish filmmaker Nuri Bilge Ceylan said that when he first discovered the films of Andrei Tarkovsky as a college student, unsure of what he wanted to do with his life, he was utterly baffled by the lauded Soviet master. He walked out of a screening of Solaris at the halfway point, and stopped a VHS tape of Mirror at a similar juncture. Today, he considers the latter to be the greatest film ever made. "I've seen it maybe 20 times," he says.

The Armenian filmmaker Sergei Parajanov remarked that watching Tarkovsky's film, Ivan's Childhood was his main inspiration to become a filmmaker by saying: "I did not know how to do anything and I would not have done anything if there had not been Ivan's Childhood".

The Austrian filmmaker Michael Haneke voted for Mirror on his top 10 films in the 2002 Sight & Sound directors' poll and later said that he has seen the picture at least 25 times.

The American filmmaker Stan Brakhage said that: "I personally think that the three greatest tasks for film in the 20th century are (1) To make the epic, that is to tell the tales of the tribes of the world. (2) To keep it personal, because only in the eccentricities of our personal lives do we have any chances at the truth. (3) To do the dream work, that is, to illuminate the borders of the unconscious. The only filmmaker I know that does all these three things equally in every film he makes is Andrei Tarkovsky, and that's why I think he's the greatest living narrative filmmaker."

The German filmmaker Wim Wenders dedicated his film Wings of Desire to Tarkovsky (along with François Truffaut and Yasujirō Ozu).

The French filmmaker Chris Marker directed a documentary film as a homage to Tarkovsky called One Day in the Life of Andrei Arsenevich and used Tarkovsky's concept of "The Zone" (from the film, Stalker) for his 1983 film essay, Sans Soleil.

The Greek filmmaker Theo Angelopoulos regarded Tarkovsky's film Stalker as one of the films that influenced him.

The Polish filmmaker Andrzej Żuławski remarked that: "If anybody influenced anybody, it's me being influenced by Tarkovsky, not the reverse", and called Tarkovsky's film Andrei Rublev a "masterpiece".

The Greek-Australian filmmaker Alex Proyas was "extremely influenced" by Tarkovsky's work and cited Stalker as one of his favorite films.

The French philosopher Jean-Paul Sartre highly praised Tarkovsky's film Ivan's Childhood, saying that it was one of the most beautiful films he had ever seen.

The Japanese anime filmmaker Mamoru Oshii, known for his works such as Ghost in the Shell, was influenced by Tarkovsky.

The Indian-born British American novelist Salman Rushdie praised Tarkovsky and his work Solaris by calling it "a sci-fi masterpiece".

Film historian Steven Dillon says that much of subsequent film was deeply influenced by the films of Tarkovsky.

Mexican filmmaker Alejandro González Iñarritu is a huge fan of Tarkovsky. He once said in an interview: "Andrei Rublev is maybe my favorite film ever", and in another interview, he added: "I remember, the first time I saw a Tarkovsky film, I was shocked by it. I did not know what to do. I was shocked by it. I was fascinated, because suddenly I realized that film could have so many more layers to it than what I had imagined before". There are many direct references and hidden tributes to Tarkovsky's movies in Iñarritu's 2015 Oscar-winning drama The Revenant.

Danish film director Lars von Trier is a fervent admirer of Tarkovsky. He dedicated his 2009 film Antichrist to him, and, while discussing it with critic David Jenkins, asked: "Have you seen Mirror? I was hypnotised! I've seen it 20 times. It's the closest thing I've got to a religion – to me he is a god".

The Japanese composer Ryuichi Sakamoto was an admirer of Tarkovsky's work, describing his penultimate solo album, async as "a soundtrack for an imaginary Tarkovsky film." On Tarkovsky's overall influence on his own work, Sakamoto stated, "As I've been making music and trying to go deeper and deeper, I was finally able to understand what the Tarkovsky movies are about — how symphonic they are — it's almost music. Not just the sounds — it's a symphony of moving images and sounds. They are more complex than music."

=== Film festivals ===
Two film festivals have been named in his honor:

- International Human Rights Film Festival "Stalker", named after the film held annually in Moscow and regional centres since 1995
- International Film Festival "Zerkalo", named after Andrei Tarkovsky (meaning "mirror"), "for fans of intellectual cinema"; also known as Tarkovsky Film festival – Zerkalo, Zerkalo International Film Festival, Andrei Tarkovsky Zerkalo International Film Festival, Tarkovskyfest or simply Zerkalo, The festival is organized by a committee headed by Mikhail Men, governor of Ivanovo Oblast. Sister of Andrei Tarkovsky, Marina Tarkovsky was one of the co-founders and organizers. From 2010 the festival was directed by Pavel Lungin. In 2020, the president of the festival was Russian director Sergei Bodrov. Owing to the COVID-19 pandemic in Russia, the 14th edition was held online in 2020. The festival awards a number of prizes, including the Special Award for Contribution to Andrei Tarkovsky's Cinema. Held in Ivanovo since 2007, the festival is held in June and/or July each year, with the 19th edition scheduled from the 26th of June to the 1st of July, to be held in various cities in the Ivanovo region, with special screenings in Moscow.

== Personal life ==
- Father: Arseny Tarkovsky (June 25, 1907 – May 27, 1989), poet.
- Mother: Maria Ivanovna Tarkovskaya-Vishnyakova (November 5, 1907 – October 5, 1979).
- Sister: Marina Tarkovskaya (October 3, 1934 – June 11, 2024).
- First wife: Irma Raush (born 21 April 1938), marriage from 1957 to 1970.
- Son: Arseny (born 1962), with Irma Raush.
- Second wife: Larisa Tarkovskaya (February 1, 1933 – January 19, 1998), marriage from 1970 till the end of Tarkovsky’s life in 1986. She worked as an assistant on the film "Andrei Rublev".
- Son: Andrei (born August 7, 1970), with Larisa Tarkovskaya. He now lives in Florence and heads Tarkovsky Fund.
- Son: Alexander (born September 4, 1986), with Berit Hemmighütt. In 1985, during Tarkovsky’s work on film "The Sacrifice" in Sweden, he had a love affair with Norwegian Berit Hemmighütt, who on September 4, 1986 gave birth to their son Alexander, who bears the double surname Tarkovsky-Hemmighütt and now lives in Denmark with his son Wilhelm Tarkovsky-Hemmighütt, Tarkovsky’s grandson.

== See also ==
- European art cinema
- Slow cinema
- Moscow International Film Festival
