= Zavrazhye, Kadyysky District, Kostroma Oblast =

Zavrazhye Завражье
- Selo
- Location within Kostroma Oblast Location within Russia
- Coordinates: 57°24′34″N 43°09′10″E
- Country: Russia
- Region: Kostroma Oblast
- District: Kadyysky District
- Time zone: UTC+3:00

Zavrazhye (Russian: Завражье) is a rural locality (a selo) in Kadyysky District, Kostroma Oblast, Russia. Population: 472 (2010 census); 434 (2002 census); . Director Andrey Tarkovsky was born in this village.
