= Time Within Time: The Diaries 1970–1986 =

Autobiography of Andrej Tarkovski

- Cover of the Calcutta edition
- Author: Andrei Tarkovsky
- Genre: Autobiography
- Publisher: Seagull Books
- Publication date: 1991
- ISBN: 81-7046-083-2
- OCLC: 25088374
- Dewey Decimal: 791.43/0233/092 B 20
- LC Class: PN1998.3.T36 A3 1991

Time Within Time: The Diaries 1970–1986 (Original Russian title: Martyrolog) are the diaries of the Russian filmmaker Andrei Tarkovsky. They cover his life and work in the Soviet Union and the time of his exile in Western Europe.

== The Diaries ==
Tarkovsky called his diaries Martyrolog (Translated by Tarkovsky's official English translator Kitty Hunter-Blair as Martyrology). He said about this title in 1974: "Pretentious and false as a title, but let it stay as a reminder of my ineradicable, futile worthlessness." The diaries are deeply personal and were intended mainly for Tarkovsky himself. They cover his life and work in the Soviet Union and during the time of his exile. Sometimes entries are seemingly trivial, as for example shopping lists or entries on his health. Another frequent topic are other film directors or artists, which Tarkovsky generally regarded with a negative attitude. At other times, Tarkovsky discusses philosophical or film theoretical questions, not necessarily related to day-to-day events. Tarkovsky kept his diary until shortly before his death on December 29, 1986. The last entry was on December 15, 1986. His last words were "But now I have no strength left – that is the problem".

== Translations ==
The diaries have been translated from its Russian original into 15 different languages, sometimes with significant differences. The diaries were first published in 1989 in German. The Russian original was not officially published until 2008.

The first English edition was published in 1991, translated by Kitty Hunter-Blair, who also translated Sculpting in Time. This edition is also known as the Calcutta edition as it was published first in India. Other notable translations include the French and the Polish editions, both of which are among the most complete editions of the diaries. Other translations include the Czech, Italian, Japanese and Mongolian editions of the diaries.
