= Erland Josephson =

Swedish actor (1923–2012)

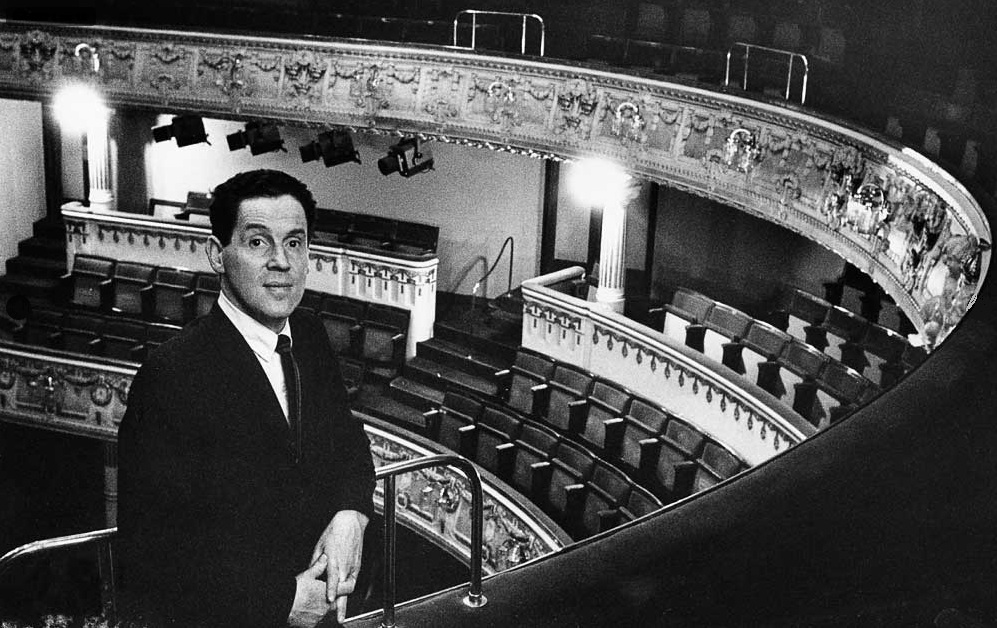
- Josephson as newly appointed director of the Royal Dramatic Theatre in 1965.
- Born: Erland Josephson; 15 June 1923; Stockholm, Sweden
- Died: 25 February 2012 (aged 88); Stockholm, Sweden
- Occupations: Actor; author
- Years active: 1946–2006
- Spouses: Kerstin Wahlbom (m. 1947–1951); Kristina Adolphson (m. 1959–1989); Ulla Åberg (m. 2000)
- Partner(s): Annika Tretow; Barbro Larsson
- Children: 2 (with Tretow); 1 (with Larsson); 2 (with Adolphson)

Erland Josephson (Swedish pronunciation: [ˈæ̌ːɭand ˈjûːsɛfˌsɔn]; 15 June 1923 – 25 February 2012) was a Swedish actor and author. He was best known by international audiences for his work in films directed by Ingmar Bergman, Andrei Tarkovsky, Theo Angelopoulos, and Liv Ullmann.

== Life and career ==
Josephson was born on the island of Kungsholmen, in Stockholm, Sweden, as the son of Maud Ellen Gabrielle (née Boheman) and Gunnar Josephson, a bookseller of Jewish descent, in 1923. His maternal uncle was diplomat Erik Boheman, and his maternal great-grandfather was entomologist Carl Henrik Boheman.

Josephson was the leader of the Royal Dramatic Theatre in Stockholm from 1966 to 1975. He also published novels, short stories, poetry and drama, and was the director of several films. In 1980, he directed and starred in the film Marmalade Revolution, which was entered into the 30th Berlin International Film Festival. In 1986, he starred in The Sacrifice and won the award for Best Actor at the 22nd Guldbagge Awards.

He was the Swedish voice of the Narrator in Disney's Beauty and the Beast.

== Selected filmography ==
- It Rains on Our Love (1946, directed by Ingmar Bergman) as Clerk at the vicar's office (uncredited)
- Eva (1948, directed by Gustaf Molander) as Karl, Josef's Brother (uncredited)
- To Joy (1950, directed by Ingmar Bergman) as Bertil (uncredited)
- Stage Entrance (1956, directed by Bengt Ekerot) as Bergkvist, director / Narrator
- Som man bäddar... (1957, directed by Börje Larsson) as Erik, doctor
- Brink of Life (1958, directed by Ingmar Bergman) as Anders Ellius
- The Magician (1958, directed by Ingmar Bergman) as Consul Egerman
- Hour of the Wolf (1968, directed by Ingmar Bergman) as Baron von Merkens
- The Girls (1968, directed by Mai Zetterling) as Carl
- Eva – den utstötta (1969, directed by Torgny Wickman)
- The Passion of Anna (1969, directed by Ingmar Bergman) as Elis Vergérus / Himself
- Cries and Whispers (1972, directed by Ingmar Bergman) as David
- Scenes from a Marriage (1974, directed by Ingmar Bergman) as Johan
- The Magic Flute (1975, TV Movie, directed by Ingmar Bergman) as Man in Audience (uncredited)
- Monismanien 1995 (1975, directed by Kenne Fant) as Teacher
- Face to Face (1976, directed by Ingmar Bergman) as Dr. Tomas Jacobi
- I Am Afraid (1977, directed by Damiano Damiani) as Judge Cancedda
- Games of Love and Loneliness (1977, directed by Anja Breien) as Doncker
- Beyond Good and Evil (1977, directed by Liliana Cavani) as Friedrich Nietzsche
- En och en (1978, directed by Erland Josephson) as Uncle Dan
- Autumn Sonata (1978, directed by Ingmar Bergman) as Josef
- The First Polka (1979, directed by Klaus Emmerich) as Leo Maria Piontek
- To Forget Venice (1979, directed by Franco Brusati) as Nicky
- Marmalade Revolution (1980, directed by himself) as Karl Henrik Eller
- Kärleken (1980, directed by Theodor Kallifatides) as Andreas
- The Melody Haunts My Memory (1981, directed by Rajko Grlić) as Rudolf
- Peacetime in Paris (1981, directed by Predrag Golubović)
- Montenegro (1981, directed by Dušan Makavejev) as Martin Jordan
- Variola Vera (1982, directed by Goran Marković) as Dr. Dragutin Kenigsmark
- Fanny and Alexander (1982, directed by Ingmar Bergman) as Isak Jacobi – Jacobis hus
- Eva (1983, directed by Franci Slak) as Oce
- Nostalghia (1983, directed by Andrei Tarkovsky) as Domenico
- The House of the Yellow Carpet (1983, directed by Carlo Lizzani) as The Professor
- Bella Donna (1983, directed by Peter Keglevic) as Max
- After the Rehearsal (1984, TV Movie, directed by Ingmar Bergman) as Henrik Vogler (older)
- Angelas krig (1984, directed by Eija-Elina Bergholm) as Anton Goldberg
- Bakom jalusin (1984, directed by Stig Bjorkman) as Daniel Brenner
- Dirty Story (1984, directed by Jörn Donner) as Gabriel Berggren
- De flyvende djævle (1985, directed by Anders Refn) as Oscar Seidenbaum
- Il giocatore invisibile (1985, directed by Sergio Genni)
- Amorosa (1986, directed by Mai Zetterling) as David Sprengel
- Saving Grace (1986, directed by Robert M. Young) as Monsignor Francesco Ghezzi
- The Sacrifice (1986, directed by Andrei Tarkovsky) as Alexander
- L'ultima mazurka (1986, directed by Gianfranco Bettetini) as Serra
- The Malady of Love (1986, directed by Giorgio Treves) as Robert's Father
- Il giorno prima (1987, directed by Giuliano Montaldo) as Swanson
- The Unbearable Lightness of Being (1988, directed by Philip Kaufman) as The Ambassador
- Le testament d'un poète juif assassiné (1988, directed by Frank Cassenti) as Zupanev
- Hanussen (1988, directed by István Szabó) as Dr. Bettelheim
- Migrations (1989, directed by Aleksandar Petrović) as Episkop
- The Legendary Life of Ernest Hemingway (1989, directed by José María Sánchez) as Clarence Hemingway
- The Dark Sun (1990, directed by Damiano Damiani) as Attorney Belmonte
- Good Evening, Mr. Wallenberg (1990, directed by Kjell Grede) as Rabbinen
- The Wicked (1991, directed by Carlo Lizzani) as Prof. Brokner
- Prospero's Books (1991, directed by Peter Greenaway) as Gonzalo
- Meeting Venus (1991, directed by István Szabó) as Jorge Picabia
- The Ox (1991, directed by Sven Nykvist) as Sigvard Silver
- Den ofrivillige golfaren (1991, directed by Lasse Åberg) as Kritikern
- Holozän (1992, directed by Heinz Bütler, Manfred Eicher) as Geiser
- Sofie (1992, directed by Liv Ullmann) as Sofie's Father
- Dreamplay (1994, directed by Unni Straume) as Blind Man
- Zabraneniat plod (1994, directed by Unni Straume) as Hazainat
- C'è Kim Novak al telefono (1994, directed by Riki Roseo)
- Ulysses' Gaze (1995, directed by Theo Angelopoulos) as Library Curator
- Pakten (1995, directed by Leidulv Risan) as August Lind
- Kristin Lavransdatter (1995, directed by Liv Ullmann) as Broder Edvin
- In the Presence of a Clown (1997, TV Movie, directed by Ingmar Bergman) as Osvald Vogler
- Magnetisörens femte vinter (1999, directed by Morten Henriksen) as Hr. Hofverberg
- Faithless (2000, directed by Liv Ullmann) as Bergman
- Now (2003, Short, directed by Simon Staho) as Jakob (old)
- The Good Pope: Pope John XXIII (2003, TV Movie, directed by Ricky Tognazzi) as Franz Von Papen
- Saraband (2003, TV Movie, directed by Ingmar Bergman) as Johan
- Day and Night (2004, directed by Simon Staho) as Berättare (voice)
- Dobro ustimani mrtvaci (2005, directed by Benjamin Filipovic) as Zaim Kundurevic
- Wellkåmm to Verona (2006, directed by Suzanne Osten) as Joseph

== Bibliography ==
- Cirkel (1946)
- Spegeln och en portvakt (1946)
- Spel med bedrövade artister (1947)
- Ensam och fri (1948)
- Lyssnarpost (1949)
- De vuxna barnen (1952)
- Sällskapslek (1956)
- En berättelse om herr Silberstein (1957)
- Kungen ur leken (1960)
- Benjamin : Generalskan (1963)
- Doktor Meyers sista dagar och Kandidat Nilssons första natt (1964)
- Loppans kvällsvard (1986)
- Konrad på teatern (1987)
- Kameleonterna (1987)
- Färgen : den borgerliga kulturens envisa överlevande (1988)
- Peter åker traktor (1989)
- Rollen : antecknat på turné med Körsbärsträdgården 24/2 – 15/5 1989 (1989)
- Sanningslekar (1990)
- Konrad på gubbdagis : en bilderbok för vuxna (1991)
- Föreställningar (1991)
- Konrad tar semester : en bilderbok för omogna (1993)
- Självporträtt : en egocentrisk dialog (1993)
- Sanningslekar (1994)
- Gubbröra (1994)
- Vita sanningar (1995)
- Svarslös (1996)
- Stockholms Själ (1999)
- Kunskapens scen : ett urval texter (2007)
- Reskamrater : berättelser i all korthet (2009)
- En natt i den svenska sommaren (2011)
