= Steven Dillon (writer and professor) =

Steven Dillon is an author and Professor of English at Bates College in Lewiston, Maine. He is also a film critic and film historian. Dillon's use of the expression "The Solaris Effect", as in the title of his book, referred to the great influence of Andrei Tarkovsky and his films on other film and art. Dillon's use of Solaris refers to the 1972 film by Tarkovsky, only indirectly to the novel by Stanislaw Lem.

Dillon received his B.A. from the University of Colorado in 1982 and his Ph.D. from Yale University in 1988.

Dillon's books include:

- The Solaris Effect: Art and Artifice in Contemporary American Film. University of Texas Press, Austin. 2006 ISBN 0-292-71344-4
- Derek Jarman and Lyric Film. University of Texas Press, Austin. 2004 ISBN 0-292-70224-8
