= Marmalade Revolution =

1980 film

- Directed by: Erland Josephson
- Written by: Erland Josephson
- Produced by: Erland Josephson; Sven Nykvist
- Starring: Erland Josephson
- Cinematography: Sven Nykvist
- Edited by: Sylvia Ingemarsson
- Release date: 11 February 1980
- Running time: 93 minutes
- Country: Sweden
- Language: Swedish

Marmalade Revolution (Swedish: Marmeladupproret) is a 1980 Swedish drama film directed by and starring Erland Josephson. It was entered into the 30th Berlin International Film Festival.

== Cast ==
- Erland Josephson - Karl Henrik Eller
- Bibi Andersson - Anna-Berit
- Marie Göranzon - Maj
- Jan Malmsjö - Edvard
- Charlotta Larsson - Hanna (as Lotta Larsson)
- Ulf Palme - Per Hugo
- Kristina Adolphson - Aina
- Susanna Hellberg - Ellen
- Ingvar Kjellson - Editor
- Meta Velander - Maitre d'
- Börje Ahlstedt - Photographer
- Christina Carlwind - Clerk
- Björn Gustafson - Night Wanderer
- Olof Lundström Orloff - Concierge (as Olof Lundström)
