= Marina Tarkovskaya =

Russian writer and critic (1934–2024)

- Марина Тарковская
- Tarkovskaya in 2022
- Born: Marina Arsenyevna Tarkovskaya; 3 October 1934; Moscow, USSR
- Died: 11 June 2024 (aged 89)
- Education: Moscow State University
- Occupations: Journalist, writer, literary critic
- Writing career
- Language: Russian
- Notable awards: Anti-Booker prize (1999)

Marina Arsenyevna Tarkovskaya (Russian: Марина Арсеньевна Тарковская; 3 October 1934 – 11 June 2024) was a Russian writer and critic. She was born in Moscow on 3 October 1934, and was the younger sister of Andrei Tarkovsky. Tarkovskaya died on 11 June 2024, at the age of 89.
