= Nostalghia =

1983 film by Andrei Tarkovsky

- Italian theatrical release poster
- Russian: Ностальгия
- Directed by: Andrei Tarkovsky
- Written by: Tonino Guerra; Andrei Tarkovsky
- Produced by: Manolo Bolognini; Renzo Rossellini; Daniel Toscan du Plantier
- Starring: Oleg Yankovsky; Erland Josephson; Domiziana Giordano; Patrizia Terreno; Laura Marchi; Delia Boccardo; Milena Vukotic
- Cinematography: Giuseppe Lanci
- Edited by: Erminia Marani; Amedeo Salfa
- Production companies: Sovinfilm; RAI 2
- Distributed by: Gaumont Italia (Italy)
- Release dates: 17 May 1983 (Cannes); 2 June 1983 (Italy)
- Running time: 125 minutes
- Countries: Soviet Union; Italy
- Languages: Russian; Italian
- Budget: £500,000
- Box office: $323,811

Nostalghia (Note: Nostalghia is an Italian transcription of the Russian word ностальгия [nəstɐlʲˈɡʲijə], with the digraph ⟨gh⟩ used to indicate a different consonant from the one in the Italian nostalgia [nostalˈdʒiːa].) (released as Nostalgia in the United Kingdom) is a 1983 drama film directed by Andrei Tarkovsky and starring Oleg Yankovsky, Domiziana Giordano and Erland Josephson. Tarkovsky co-wrote the screenplay with Tonino Guerra.

The film depicts a Russian writer (Oleg Yankovsky) who visits Italy to carry out research about an 18th-century Russian composer, but is stricken by homesickness. The film utilizes autobiographical elements drawn from Tarkovsky's own experiences visiting Italy, and explores themes surrounding the untranslatability of art and culture.

The film won the Prize of the Ecumenical Jury, the prize for Best Director and the FIPRESCI Prize at the 1983 Cannes Film Festival. It received generally positive reviews from critics. Widely regarded as one of Tarkovsky's best works, the film received nine total votes in the Sight and Sound's 2012 poll of the greatest films ever made.

== Plot ==
The Russian writer Andrei Gorchakov travels to Italy to research the life of 18th-century Russian composer Pavel Sosnovsky, who lived there and died by suicide after his return to Russia. He and his comely interpreter Eugenia travel to a convent in the Tuscan countryside, to look at frescoes by Piero della Francesca. Andrei decides at the last minute that he does not want to enter.

Back at their hotel Andrei feels displaced and longs to go back to Russia, but unnamed circumstances seem to get in the way. Eugenia is smitten with Andrei and is offended that he will not sleep with her, claiming that she has a better boyfriend waiting for her.

Andrei meets and befriends a strange man named Domenico, who is famous in the village for trying to cross through the waters of a mineral pool with a lit candle. He claims that when finally achieving it, he will save the world. They both share a feeling of alienation from their surroundings. Andrei later learns that Domenico used to live in a lunatic asylum until the post-fascistic state closed them; Domenico now lives in the street. He also learns that Domenico had a family and was obsessed in keeping them inside his house in order to save them from the end of the world, until they were freed by the local police after seven years. Before leaving, Domenico gives Andrei his candle and asks him if he will cross the waters with the candle for him.

During a dream-like sequence, Andrei sees himself as Domenico and has visions of his wife, Eugenia, and Mary, mother of Jesus as being all one and the same. Andrei seems to cut his research short and plans to leave for Russia, until he gets a call from Eugenia, who wishes to say goodbye and tell him that she met Domenico in Rome by chance and that he asked if Andrei has walked across the pool himself as he promised. Andrei says he has, although that is not true. Eugenia is with her boyfriend, but he seems uninterested in her and appears to be involved in dubious business affairs. Later, Domenico delivers a speech on top the equestrian statue of Marcus Aurelius on the Capitoline Hill about the need of mankind of being true brothers and sisters and to return to a simpler way of life. Finally, he plays the fourth movement of Beethoven's Ninth Symphony and immolates himself. An onlooker imitates the action of him writhing on the ground in agony, while Eugenia arrives too late, along with the police.

Meanwhile, Andrei returns to the mineral pool in Bagno Vignoni (Val d'Orcia) to fulfill his promise, only to find that the pool has been drained. He enters the empty pool and repeatedly attempts to walk from one end to the other without letting the candle extinguish, as he experiences signs of his illness. When he finally achieves his goal, he collapses and dies. The final shot shows Andrei and a dog resting on the ground of Abbey of San Galgano, with a countryside with Gorchakov's house in the background.

== Cast ==
- Oleg Yankovsky as Andrei Gorchakov (credited as Oleg Jankovsky)
- Erland Josephson as Domenico
- Domiziana Giordano as Eugenia
- Delia Boccardo as Domenico's Wife
- Patrizia Terreno as Andrei's Wife
- Laura De Marchi as Chambermaid

== Production ==
This was Andrei Tarkovsky's first film directed outside of the Soviet Union. It was to be filmed in Italy with the support of Mosfilm, with most of the dialogue in Italian. The film was in pre-production as far back as 1980. Initially the film was titled Viaggio in Italia (Voyage to Italy), but since there was already a film Journey to Italy (1954) by Roberto Rossellini, starring Ingrid Bergman, that bore that name, they searched for something else, eventually deciding upon Nostalghia. When Mosfilm support was withdrawn, Tarkovsky used part of the budget provided by Italian State Television and French film company Gaumont to complete the film in Italy and cut some Russian scenes from the script, while recreating Russian locations for other scenes in Italy. Luciano Tovoli was considered for director of photography, although ultimately Giuseppe Lanci shot the film, though Tovoli would take that role in Tarkovsky’s 1982 documentary Tempo di Viaggio, or Voyage in Time.

Donatella Baglivo filmed a ninety-minute documentary on the making of the film titled Andrei Tarkovsky in Nostalghia (1984), which includes interviews with cast and crew.

=== Casting ===
Anatoly Solonitsyn was initially cast as Andrei Gorchakov, but died from cancer in 1982, forcing Tarkovsky to seek a new protagonist. Tarkovsky eventually decided upon Oleg Yankovsky, who had appeared in his 1975 film Mirror.

=== Locations ===
Several scenes of the film were set in the countryside of Tuscany and northern Lazio; as the Abbey of San Galgano, the spas of Bagno Vignoni, the Orcia Valley, in the Province of Siena, the mysterious crypt of the Chiesa di San Pietro (Tuscania) and the flooded Church of Santa Maria in San Vittorino of Cittaducale, in the Province of Rieti.

=== Style ===
Similarly to Tarkovsky's previous films, Nostalghia utilizes long takes, dream sequences, and minimal story. Of his use of dream sequences, to the question asked by Gian Luigi Rondi: “A realism of dream, like that of Mirror?” Tarkovsky answered: “There isn’t 'realism' on the one hand, and on the other hand (in contrast, in contradiction) 'dreams.' We spend a third of our life asleep (and thus dreaming): what is there that is more real than dreams?”

Tarkovsky spoke of the profound form of nostalgia which he believes is unique to Russians when traveling abroad, comparing it to a disease, "an illness that drains away the strength of the soul, the capacity to work, the pleasure of living", but also, "a profound compassion that binds us not so much with our own privation, our longing, our separation, but rather with the suffering of others, a passionate empathy."

Tarkovsky's goal in Nostalghia, in terms of style, was to portray the soul, the memory, of Italy, of which it felt to him being there. When he visited Italy to begin studying the project of Nostalghia with Tonino Guerra, as they visited cities, Tonino would show him Renaissance architecture, art, monuments, and he admired them, and would take notes, but what struck him the most was the sky, the blue sky, black sky, with clouds, with the sun, at dawn, at noon, in the evening. A sky, he said, is always simply just that, but a change in the hour of the day, the wind, climate, can have it speak to you in a different way, with love, violence, longing, fear, etc. Cinema, he said, can give these "ways" back to you and that it must, with courage, and honesty, always starting from the real.

According to Tarkovsky, while shooting the film he realized that he would be able to express "something distinctive", which he believed he couldn't in his previous films – for only then he had become aware that "a film can make the inner life of its author visible", and, thereby, he "expanded into [himself]."

=== Music ===
The film features music by Ludwig van Beethoven, and Giuseppe Verdi (Requiem), as well as Russian folk songs. Beethoven's Ninth Symphony is featured both during Andrei's visit at Domenico's home and during his demonstration in Rome.

== Home video ==
Nostalghia had its first home video release in North America by Fox Lorber in 1997, who licensed it to The Criterion Collection for a Laserdisc release. Its transfer would be re-used when Fox Lorber released the film on DVD the next year.

Like many other films by Tarkovsky, it was released on DVD by RusCiCo on 28 June 2004; unlike RusCiCo's other DVD releases, though, it was produced for the domestic market in Russia, being locked to DVD region 5 and only featuring Russian subtitles.

The film was released on Blu-ray in the United States by Kino Lorber (being licensed to Mongrel Media in Canada) on 21 January 2014, Curzon Artificial Eye in the United Kingdom on 19 September 2016, and by Llamentol in Spain on 20 September 2023 (albeit on a burnt BD-R). Kino Lorber would later release the film on 4K Ultra HD in 2024, with the Blu-ray that comes with it (and available separately) also featuring Voyage in Time and an interview with cinematographer Giuseppe Lanci.

== Reception and legacy ==
Vincent Canby of The New York Times said that Tarkovsky "may well be a film poet but he's a film poet with a tiny vocabulary. [...] Nothing happens." Dave Kehr was mildly positive, considering it to be "packed with imagery that seems at once hopelessly obscure and crushingly obvious" while also arguing that the work "does succeed in inducing some kind of trance." The film won the Prize of the Ecumenical Jury, the prize for Best Director (Grand Prix du cinéma de creation, shared with Robert Bresson) and the FIPRESCI Prize at the 1983 Cannes Film Festival. Soviet authorities prevented the film from winning the Palme d'Or, a fact that hardened Tarkovsky's resolve to never work in the Soviet Union again.

Today, it is one of Tarkovsky's lesser-known works. In 2010, scholar Thomas Redwood wrote that "critics on the whole have tended to ignore the film. Relatively little has been written about Nostalghia and even less has been understood of it." Nostalghia has an approval rating of 89% on review aggregator website Rotten Tomatoes, based on 27 reviews, and an average rating of 8.4/10. The website's critical consensus states, "Nostalgia demands patience—and rewards the investment with a hypnotic viewing experience that finds Tarkovsky in gratifyingly uncompromising form." Metacritic, which uses a weighted average, assigned the film a score of 78 out of 100, based on 10 critics, indicating "generally favorable" reviews. The film received nine total votes in the 2012 Sight & Sound polls of the greatest films ever made.

In the 2016 video game The Witness, the player can encounter a theatre where one of the short video clips features the ending of Nostalghia.
