= Ivan's Childhood =

1962 film by Andrei Tarkovsky

Ivan's Childhood Иваново детство
- Theatrical release poster
- Directed by: Andrei Tarkovsky
- Screenplay by: Vladimir Bogomolov; Andrei Konchalovsky; Mikhail Papava; Andrei Tarkovsky (uncredited)
- Based on: Ivan by Vladimir Bogomolov
- Starring: Nikolai Burlyayev; Valentin Zubkov; Evgeny Zharikov; Stepan Krylov; Nikolai Grinko
- Cinematography: Vadim Yusov
- Edited by: Lyudmila Feiginova
- Music by: Vyacheslav Ovchinnikov
- Production company: Mosfilm
- Release date: 6 April 1962
- Running time: 94 minutes
- Country: Soviet Union
- Language: Russian

Ivan's Childhood (Russian: Ива́ново де́тство, romanized: Ivanovo detstvo), sometimes released as My Name Is Ivan in the US, is a 1962 Soviet war drama film directed by Andrei Tarkovsky. Co-written by Mikhail Papava, Andrei Konchalovsky and an uncredited Tarkovsky, it is based on Vladimir Bogomolov's 1957 short story "Ivan". The film features child actor Nikolai Burlyayev along with Valentin Zubkov, Evgeny Zharikov, Stepan Krylov, Nikolai Grinko, and Tarkovsky's then wife Irma Raush.

Ivan's Childhood tells the story of orphaned boy Ivan, whose parents were killed by the invading German forces, and his experiences during World War II. Ivan's Childhood was one of several Soviet films of its period, such as The Cranes Are Flying and Ballad of a Soldier, that looked at the human cost of war and did not glorify the war experience as did films produced before the Khrushchev Thaw. In a 1962 interview, Tarkovsky stated that in making the film he wanted to "convey all [his] hatred of war", and that he chose childhood "because it is what contrasts most with war."

Ivan's Childhood was Tarkovsky's first feature film. It won him critical acclaim and made him internationally known. It won the Golden Lion at the Venice Film Festival and the Golden Gate Award at the San Francisco International Film Festival, both in 1962. The film was also selected as the Soviet entry for the Best Foreign Language Film at the 36th Academy Awards, but was not accepted as a nominee. Famous filmmakers such as Ingmar Bergman, Sergei Parajanov and Krzysztof Kieślowski praised the film and cited it as an influence on their work.

== Plot summary ==
After a brief dream sequence, Ivan Bondarev, a 12-year-old Russian boy, wakes up and crosses a war-torn landscape to a swamp, then swims across a river. On the other side, he is seized by Russian soldiers and brought to the young Lieutenant Galtsev, who interrogates him. The boy insists that he call "Number 51 at Headquarters" and report his presence. Galtsev is reluctant, but when he eventually makes the call, he is told by Lieutenant-Colonel Gryaznov to give the boy a pencil and paper to make his report, which will be given the highest priority, and to treat him well. Through a series of dream sequences and conversations between different characters, it is revealed that Ivan's mother and sister (and probably his father, a border guard) have been killed by German soldiers. He got away and joined a group of partisans. When the group was surrounded, they put him on a plane. After the escape, he was sent to a boarding school, but he ran away and joined an army unit under the command of Gryaznov.

Burning for revenge, Ivan insists on fighting on the front line. Taking advantage of his small size, he is successful on reconnaissance missions. Gryaznov and the other soldiers grow fond of him and want to send him to a military school. They give up their idea when Ivan tries to run away and rejoin the partisans. He is determined to avenge the death of his family and others, such as those killed at the Maly Trostenets extermination camp (which he mentions that he has seen).

Finally, Kholin and Galtsev ferry Ivan across the river late at night. He disappears through the swampy forest. The others return to the other bank after cutting down the bodies of two Soviet scouts hanged by the Germans.

The final scenes then switch to Berlin under Soviet occupation after the fall of the Third Reich. Captain Kholin has been killed in action. Galtsev finds a document showing that Ivan was caught and hanged by the Germans. As Galtsev enters the execution room, a final flashback of Ivan's childhood shows the young boy running across a beach after a little girl in happier times. The final image is of a dead tree on the beach.

== Cast ==
- Nikolai Burlyayev as Ivan Bondarev
- Valentin Zubkov as Capt. Kholin
- Evgeny Zharikov as Lt. Galtsev
- Stepan Krylov as Cpl. Katasonov
- Valentina Malyavina as Masha
- Nikolai Grinko as Lt. Col. Gryaznov
- Dmitri Milyutenko as Old Man
- Irma Raush as Ivan's mother
- Andrei Konchalovsky as Soldier

== Production ==
Ivan's Childhood was Tarkovsky's first feature film, shot two years after his diploma film The Steamroller and the Violin. The film is based on the 1957 short story "Ivan" (Russian: Иван) by Vladimir Bogomolov, which was translated into more than twenty languages. It drew the attention of the screenwriter Mikhail Papava, who changed the story line and made Ivan more of a hero. Papava called his screenplay Second Life (Russian: Вторая жизнь, Vtoraya zhizn). In this screenplay Ivan is not executed, but sent to the Majdanek concentration camp, from where he is freed by the advancing Soviet army. The final scene of this screenplay shows Ivan meeting one of the officers of the army unit in a train compartment. Bogomolov, unsatisfied with this ending, intervened and the screenplay was changed to reflect the source material.

Mosfilm gave the screenplay to the young film director Eduard Abalov. Shooting was aborted and the film project was terminated in December 1960, since the first version of the film drew heavy criticism from the arts council, and the quality was deemed unsatisfactory and unusable. In June 1961 the film project was given to Tarkovsky, who had applied for it after being told about Ivan's Childhood by cinematographer Vadim Yusov. Work on the film resumed in the same month. The film was shot for the most part near Kanev at the Dnieper River.

Tarkovsky continued his collaboration with cinematographer Vadim Yusov, who was the cameraman in Tarkovsky's diploma film The Steamroller and the Violin. Nikolai Burlyayev had played a role in Andrei Konchalovsky's student film The Boy and the Pigeon. Konchalovsky was a friend and fellow student of Tarkovsky at the State Institute of Cinematography (VGIK), and thus Burlyayev was also cast for the role of Ivan. He had to pass several screen tests, but according to Burlyayev it is unclear whether anyone else auditioned for the role. Burlyayev would later play Boriska in Tarkovsky's second feature, Andrei Rublev.

=== Style ===
Nature takes up an important role in Ivan's Childhood. Before the film’s release, the Stalinist viewpoint on war cinema in the 1930s and 40s was that of instrumentalizing nature as a means to serve human agency in context of violence. Ivan's Childhood is produced during the stagnating period of Khrushchev thaw, and as a result instead is considered pioneer in its use of extensive and predominant representation of nature. In the film, nature is omnipresent and is captured both in Ivan’s dreams and in scenes of violence, it’s portrayed as an active witness of human violence, but also as a rebellious force itself entangled in battle, namely as a victim of war. Furthermore, Tarkovsky’s framing of nature in tracking shots was also intended as visual poetry adding a layer of artistic elegance to the film. The way in which he balances poetic representations of nature and violent narratives of war unveils his pursuit of an aesthetic representation of war, and thus also exhibiting his distinguishing cinematographic signature.

== Reception ==
Ivan in a destroyed village. Broken timber beams look like they are cutting into the picture and toward the main character.

=== Box office ===
Ivan's Childhood was one of Tarkovsky's most commercially successful films, selling 16.7 million tickets in the Soviet Union. Tarkovsky himself was displeased with some aspects of the film; in his book Sculpting in Time, he writes at length about subtle changes to certain scenes that he regrets not implementing.

=== Critical response ===
The film received international acclaim on its release. Ivan's Childhood has an approval rating of 100% on review aggregator website Rotten Tomatoes, based on 25 reviews, and an average rating of 9.1/10. The website's critical consensus states, "Ostensibly an atypical Tarkovsky work (less than 100 minutes!), Ivan's Childhood carries the poetry and passion that would characterize the director from here on". It attracted the attention of many intellectuals, including Ingmar Bergman who said, "My discovery of Tarkovsky's first film was like a miracle. Suddenly, I found myself standing at the door of a room the keys of which had, until then, never been given to me. It was a room I had always wanted to enter and where he was moving freely and fully at ease."

Jean-Paul Sartre wrote an article on the film, defending it against a highly critical article in the Italian newspaper L'Unità written by Alberto Moravia and saying that it was one of the most beautiful films he had ever seen. In a later interview, Tarkovsky (who did not consider the film to be among his best work) admitted to agreeing with Moravia's criticisms at the time, finding Sartre's defense "too philosophical and speculative". Filmmakers Sergei Parajanov and Krzysztof Kieślowski praised the film and cited it as an influence on their work.

=== Awards and nominations ===
Ivan's Childhood received numerous awards, including the Golden Lion at the Venice Film Festival and the Golden Gate Award at the San Francisco International Film Festival in 1962. The film was also selected as the Soviet entry for the Best Foreign Language Film at the 36th Academy Awards, but was not accepted as a nominee.

== Film restoration ==
In 2016 the film was digitally restored. The newest version was highly praised by The Independent who called it "The most lyrical war movie ever made pristinely restored".

== See also ==
- List of submissions to the 36th Academy Awards for Best Foreign Language Film
- List of Soviet submissions for the Academy Award for Best Foreign Language Film
