= Irma Raush =

Russian actress (born 1938)

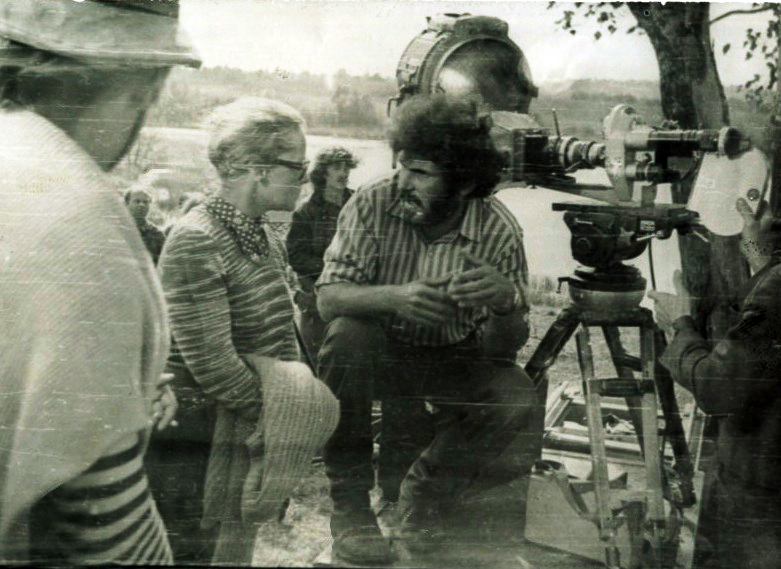
- Born: Irma Yakovlevna Raush; 21 April 1938 (age 88); Saratov, Soviet Union
- Other name: Irina Tarkovskaya
- Spouse: Andrei Tarkovsky (m. 1957; div. 1970)

Irma Yakovlevna Raush (Russian: Ирма Яковлевна Рауш; born 21 April 1938), also known as Irina Tarkovskaya, is a Russian actress. She is best known for her role as Durochka in Andrei Rublev and as Ivan's mother in Ivan's Childhood.

== Biography ==
Irma Raush was born in Saratov on 21 April 1938 into a Volga German family. In 1954, she began to study at the State Institute of Cinematography (VGIK) under Mikhail Romm. She was one of two women in a class of fifteen aspiring film directors. Andrei Tarkovsky was in the same class and she became his supporter, marrying him in April 1957. On 30 September 1962, their son Arseny Tarkovsky was born. They divorced in June 1970. Tarkovsky remarried.

Irma Raush played several roles in Tarkovsky's early films. She played Ivan's mother in Ivan's Childhood in 1962, and Durochka in Andrei Rublev. For the latter role she was awarded the Étoile de Cristal in 1970 for best foreign actress. The Étoile de Cristal was a French film award and predecessor to the César Award. In 1970, she became a film director for the Gorky Film Studio. After finishing her film career, she began to write children's books.

== Filmography ==
As actress

- 1962 - Ivan's Childhood (Ivan's mother)
- 1966 - Andrei Rublev (Durochka)
- 1967 - Doktor Vera

As director

- 1969 - Zhenya
- 1974 - Let Him Stay With Us
- 1975 - Peasant Son
- 1981 - A Tale Told at Night
- 1982 - The Adventures of Dunno
- 1986 - Steppe Squadron

== Personal life ==
Raush was the first wife of film director Andrei Tarkovsky.
