= The Sacrifice (1986 film) =

1986 film by Andrei Tarkovsky

- British re-issue film poster
- Swedish: Offret
- Directed by: Andrei Tarkovsky
- Written by: Andrei Tarkovsky
- Produced by: Anna-Lena Wibom
- Starring: Erland Josephson; Susan Fleetwood; Allan Edwall; Guðrún S. Gísladóttir; Sven Wollter; Valérie Mairesse; Filippa Franzen; Tommy Kjellqvist
- Cinematography: Sven Nykvist
- Edited by: Andrei Tarkovsky; Michal Leszczylowski
- Music by: Johann Sebastian Bach; Watazumido-Shuso
- Distributed by: Sandrew
- Release dates: 9 May 1986 (Sweden); 14 May 1986 (France); 9 January 1987 (London)
- Running time: 142 minutes
- Countries: Sweden; United Kingdom; France
- Languages: Swedish; English; French
- Box office: $300,653 (USA)

The Sacrifice (Swedish: Offret) is a 1986 drama film written and directed by Andrei Tarkovsky. Starring Erland Josephson, the film was produced by the Swedish Film Institute. Many of the crew were alumni of Ingmar Bergman's films, including cinematographer Sven Nykvist. The Sacrifice centers on a middle-aged intellectual who attempts to bargain with God to stop an impending nuclear holocaust. The film combines pagan and Christian religious themes; Tarkovsky called it a "parable".

The Sacrifice was Tarkovsky's third film as a Soviet expatriate, after Nostalghia and the documentary Voyage in Time, and he died shortly after its completion. He was diagnosed with cancer after filming concluded, and by 1986, was unable to attend its presentation at the Cannes Film Festival due to his illness. Like Tarkovsky's Solaris (1972), The Sacrifice won the Grand Prix at Cannes.

== Plot ==
Alexander is an actor who gave up the stage to work as a journalist, critic and lecturer on aesthetics. He lives in a beautiful house with his actress wife Adelaide, stepdaughter Marta, and young son, "Little Man", who is temporarily mute due to a throat operation. Alexander and Little Man plant a tree by the seaside, when Alexander's friend Otto, a part-time postman, delivers a birthday card to him. When Otto asks, Alexander says his relationship with God is "nonexistent". After Otto leaves, Adelaide and Victor, a medical doctor and a close family friend who performed Little Man's operation, arrive and offer to take Alexander and Little Man home in Victor's car, but Alexander prefers to stay behind and talk to his son. In his monologue, he first recounts how he and Adelaide found their house near the sea by accident, and how they fell in love with it and its surroundings, but then enters a bitter tirade against the state of modern man. Little Man hides from Alexander and jumps on his back as a surprise, but Alexander accidentally bats him away, giving Little Man a nosebleed. As Tarkovsky wrote, Alexander is weary of "the pressures of change, the discord in his family, and his instinctive sense of the threat posed by the relentless march of technology"; in fact, he has "grown to hate the emptiness of human speech".

The family, Victor, and Otto gather at Alexander's house for the celebration. Their maid Maria leaves, while nurse-maid Julia stays to help with the dinner. People comment on Maria's odd behavior. The guests chat inside the house, where Otto reveals that he is a student of paranormal phenomena, a collector of "inexplicable but true incidents." Just when dinner is almost ready, the rumbling noise of low-flying jet fighters interrupts them, and soon after, as Alexander enters, a news programme announces the beginning of what appears to be World War III, and possibly nuclear holocaust. His wife has a complete nervous breakdown and is comforted and sedated by Victor. In despair, Alexander vows to God to renounce all he loves, even Little Man, if this may be undone. Otto advises him to slip away and lie with Maria, who Otto tells him is a witch "in the best possible sense".

Alexander takes a pistol from Victor's medical bag, leaves a note in his room, escapes the house, and rides Otto's bike to Maria's house. He tells her the story of when he fixed up and brought order to his mother's garden, only to find that it lost all its beauty when he did so. She is bewildered when he makes his advances, but when he puts the gun to his temple ("Don't kill us, Maria"), at which point the jet fighters' rumblings return, she soothes him and they have sex while floating above her bed, though Alexander's reaction is ambiguous.

When he wakes the next morning, in his own bed, everything seems normal. Nevertheless, Alexander sets forth to give up all he loves and possesses. He tricks the family members and friends into going for a walk, and sets fire to their house while they are away. As the group rushes back, alarmed by the fire, Alexander confesses that he set it, and runs around wildly. Maria, who until then was not seen that morning, appears; Alexander tries to approach her, but is restrained by others. Without explanation, an ambulance appears, and two paramedics chase Alexander, who appears to have lost control of himself, and drive off with him. Maria begins to bicycle away, but stops to observe Little Man watering the tree he and Alexander planted the day before. (Note: 'In the opening shot, before Otto meets them, Alexander tells Little Man the legend of Ioann Kolov, pupil of an Orthodox monk named Pamve, who was ordered by his master to climb a mountain every day, to water a dead tree he had planted, until the tree came back to life, which, after three years, it did.) As Maria leaves, the "mute" Little Man, lying at the foot of the tree, speaks his only line, which quotes the opening of the Gospel of John: "In the beginning was the Word. Why is that, Papa?"

== Cast ==
- Erland Josephson as Alexander
- Susan Fleetwood as Adelaide
- Allan Edwall as Otto
- Guðrún Gísladóttir as Maria
- Sven Wollter as Victor
- Valérie Mairesse as Julia
- Filippa Franzén as Marta
- Tommy Kjellqvist as Gossen (Little Man)
- Per Källman, Tommy Nordahl as ambulance drivers

With additional voices and dubbing to Swedish by

- Tintin Anderzon
- Helena Brodin
- Birgit Carlstén
- Jane Friedmann
- Martin Lindström
- Jan-Olof Strandberg

== Production ==
=== Pre-production ===
The Sacrifice originated as a screenplay called The Witch, which preserved the element of a middle-aged protagonist spending the night with a reputed witch. But in this story, his cancer was miraculously cured, and he ran away with the woman. (Note: It is also worth noting that an idea that appears in Tarkovsky's diaries as early as 1970, which he titled Two Saw the Fox, possibly contains elements of what became The Witch, and by extension, The Sacrifice. An entry from April 1980, during a trip to Italy concerning negotiations for Nostalghia, poses an idea for an ending in which a character commits suicide after a world leader makes a televised speech on the outbreak of war, which turns out to merely be a scene from a movie.) In March 1982, Tarkovsky wrote in his journal that he considered this ending "weak", as the happy ending was unchallenged. He wanted personal favorite and frequent collaborator Anatoly Solonitsyn to star in this picture, as was also his intention for Nostalghia, but when Solonitsyn died from cancer in 1982, the director rewrote the screenplay into what became The Sacrifice and also filmed Nostalghia with Oleg Yankovsky as the lead.

Tarkovsky considered The Sacrifice different from his earlier films because, while his recent films had been "impressionistic in structure", in this case he not only "aimed...to develop [its] episodes in the light of my own experience and of the rules of dramatic structure", but also to "[build] the picture into a poetic whole in which all the episodes were harmoniously linked", and because of this, it "took on the form of a poetic parable". (Note: He also drew a comparison between the Nostalghia character Domenico, who Josephson played, and Alexander, because both "carry the mark of sacrifice" and make offerings of themselves, although Domenico's act (self-immolation in the Piazza del Campidoglio) "produces no tangible results".)

At the 1984 Cannes Film Festival, Tarkovsky was invited to film in Sweden, as he was a longtime friend of Anna-Lena Wibom of the Swedish Film Institute. He decided to film The Sacrifice with Erland Josephson, who was best known for his work with Ingmar Bergman, (Note: Josephson, who met Bergman in 1939, began working with him in the mid-1940s at the Helsingborg City Theatre. Although he would not have a major part in a Bergman film until 1968's Hour of the Wolf, he would become the most frequent male actor in the director's films from that point forward; Max von Sydow's final Bergman collaboration was 1971's The Touch, and Gunnar Björnstrand only had a few appearances after Shame before his death in 1986.) and whom Tarkovsky had directed in Nostalghia. (Note: Though Natalya Bondarchuk was eventually cast in the role, recurring Bergman actor Bibi Andersson, who met Tarkovsky in June 1970, was at one point considered for Hari in Solaris, and around that time, Tarkovsky thought of casting her as the mother in what became The Mirror.) Cinematographer Sven Nykvist, a friend of Josephson and frequent collaborator with Bergman, (Note: Nykvist served as cinematographer for all of Bergman's films from The Virgin Spring through Fanny and Alexander, as well as 1953's Sawdust and Tinsel.) was asked to join the production. Despite a contemporaneous offer to shoot Sydney Pollack's Out of Africa, Nykvist later said it was "not a difficult choice", and like Josephson, he became a co-producer when he invested his fees back into the film. Production designer Anna Asp, who worked on Bergman's Autumn Sonata and After the Rehearsal and had won an Academy Award for Fanny and Alexander, also joined the project, as well as Daniel Bergman, one of Ingmar's children, who worked as a camera assistant. (Note: Daniel later became a director in his own right, of films like Sunday's Children.) Many critics commented on The Sacrifice in the context of Bergman's work. (Note: In a June 1986 interview, Tarkovsky denied a Bergman influence, saying that "for [him], God is not a mute". He questioned how well critics who made the connection understood Bergman and existentialism, adding, "Bergman is closer to Kierkegaard than to problems of religion".)

=== Filming ===
While often erroneously claimed to have been shot on Fårö, (Note: Fårö was Bergman's home for much of his life, and several of his films were shot there.) The Sacrifice was actually filmed at Närsholmen on the nearby island of Gotland; the Swedish military denied Tarkovsky access to Fårö.

Alexander's house, built for the production, was to be burned for the climactic scene, in which Alexander burns it and his possessions. The shot was very difficult to achieve, and the first failed attempt was, according to Tarkovsky, the only problem during shooting. Despite Nykvist's protest, only one camera was used, and while shooting the burning house, the camera jammed and the footage was thus ruined. (Note: This disaster is recorded in the documentary Directed by Andrei Tarkovsky, by Sacrifice co-editor Michał Leszczyłowski, and in One Day in the Life of Andrei Arsenevich, a 1999 French television documentary by Chris Marker.)

The scene had to be reshot, requiring a very costly reconstruction of the house in two weeks. This time, two cameras were set up on tracks, running parallel to each other. The footage in the final version of the film is the second take, which lasts six minutes (and ends abruptly because the camera had run through an entire reel). The cast and crew broke down in tears after the take was completed.

=== Music ===
The film opens and closes with the aria "Erbarme dich, mein Gott" ("Have mercy, my God") from Johann Sebastian Bach's St Matthew Passion. The soundtrack also features shakuhachi recordings by Watazumi Doso.

=== Post-production ===
Tarkovsky and Nykvist performed significant amounts of color reduction on select scenes. According to Nykvist, almost 60% of the color was removed from them. (Note: Nykvist recalled that his work on color reduction prompted a conversation with Akira Kurosawa in the 1990s.)

== Release ==
The film opened at the Lumiere in London on 9 January 1987 and grossed £16,020 in its opening weekend.

== Reception ==
=== Critical response ===
Since its release, reviewers have responded positively to the film; the review aggregator Rotten Tomatoes reports an approval rating of 88%, based on 43 reviews with an average rating of 8.4/10. The website's critical consensus states, "Formally impressive, visually accomplished, and narratively rewarding, The Sacrifice places a fittingly solid capstone on a brilliant filmmaking career". Metacritic, which uses a weighted average, assigned the film a score of 85 out of 100, based on 21 critics, indicating "universal acclaim".

In 1995, the Vatican compiled a list of 45 "great films", separated into the categories of Religion, Values, and Art, to recognize the centennial of cinema. The Sacrifice was included in the first category, as was Tarkovsky's Andrei Rublev.

Critics have commented on The Sacrifice's religious ambiguities. Dennis Lim wrote that it is "not exactly a simple allegory of Christian atonement and self-sacrifice". Catholic film critic Steven Greydanus contrasts the film's "dialectic of Christian and pagan ideas" with Andrei Rublev, writing that, while Rublev "[rejects] the advances of an alluring pagan witch as incompatible with Christian love", The Sacrifice "juxtaposes" both sensibilities. Andrew Petiprin highlights the difficulty of faith in his review.

=== Awards and nominations ===
The film won Tarkovsky his second Grand Prix, after Solaris, his third FIPRESCI Prize at the 1986 Cannes Film Festival, and his third Palme D'Or nomination. (Note: Solaris won the Grand Prix, Andrei Rublev and Nostalghia received FIPRESCI Prizes, and Solaris and Nostalghia had received Palme D'Or nominations.) (Note: In his diaries, Tarkovsky, who did not attend the festival due to his health, commented on how the film that won the latter award, The Mission, had apparently been unfinished, and yet had won the festival's top honor. Nevertheless, he wrote that "those who want to give their attention to my films are the greatest prize".) The Sacrifice also won the Prize of the Ecumenical Jury. (Note: As his previous films, Stalker and Nostalghia, had received the prize in their respective years of competition, Tarkovsky is the only director to have won it three times.) At the 22nd Guldbagge Awards, the film won the awards for Best Film and Best Actor (Erland Josephson). In 1988, it won the BAFTA Award for Best Foreign Language Film. The film was selected as the Swedish entry for the Best Foreign Language Film at the 59th Academy Awards, but was not accepted as a nominee.

== See also ==
- List of submissions to the 59th Academy Awards for Best Foreign Language Film
- List of Swedish submissions for the Academy Award for Best Foreign Language Film
