= Arseny Tarkovsky =

Soviet Russian poet and translator (1907–1989)

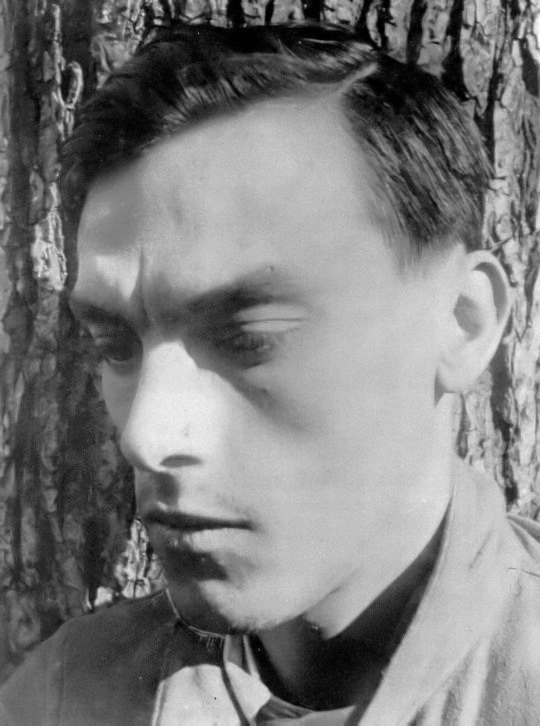
- Arseny Tarkovsky in the mid-1930s
- Born: 25 June 1907 (N.S.); Yelisavetgrad, Russian Empire
- Died: 27 May 1989 (aged 81); Moscow, Soviet Union
- Children: Andrei Tarkovsky
- Writing career
- Notable awards: USSR State Prize (1989)
- Movement: Neo-Acmeism

Arseny Aleksandrovich Tarkovsky (Russian: Арсений Александрович Тарковский; 25 June [O.S. 12 June] 1907 – 27 May 1989) was a Soviet and Russian poet and translator. He was predeceased by his son, film director and screenwriter Andrei Tarkovsky.

== Biography ==
=== Family ===
Tarkovsky was born on 25 June N.S. 1907 in Yelisavetgrad, Kherson Governorate, Ukrainian region of the Russian Empire. His father was Aleksander Tarkovsky, a Ukrainian-born bank clerk of Polish heritage, and his mother was Maria Danilovna Rachkovskaya of Romanian heritage Aleksander Tarkovsky was arrested in connection with an assassination attempt on the Governor-General of Kharkov; he was taken into custody while still a student.

=== Youth ===
Arseny attended the Elisavetgrad gymnasium and studied at the music school of Gustav Neuhaus, the father of the famous musician Heinrich Neuhaus. Even as a child, together with his father and brother, he attended poetry evenings of visiting celebrities: Igor Severyanin, Konstantin Balmont, Fedor Sologub[4]. Arseny's older brother, Valery Tarkovsky, was an anarchist who died at age fifteen in 1919 while defending their Ukrainian hometown of Yelizavetgrad from the forces of Nykyfor Hryhoriv.

In 1921, Tarkovsky and his friends published a poem which contained an acrostic about Lenin. They were arrested, and sent to Nikolayev for execution. Tarkovsky was the only one that managed to escape.

=== Career ===
By 1924 Tarkovsky moved to Moscow, and from 1924 to 1925 he worked for a newspaper for railroad workers called Gudok, where he managed an editorial section written in verse. In 1925–1929 he studied literature at a university college in Moscow. At that time he translated poetry from Azerbaijanian, Georgian, Armenian and Arabic.

During World War II he volunteered as a war-correspondent at the army newspaper Boevaya Trevoga (War Alarm). He was wounded in action in 1943. The leg wound he received caused gas gangrene, and Tarkovsky had to undergo six gradual amputations.

Arseny Tarkovsky was mainly known as a translator of Abu'l-Ala-Al-Ma'arri, Nizami, Magtymguly, Kemine, Sayat-Nova, Vazha-Pshavela, Adam Mickiewicz, Mollanepes, Grigol Orbeliani and many other poets. His first collection of poetry, Before snow, was published in 1962. His poetry was inspired by the Cossack poet Hryhorii Skovoroda, particularly in the use of landscapes and nature.

== Death ==
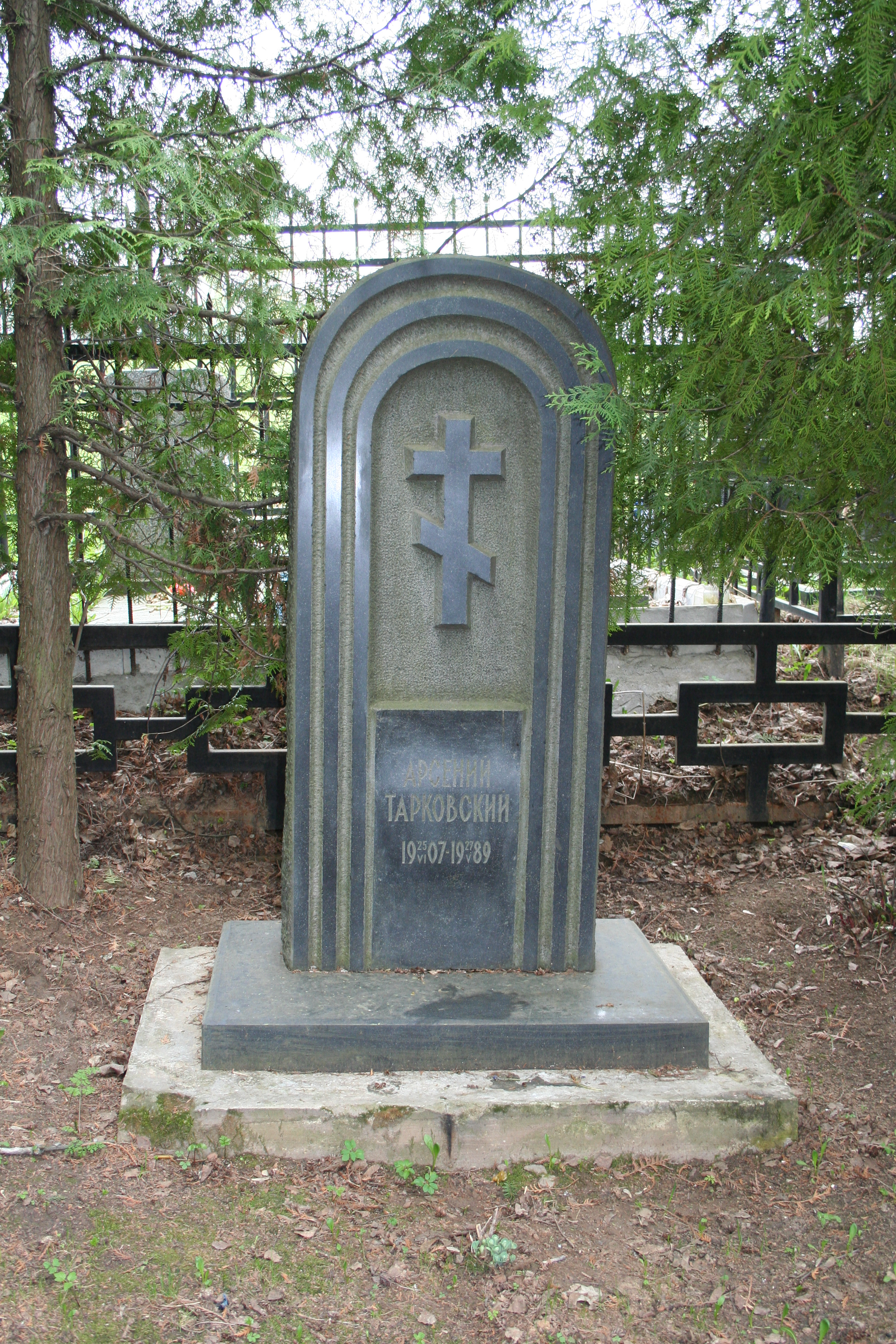
Tarkovsky's grave in the Peredelkino cemetery

He lived mostly in Moscow and Peredelkino and died on 27 May 1989, in Moscow. In 1989 he was posthumously awarded the USSR State Prize.

== Books ==
- Перед снегом – Before snow (1962);
- Земле земное – To Earth Its Own (1966);
- Вестник – Messenger (1969);
- Стихотворения – Poems (1974);
- Зимний день – Winter Day (1980);
- Избранное – Selected works (1982);
- Стихи разных лет – Poems of different years (1983) – compilation of early verse;
- От юности до старости – From Youth to Old Age (1987);
- Благословенный свет – The Blessed Light (1993).
