= The Sight & Sound Greatest Films of All Time 2012 =

Critics' and directors' lists of greatest films per British Film Institute's opinion poll

The Sight & Sound Greatest Films of All Time 2012 was a worldwide opinion poll conducted by Sight & Sound and published in the magazine's September 2012 issue. Sight & Sound, published by the British Film Institute, has conducted a poll of the greatest films every 10 years since 1952.

== Criteria ==
For this poll, Sight & Sound listened to decades of criticism about the lack of diversity of its poll participants and made a huge effort to invite a much wider variety of critics and filmmakers from around the world to participate, taking into account gender, ethnicity, race, geographical region, socioeconomic status, and other kinds of underrepresentation.

A new rule was imposed for this ballot: related films that are considered part of a larger whole (e.g. The Godfather and The Godfather Part II, Krzysztof Kieślowski's Three Colors trilogy and Dekalog, or Satyajit Ray's The Apu Trilogy) were to be treated as separate films for voting purposes.

== Critics' poll ==
They published the critics' list of "greatest films" based on 846 critics, programmers, academics, and distributors, as well as a directors' list based on 358 directors and filmmakers. The two lists were headed by 1958's Vertigo and 1953's Tokyo Story respectively.

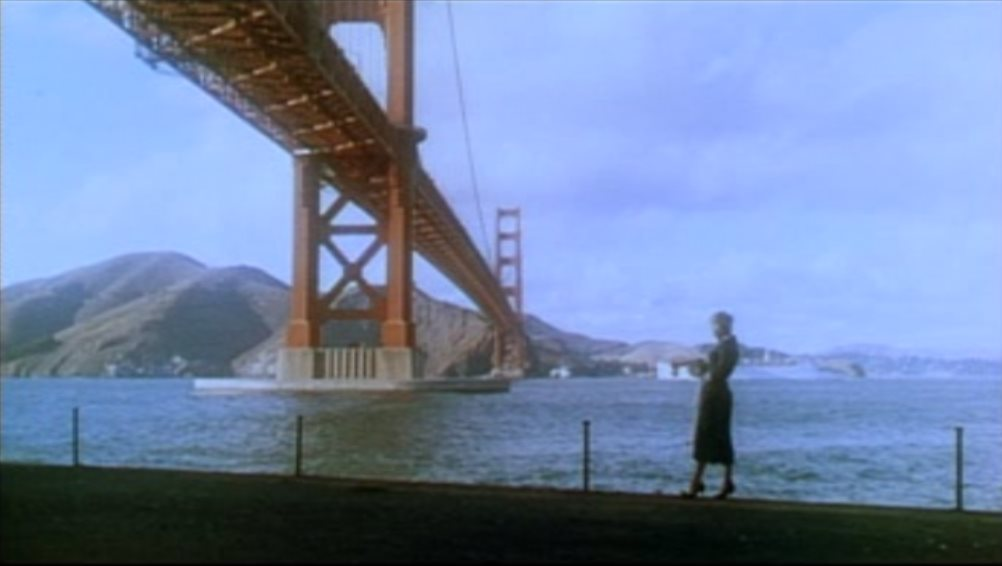
Vertigo (1958)

In the 2012 critics' poll, Vertigo ranked first, replacing Citizen Kane, which held the top spot in the previous five decennial critics' polls.

Dziga Vertov's 1929 silent documentary Man with a Movie Camera was the only film in the top 10 that had not appeared in the critics' top 10 lists published previously.

2,045 different films received at least one mention from one of the 846 critics.

1. Vertigo (191 mentions)
2. Citizen Kane (157 mentions)
3. Tokyo Story (107 mentions)
4. The Rules of the Game (100 mentions)
5. Sunrise: A Song of Two Humans (93 mentions)
6. 2001: A Space Odyssey (90 mentions)
7. The Searchers (78 mentions)
8. Man with a Movie Camera (68 mentions)
9. The Passion of Joan of Arc (65 mentions)
10. 8½ (64 mentions)

Closest runner-up: Battleship Potemkin. (63 mentions)

== Directors' poll ==
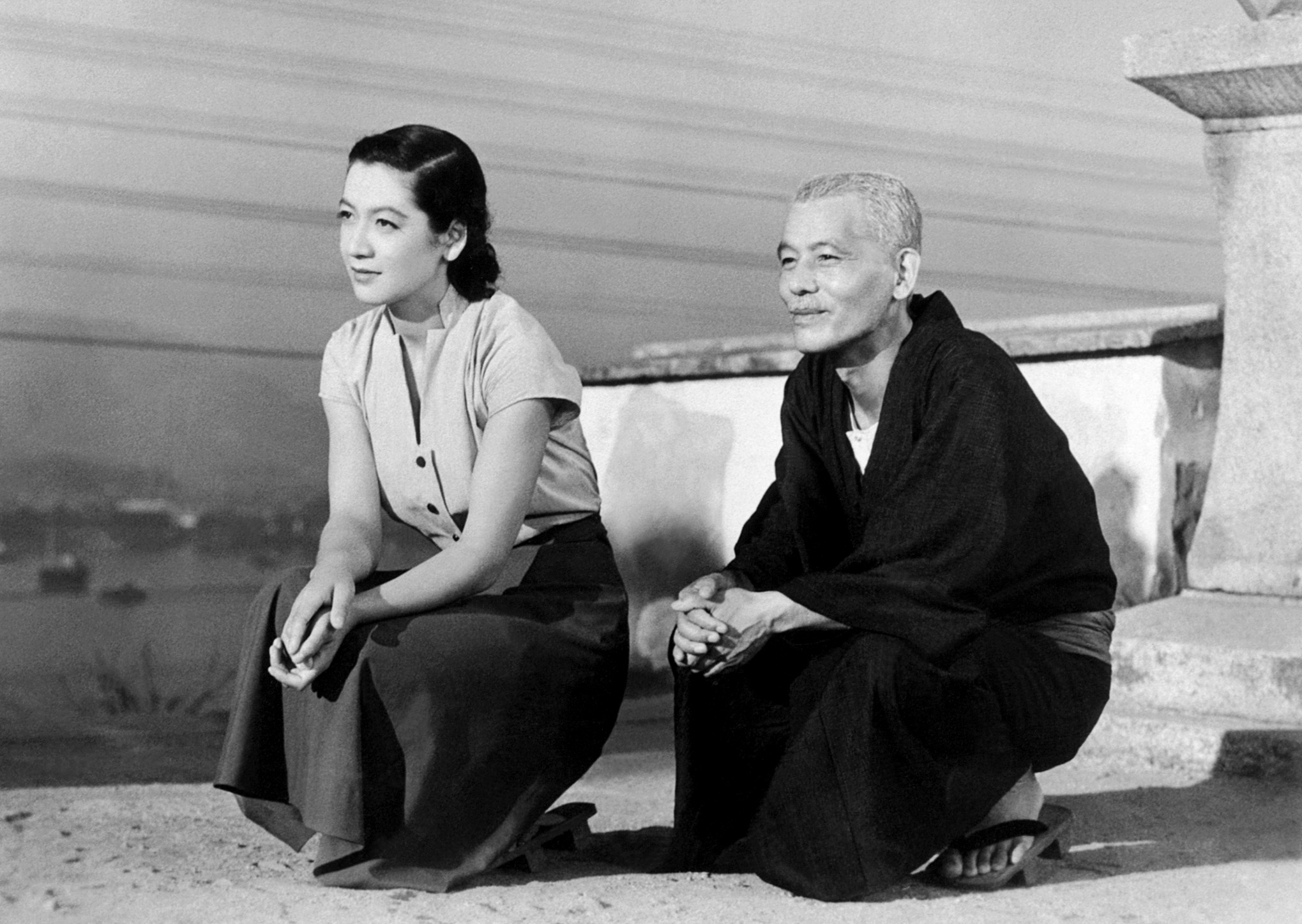
Tokyo Story (1953)

In the 2012 directors' poll, Tokyo Story ranked first, also replacing Citizen Kane, which held the top spot in both of the previous decennial directors' polls.

Among the directors that participated were Quentin Tarantino, Martin Scorsese, Ken Loach and Francis Ford Coppola.

1. Tokyo Story (48 mentions)
2. 2001: A Space Odyssey (42 mentions)
2. Citizen Kane (42 mentions)
4. 8½ (40 mentions)
5. Taxi Driver (34 mentions)
6. Apocalypse Now (33 mentions)
7. The Godfather (31 mentions)
7. Vertigo (31 mentions)
9. Mirror (30 mentions)
10. Bicycle Thieves (29 mentions)

== See also ==
- The Sight and Sound Greatest Films of All Time 2022
