= Sculpting in Time =

1985 book by Andrei Tarkovsky

- First edition (German)
- Author: Andrei Tarkovsky
- Original title: Die Versiegelte Zeit
- Translator: Kitty Hunter-Blair
- Genre: Film theory
- Publisher: University of Texas Press
- Publication date: 1985
- ISBN: 0-292-77624-1
- OCLC: 31736519

Sculpting in Time (Russian: Запечатлённое время, lit. 'Captured Time') is a film theory book by Russian filmmaker Andrei Tarkovsky about art and cinema in general, particularly his own films. It was originally published in German in 1985, then Italian in 1986, and English in 1987. The title refers to the name he gave his own style of filmmaking.

== Synopsis ==
The book's main statement about the nature of cinema is summarized in its claim that "the dominant, all-powerful factor of the film image is rhythm, expressing the course of time within the frame". It contains a great deal of poetry written by Tarkovsky's father Arseny and some of Tarkovsky's personal writings on his own life and work, as well as lectures and discussions Tarkovsky had with film history student Olga Surkova during the making of his film Andrei Rublev. Surkova later became a professional critic and assisted Tarkovsky with writing Sculpting in Time, for which he cited her as an inspiration. The book has commentary on each of Tarkovsky's seven major feature films and his complex relationship with the Soviet Union. The final chapter, a discussion of his film The Sacrifice, was written during the last weeks of his life.

== Background ==
Tarkovsky wrote Sculpting in Time partially to explain and give insight on the nature of his films, which often puzzled audiences. In the book's introduction, he cites many letters he received throughout his career, both of praise and discouragement; the letters, whether positive or negative, all seemed to agree that viewers did not understand what was happening in his films. The book, as Tarkovsky explained, was a response to the questions of an audience willing to open a dialogue with him.

== Reception ==
Critical reception for Sculpting in Time was positive, with the Slavic Review praising its translation, content, and layout. Eric David called it "one of the greatest books on filmmaking written by a director". Writing for The Sunday Times, film scholar Ian Christie acknowledged that the book accomplished Tarkovsky's goals of giving insight into his creative process and explaining the logic behind his films.
