= Arthouse science fiction film =

Genre of film

Arthouse science fiction (or arthouse sci-fi) is a combination of art and science fiction cinema.

== List of notable arthouse sci-fi films ==
- Aelita, (Yakov Protazanov, 1924)
- Metropolis, (Fritz Lang, 1927)
- Woman in the Moon, (Fritz Lang, 1929)
- Krakatit (Otakar Vavra, 1948)
- La Jetee (Chris Marker, 1962)
- Alphaville (Jean-Luc Godard, 1965)
- Sins of the Fleshapoids (Mike Kuchar, 1965)
- The 10th Victim (Elio Petri, 1965)
- Fahrenheit 451 (François Truffaut, 1966)
- Seconds (John Frankenheimer, 1966)
- 2001: A Space Odyssey (Stanley Kubrick, 1968)
- A Clockwork Orange (Stanley Kubrick, 1971)
- THX-1138 (George Lucas, 1971)
- Solaris (Andrei Tarkovsky, 1972)
- Fantastic Planet (René Laloux, 1973)
- O Lucky Man! (Lindsay Anderson, 1973)
- World on a Wire (Rainer Werner Fassbinder, 1973)
- A Boy and His Dog (L.Q. Jones, 1975)
- The Man Who Fell to Earth (Nicholas Roeg, 1976)
- Stalker (Andrei Tarkovsky, 1979)
- Dead Mountaineer's Hotel (Grigori Kromanov, 1979)
- Altered States (Ken Russell, 1980)
- Blade Runner (Ridley Scott, 1982)
- Liquid Sky (Slava Tsukerman, 1982)
- Born in Flames (Lizzie Borden, 1983)
- Videodrome (David Cronenberg, 1983)
- Decoder (Muscha, 1984)
- Repo Man (Alex Cox, 1984)
- Angel's Egg (Mamoru Oshii, 1985)
- Brazil (Terry Gilliam, 1985)
- Dead Man's Letters (Konstantin Lopushansky, 1986)
- Mauvais Sang (Leos Carax, 1986)
- Morning Patrol (Nikos Nikolaidis, 1987)
- Days of Eclipse (Alexander Sokurov, 1988)
- On the Silver Globe (Andrzej Żuławski, 1988)
- Tetsuo: The Iron Man (Shinya Tsukamoto, 1989)
- A Visitor to a Museum (Konstantin Lopushansky, 1989)
- Naked Lunch (David Cronenberg, 1991)
- The City of Lost Children (Jean-Pierre Jeunet, 1995)
- Gattaca (Andrew Niccol, 1997)
- Pi (Darren Aronofsky, 1998)
- New Rose Hotel (Abel Ferrara, 1998)
- Dark City (Alex Proyas, 1998)
- eXistenz (David Cronenberg, 1999)
- Donnie Darko (Richard Kelly, 2001)
- Solaris (Steven Soderbergh, 2002)
- Code 46 (Michael Winterbottom, 2003)
- 2046 (Wong Kar-wai, 2004)
- Primer (Shane Carruth, 2004)
- Dust (Sergey Loban, 2005)
- The Wild Blue Yonder (Werner Herzog, 2005)
- The Fountain (Darren Aranofsky, 2006)
- A Scanner Darkly (Richard Linklater, 2006)
- The Ugly Swans (Konstantin Lopushansky, 2006)
- Mr. Nobody (Jaco Van Dormael, 2009)
- Moon (Duncan Jones, 2009)
- Beyond the Black Rainbow (Panos Cosmatos, 2010)
- Melancholia (Lars von Trier, 2011)
- Cloud Atlas (The Wachowskis and Tom Tykwer, 2012)
- Coherence (James Ward Byrkit, 2013)
- Hard to Be a God (Aleksei Yuryevich German, 2013)
- Her (Spike Jonze, 2013)
- Upstream Color (Shane Carruth, 2013)
- Under the Skin (Jonathan Glazer, 2013)
- The Zero Theorem (Terry Gilliam, 2013)
- Ex Machina (Alex Garland, 2014)
- The Lobster (Yorgos Lanthimos, 2015)
- Under Electric Clouds (Aleksei Alekseivich German, 2015)
- Marjorie Prime (Michael Almereyda, 2017)
- Annihilation (Alex Garland, 2018)
- High Life (Claire Denis, 2018)
- After Blue (Bertrand Mandico, 2021)
- Memorial (Apichatpong Weerasethakul, 2021)
- Neptune Frost (Saul Williams, Anisia Uzeyman, 2021)
- Quarantine (Diana Ringo, 2021)
- Bigbug (Jean-Pierre Jeunet, 2022)
- Crimes of the Future (David Cronenberg, 2022)
- Petrópolis (Valery Fokin, 2022)
- W (Anna Eriksson, 2022)
- Vesper (Kristina Buožytė and Bruno Samper, 2022)
- 1984 (Diana Ringo, 2023)
- Poor Things (Yorgos Lanthimos, 2023)

== Directors associated with sci-fi art film ==
- Darren Aronofsky
- Shane Carruth
- David Cronenberg
- Alex Garland
- Terry Gilliam
- Jonathan Glazer
- Stanley Kubrick
- Fritz Lang
- Yorgos Lanthimos
- Konstantin Lopushansky
- George Lucas
- Alex Proyas
- Diana Ringo
- Ridley Scott
- Andrei Tarkovsky
- Shinya Tsukamoto
- The Wachowskis

== See also ==
- Art horror
- Arthouse animation
- Extreme cinema
- German Expressionism
- Maximalist film
- Minimalist film
- Slow cinema
- Vulgar auteurism
