= List of Russian films of 1994 =

A list of films produced in Russia in 1994 (see 1994 in film).

== 1994 ==
Title	Russian title	Director	Cast	Genre	Notes
Assia and the Hen with the Golden Eggs	Курочка Ряба	Andrei Konchalovsky	Inna Churikova	Comedy	
Burnt by the Sun	Утомлённые солнцем	Nikita Mikhalkov	Oleg Menshikov	Drama	
Jonathan of the Bears	Джонатан — друг медведей	Enzo G. Castellari	Franco Nero	Western	
Katya Ismailova	Подмосковные вечера	Valery Todorovsky	Vladimir Mashkov	Drama	
Life and Extraordinary Adventures of Private Ivan Chonkin	Жизнь и необычайные приключения солдата Ивана Чонкина	Jiří Menzel	Gennady Nazarov	Comedy	
Maestro Thief	Маэстро вор	Vladimir Shamshurin	Vladimir Ferapontov	Action	
Passions	Увлеченья	Kira Muratova	Renata Litvinova	Comedy	
Peshavar Waltz	Пешаварский вальс	Timur Bekmambetov	Barry Kushner	Drama	
Russian Symphony	Русская симфония	Konstantin Lopushansky	Viktor Mikhaylov	Drama	
Tatsu	Тацу	Vera Yakovenko	Margarita Pushkina	Drama	
The Castle	Замок	Aleksei Balabanov	Nikolay Stotsky	Drama	
The Master and Margarita	Мастер и Маргарита	Yuri Kara	Anastasiya Vertinskaya	Fantasy	
The Year of the Dog	Год собаки	Semyon Aranovich	Inna Churikova	Drama	
Three Sisters	Три сестры	Sergei Solovyov	Olga Belyayeva	Drama	
To whom will God send	На кого Бог пошлёт	Vladimir Zaykin	Larisa Udovichenko	Comedy	
Zone of Lyube	Зона Любэ	Dmitry Zolotukhin	Nikolay Rastorguyev	Drama	

== See also ==
- 1994 in Russia
