= Andrey Sigle =

Russian composer

- Born: 15 May 1964 (age 62); Nizhny Novgorod, USSR
- Occupations: Composer, Film producer
- Years active: 1976 – present

Andrey Reinhardtovich Sigle (Russian: Андре́й Рейнга́рдтович Си́гле; born 15 May 1964, Gorky, USSR) is a Russian film producer, film music composer, musician, head of the companies Proline Film and Studio ACDC.

== Biography ==
Andrey Sigle was born on May 17, 1964, in Gorky. Andrey started to study music since he was 5.

Sigle graduated from the Rimsky-Korsakov music college. In 1986 he entered Conservatory in the name of Rimsky-Korsakov, piano class (studio of Mr. Zarukin). He was invited by the head of Royal Swedish Academy of Music to study the profession of a film music composer, which became the unique precedent in Russia.

In the mid 1980s, he became interested in sequencers and other instruments which allow to imitate the sounds of the philharmonic orchestra. Andrey participated in recording of the albums for such music groups like Kino, Alisa, Nautilus Pompilius, and also projects for solo by Sergey Kuryokhin and Boris Grebenshchikov. He worked as an arranger and sound designer for their albums.

He also worked as a composer together with Victor Tsoi and Kino at the creation of Igla (The Needle) (1988), Sobachye serdtse (Heart of a Dog) (1988), took part in the project named Posetitel museya (A Visitor to a Museum) by Konstantin Lopushanskiy, the composer is Alfred Schnittke (1989).

Andrey made his debut as a film music composer after the shooting of Klesh (The Tick) (1990), produced by Alexander Baranov and Bakhit Kalibaev. This project had become a turning point in his career and from that moment Andrey started to compose music for motion pictures only.

Among his works are: Sensation by Boris Gorlov, Koleso lubvi (The Wheel of Love) by Ernest Yasan, Poslednee delo Varenogo (The last affair by Vareniy) by Vitaly Melnikov, Prohindiada-2 by Alexander Kaliagin, Russkaya Simfonia (Russian Symphony) by Konstantin Lopushansky, Chetirnadtsat tsvetov radugi (The Fourteen Colors of Rainbow) by Dmitry Svetozarov.

Siegle became the composer of a popular Russian serial named Ulitsi razbitih fonarey (Streets of Broken Lights). In 1998-2000 he composed for television series Agent natsionalnoy bezopasnosti (National Security Agent), Po imeni Baron (By the Name of Baron).

The new turn was marked with the projects Faust, Telets (Taurus), Otets i syn (Father and Son), Solntse (The Sun) where he worked together with Alexander Sokurov, Russian director. These projects were awarded a lot of prizes at the international festivals.

A.S.D.S. Cinema Production Company was established in 2002 by Andrey Siegle and Russian producer Dmitry Svetozarov. The serial Tantsor (The Dancer), Tri tsveta lubvi (Three colors of Love) were released by this studio. Nastoiashie menti (The true Cops) and Favorsky are successfully completed.

Proline-film Studio was established by Andrey Sigle in 2004. This studio specializes in feature films. The Sun by Alexander Sokurov (in cooperation with Nikola-film) was presented at the 55th Anniversary International Berlin Film Festival, Gadkie lebedi (The Ugly Swans) by Konstantin Lopushansky won “Best Music” award on Sochi Open Russian Film Festival in 2006. Siegle is a film music composer and a producer of this project. He is a co-producer of French-Russian project "Serko" (together with CDP Studio, producer Catherine Dussart) by producer Joel Farges. The opening night is planned to be held in March 2006. Siegle was also awarded a prestigious prize for "Best music" in the Udalyonnyy dostup (The Remote Access), a feature film by Svetlana Proskurina, at Kinotavr cinema festival in Sochi.

In 2014 Andrey Sigle was nominated for Nika Award in “Best Music” competition (film «The Role», 2013).

Andrey Sigle is currently living and working in Saint-Petersburg.

== Filmography ==
=== Producer ===
- 2013 The Role (directed by Konstantin Lopushnsky starring Maksim Sukhanov)
- 2013 Arventur
- 2011 Faust
- 2010 Missing Man
- 2009 Love without rules
- 2009 Intonation
- 2008 The Orchard (loosely based on Anton Chekhov's play "The Cherry Orchard")
- 2008 Dealer (serial)
- 2008 A.D. (serial)
- 2008 Brothers (serial)
- 2007 Guide
- 2007 Crime and Punishment (loosely based on Dostoevsky's novel "Crime and Punishment") (serial)
- 2007 Alexandra
- 2006 The Ugly Swans
- 2006 Serko
- 2005 Favorsky (serial)
- 2004 The Sun
- 2003 Dancer (serial)
- 2003 By the name of Baron (serial)

=== Composer ===
- 2013 Arventur
- 2011 Faust
- 2010 Missing Man
- 2009 Love without rules
- 2010 Missing Man
- 2008 The Orchard
- 2008 Brothers (serial)
- 2008 A.D. (serial)
- 2007 Alexandra
- 2007 Crime and Punishment (serial)
- 2006 The Ugly Swans
- 2005 Favorsky (serial)
- 2004 The Demon (animation)
- 2004 The Sun
- 2004 Remote Access
- 2003 Dancer (serial)
- 2003 Dinara Asanova
- 2003 The Father and The Son
- 2003 By the name of Baron (serial)
- 2002 The Clown (animation)
- 2000 14 Colours of Rainbow
- 2000 National security agent (serial)
- 1999 Delicate thing
- 1998 Streets of Broken Lights (serial)
- 1998 Hard time
- 1996 Love strong as death
- 1995 Mary Pickford the pioneer
- 1994 The Firing Range
- 1994 The Wheel of Love
- 1994 Last Case of Vareny
- 1994 Prokhindiada 2
- 1994 Russian Symphony
- 1993 Sensation
- 1993 The Creation of Adam
- 1993 Cynthia
- 1993 Labirint of Love
- 1992 Waiting Room
- 1991 The Sacrifice for the Emperor
- 1991 The Ring
- 1990 The Tick

=== Musician ===
- 1989 Museum visitor
- 1988 A Dog's Heart
- 1988 The needle
