= Russian Symphony =

- Film poster
- Directed by: Konstantin Lopushansky
- Written by: Konstantin Lopushansky
- Produced by: Aleksandr Golutva
- Starring: Viktor Mikhaylov; Aleksandr Ilyin; Kira Kreylis-Petrova; Valery Garkalin
- Cinematography: Nikolai Pokoptsev
- Music by: Andrey Sigle
- Production companies: Lenfilm; Orient Express
- Release date: 1994
- Running time: 108 min
- Country: Russia
- Language: Russian

Russian Symphony (Russian: Русская симфония, romanized: Russkaya simfoniya) is a 1994 Russian psychological drama film directed by Konstantin Lopushansky and starring Viktor Mikhaylov. The narrative is set in a dark version of contemporary Russia, where the world appears to be coming to an end through a flood. A man is desperate to do something good with his life before it ends, but is mostly met with suspicion.

The film ties in thematically with Lopushansky's other apocalyptic films—Dead Man's Letters (1986), A Visitor to a Museum (1989), and The Ugly Swans (2006)—and is the most overtly religious of them.

It played in the Forum section of the 45th Berlin International Film Festival and received the Prize of the Ecumenical Jury.

== Plot ==
The film is a parable about the Last Judgment, set in contemporary Russia.

The protagonist, a Russian intellectual, sets out on a journey to save orphaned children who are drowning in a boarding school. The action unfolds in a phantasmagorical reality, in which events from the past—such as the re-enactment of ancient Russian battles—are interwoven with the realities of 1990s Russia. The protagonist gathers all the Russian armies from all centuries for the Final Battle, in the name of the triumph of Orthodoxy. Upon arriving at the battlefield, however, he discovers that this very army is the army of the Antichrist.

== Cast ==
- Viktor Mikhaylov as Ivan Sergeyevich Mazayev
- Aleksandr A. Ilyin as Sanya
- Kira Kreylis-Petrova as Valentina Ivanovna Mazdukhina
- Valentina Kovel as Semyonovna
- Mikhail Khrabrov as General
- Valentin Golubenko as Giliuli
- Natalya Akimova as Teacher
- Nora Gryakalova as Teacher
- Aleksey Ingelevich
- Nikolai Levykin as Mikhail Gorbachev
- Valery Garkalin as Borisych
- Andrey Krasko as Cossack
