= A Visitor to a Museum =

1989 film

- Film poster
- Directed by: Konstantin Lopushansky
- Written by: Konstantin Lopushansky
- Starring: Viktor Mikhaylov
- Cinematography: Nikolai Pokoptsev
- Production companies: Kinostudiya "Lenfilm"; Goskino SSSR; CSM Filmproduktion AG; ZDF
- Release dates: July 1989 (Moscow International Film Festival); March 1990 (Soviet Union)
- Running time: 136 minutes
- Countries: Soviet Union; Switzerland; West Germany
- Language: Russian

A Visitor to a Museum (Russian: Посетитель музея, romanized: Posetitel muzeya) is a 1989 Soviet post-apocalyptic drama film directed and written by Konstantin Lopushansky. It was entered into the 16th Moscow International Film Festival, where it won the Silver St. George and the Prix of Ecumenical Jury.

A Visitor to a Museum is the second in a collection of films dubbed the 'Apocalypse Quartet', directed by Lopushansky and set in apocalyptic or post-apocalyptic settings. The other films in the quartet are Dead Man's Letters (1986), Russian Symphony (1994), and The Ugly Swans (2006).

== Plot ==
In a post-apocalyptic world after a global environmental disaster, the remnants of humanity are living out their century, indifferent to the fate of the planet and making no attempt to stop the catastrophe. Among the humans is a caste of 'degenerates'—people who are significantly intellectually disabled.

The main character comes to the sea, which periodically overflows and then dries up. He wants to see the ancient sunken city, which will reappear on the surface when the sea parts again. While waiting for this moment, he talks to the locals. He discovers that the 'ordinary' people—the innkeepers—have lost what remains of their spirituality and are silencing their spiritual hunger with entertainment. They discourage him from going to the ancient city because others who tried before died. They urge him instead to stay with them, listen to music, watch television, feast, and dance. A guest seduces him during a party and they have sex.

At the same time, the degenerates have retained religion and a semblance of spirituality. One of the degenerates—the innkeepers' maid—believes that the Visitor is a saviour sent by God and begs him not to leave, not to abandon his quest. The hero, at her invitation, attends a nightly service of the degenerates, at which the crowd begs God to take them from the post-apocalyptic world to heaven. This leads him to a spiritual epiphany (a psychosis). Ordinary people begin to fear him, believing him to be a mutant in disguise. When the sea finally parts, the degenerates kidnap him, drug him, and send him to the sunken city in ceremomial clothes, where he sobs to God to atone for the sins of mankind.

In the finale, the housewife, who had previously scorned religion and mutants, also experiences an epiphany under the Visitor's influence. The Visitor, on the other hand, finally falls into a religious frenzy and can only thrash and scream for God.

== Cast ==
- Viktor Mikhailov as The Visitor
- Vera Mayorova as Manager
- Vadim Lobanov as Manager
- Irina Rakshina as Degenerate Maid
- Aleksandr Rasinsky
- Iosif Ryklin
- Yuriy Sobolev
- Vladimir Firsov

== Awards ==
- Nomination for International Fantasy Film Award at the Fantasporto 1991 film festival, Porto, Portugal
- Nomination for Golden St. George prize at the 1989 Moscow International Film Festival
- Special Jury Prize winner at the 1989 Moscow International Film Festival
- Ecumenical Jury Award winner at the 1989 Moscow International Film Festival
