= Maksim Sukhanov =

Russian composer

- Максим Суханов
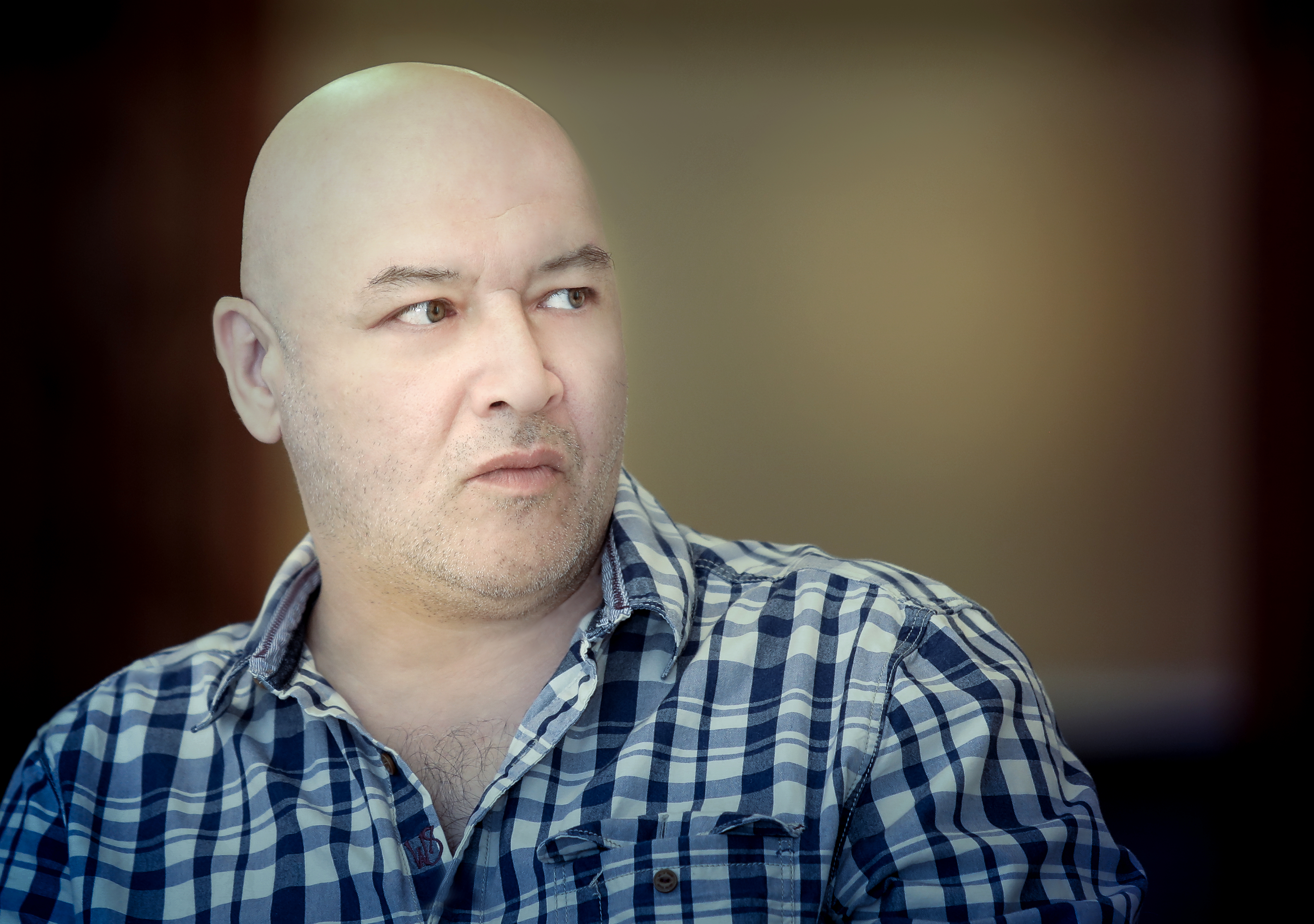
- Maksim Sukhanov at a film presentation.
- Born: Maksim Aleksandrovich Sukhanov; 10 November 1963 (age 63); Moscow, RSFSR, USSR
- Citizenship: Soviet Union; Russian
- Education: Boris Shchukin Theatre Institute
- Occupations: Actor, producer, theater composer, restaurateur
- Years active: 1985
- Employer: Vakhtangov State Academic Theatre
- Awards: Nika Award - 1998, 2009

Maksim Aleksandrovich Sukhanov (Russian: Макси́м Алекса́ндрович Суха́нов; born 10 November 1963) is a Soviet and Russian actor, producer, theatrical composer, and restaurateur. His film credits include The Goddess, The Horde, The Country of Deaf and The Role. He was awarded the State Prize of the Russian Federation in 1996 and 2001. In 2024 he moved to Berlin.

== Early life ==
Maksim Sukhanov was born in Moscow, Russian SFSR, Soviet Union. His mother is Tatyana Sukhanova, stepfather is the poet and journalist Alexander Aronov.

He grew up in a creative family: his grandparents were actors, and his mother was an artist. Until the eighth grade, he studied music under his grandmother and various visiting instructors. He graduated from a school with a focus on literature.

He ended up becoming an actor — by his own admission, quite by accident — because he didn’t want to join the army. In 1985, he graduated from the Boris Shchukin Theatre Institute, from a course taught by T. Kopteva and V. Ivanov.

== Career ==
From 1985 to 2022, he was an actor at the Vakhtangov State Academic Theatre. He has also collaborated with the Lenkom Theatre, the Stanislavski Theatre, and the Mayakovsky Theatre. Among his most notable roles are Amphitryon, Cyrano de Bergerac, and King Lear (at the Vakhtangov Theatre), as well as Petruchio in "The Taming of the Shrew" and Khlestakov in "The Government Inspector" (at the MDT). He is a recipient of the State Prize and the "Golden Seagull" award for his portrayal of Khlestakov.

== Filmography ==
- 1998 Country of the Deaf as Svinya
- 2000 24 Hours as Felix
- 2002 Theatrical Novel as Pyotr Bombardov / Ivan Vasilyevitch
- 2004 The Goddess as professor Mikhail Konstantinovich
- 2006 Moscow Mission as Starshiy (Denis)
- 2008 The Inhabited Island Part 1 as Dad
- 2009 The Inhabited island: Skirmish Part 2 as Dad
- 2010 Burnt by the Sun 2 as Stalin
- 2011 The Horde (film) as Metropolitan Aleksei
- 2013 The Role as Nikolai Yevlakhov
- 2016 Viking (film) as Sveneld, voivode of the Grand Duke Sviatoslav Igorevich
- 2019 Dark like the Night. Karenina-2019 (short film) as Karenin
- 2020 One Breath (film) as Vadim Batyarov
- 2020 Masha as Uncle
- 2020 Hypnosis as Volkov
- 2021 The North Wind (film) as Cousin Boris

== Personal life ==
His first wife was actress and educator Darya Mikhailova; their daughter, Vasilisa—an educator and director—is a graduate of the acting department at the Shchukin Theatre Institute (born 1988).

His second wife was actress and singer Lada Maris; they have a daughter, Sofya (born 1993).

His third wife is journalist, writer, photographer, and screenwriter Eteri Chalandziya.
