= The Horde (2012 film) =

2012 Russian historical film

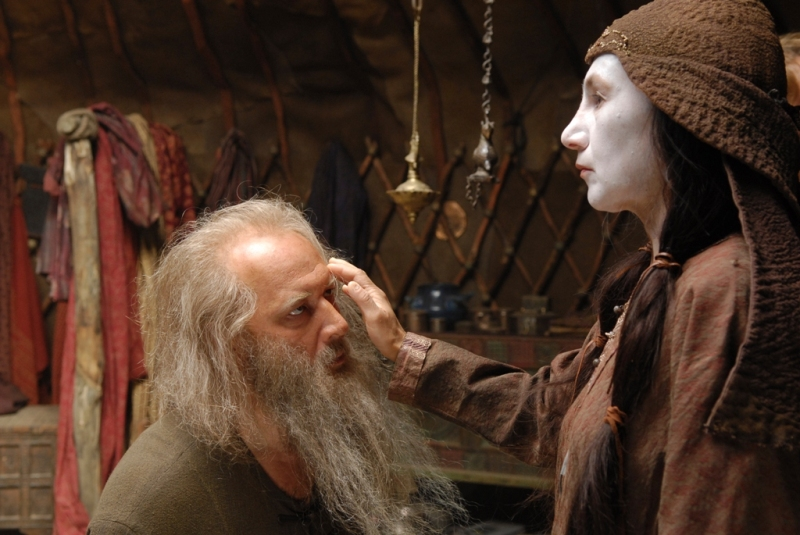
- Directed by: Andrei Proshkin
- Written by: Yuri Arabov
- Produced by: Natalya Gostyushina; Sergey Kravets
- Starring: Maksim Sukhanov; Roza Hairullina; Andrei Panin
- Cinematography: Yury Raysky
- Music by: Alexey Aygi
- Production company: Pravoslavnaya Entsiklopedia (Orthodox Encyclopædia)
- Release date: June 24, 2012 (Moscow)
- Running time: 127 minutes
- Country: Russia
- Languages: Russian, Karachay-Balkar, Italian
- Budget: $12 million

The Horde (Russian title: Орда Orda, working title: Святитель Алексий Svyatitel Alexy; The Golden Empire in the UK) is a 2012 historical film directed by Andrei Proshkin and written by Yuri Arabov. The film is a highly fictionalised narrative of how Saint Alexius healed Taydula Khatun, the mother of the Golden Horde khan Jani Beg, from blindness.

== Plot ==
In 1357 Jani Beg (Innokenty Dakayarov) kills his brother Khan Tini Beg (Andrey Panin) and replaces him as ruler of the Golden Horde, a division of the Mongol Empire. Soon, his mother Taydula (Roza Hairullina) goes blind and Jani Beg is desperate to have her eyesight restored. Meanwhile, Alexius, Metropolitan of Moscow (Maxim Sukhanov), has become famous as a miracle worker, and Jani Beg asks Ivan the Fair (Vitaly Khaev) to hand Alexius to him as a healer. Alexius is reluctant but Ivan sees this as a rare opportunity to delay the inevitable Tatar attack on Moscow. Eventually, Alexius accepts and, accompanied by Jani Beg's retainers Timer (Fedot Lvov) and Badakyul (Aleksey Yegorov), travels to Saray-Jük with his keleynik Fedka (Aleksandr Yatsenko). They fail to cure Taydula's blindness and Alexius is banished. Alexius and Fedka are then sent to work the furnaces under the bath of the khan, the latter being sent for desecrating the threshold. After a period of suffering and the subsequent sanctification of Alexius, Taydula's eyes are healed. Alexius and Fedka return to Moscow. Shortly after, Jani Beg is assassinated by his son Berdi Beg (Moge Oorzhak).

== Language ==
Most of the dialogue in The Horde is in the Karachay-Balkar language (with Russian overdub in the theatrical release). The filmmakers considered Karachay-Balkar to be the living language most closely resembling Kipchak spoken by the 14th century Golden Horde. Nevertheless, none of the actors of Turkic extraction are native speakers of the language; Dakayarov, Lvov, and Yegorov are Yakuts, whereas Hairullina is Volga Tatar.

== Accolades ==
- 34th Moscow International Film Festival:
  - "Silver George" for the best director: Andrey Proshkin
  - "Silver George" for the best actress: Roza Hairullina
  - Jury NETPAC Prize: "Admirable combination of perfect cinematic images together with a strong idea of mercy in the times of severe oppression".
