= The Role =

- Directed by: Konstantin Lopushansky
- Written by: Pavel Finn; Konstantin Lopushanskiy
- Produced by: Andrey Sigle
- Cinematography: Dmitriy Mass
- Edited by: Sergey Obukhov
- Music by: Andrey Sigle
- Release dates: 25 June 2013 (MIFF); 30 September 2013
- Running time: 132 minutes
- Country: Russia
- Language: Russian

The Role (Russian: Роль, romanized: Rol) is a 2013 Russian drama film directed by Konstantin Lopushansky and starring Maksim Sukhanov. It tells the story of an actor who begins to act as his doppelgänger, a revolutionary leader in the newly established Soviet Russia. The film is in black and white.

It was shown in competition at the 35th Moscow International Film Festival. It received the Nika Award for Best Screenplay.

== Plot ==
The story begins in 1919 in Siberia. A young provincial actor, Nikolai Yevlakhov, travels with units of the White Army from station to station, trying to escape the Reds. At the station of Rytva, the Reds succeed in capturing the train in which Yevlakhov is travelling. They decide to execute the White officers. To separate the military from the civilians, the Red commander Plotnikov walks along the line, unilaterally deciding who will live and who will die. In Yevlakhov, he recognises a man who resembles himself.

Suddenly, White cavalry breaks through to the station and a fierce battle ensues. Plotnikov is killed, and the prisoners scatter—among them Yevlakhov. Having been raised in the aesthetic of symbolism and the theory that the highest form of acting is to perform in the 'decorations' of real life, he regards everything that has happened to him as a unique opportunity to perform an unthinkable feat of art, of which only an actor is capable. Yevlakhov begins to gather materials about Plotnikov, a well-known Red commander in Siberia. After carefully devising a legend of his resurrection, Yevlakhov crosses the border into Finland, with the help of smugglers, where he has emigrated after the Civil War. From this moment on, he becomes Plotnikov.

His acting talent allows him to convince everyone—even friends who had known Plotnikov closely—that he is the legendary Siberian red commander (krasny komandir) who survived a terrible wound and partially lost his memory. Step by step, as he increasingly immerses himself in the world of his character, Yevlakhov begins to perceive this new life as his own. He performs the play of another's life to its end. The finale comes very soon.

== Cast ==
- Maksim Sukhanov as Nikolai Yevlakhov
- Aleksandr Efremov as Igrok
- Anna Geller as Spiridonov's Wife
- Yuriy Itskov as Odintsov, Smuggler
- Maria Järvenhelmi as Amalia
- Boris Kamorzin as Grigoriy
- Leonid Mozgovoy as Uhov
- Vasiliy Reutov as The Officer from the Train
- Anastasiya Sheveleva as Olga
- Dmitriy Sutyrin as Spiridonov
