= 16th Moscow International Film Festival =

Film festival

- Location: Moscow, Soviet Union
- Founded: 1959
- Awards: Grand Prix
- Festival date: 7–18 July 1989
- Website: Website

The 16th Moscow International Film Festival was held from 7 to 18 July 1989. The Golden St. George was awarded to the Italian film The Icicle Thief directed by Maurizio Nichetti.

== Jury ==
- Andrzej Wajda (Poland – President of the Jury)
- George Gund (United States)
- Emir Kusturica (Yugoslavia)
- Jiří Menzel (Czechoslovakia)
- Ibrahim Moussa (Italy)
- Aparna Sen (India)
- Jos Stelling (Netherlands)
- Kora Tsereteli (USSR)
- Zhang Yimou (China)

== Films in competition ==
The following films were selected for the main competition:

| English title | Original title | Director(s) | Production country |
|---|---|---|---|
| Ariel | Ariel | Aki Kaurismäki | Finland |
| Come Come Come Upward | Aje Aje Bara Aje | Im Kwon-taek | South Korea |
| Inventory | Stan posiadania | Krzysztof Zanussi | Poland |
| Jesus Christ's Horoscope | Jézus Krisztus horoszkópja | Miklós Jancsó | Hungary |
| Grand Cinema | Grand Cinema | Hassan Hedayat | Iran |
| A Tale of Adam Mickiewicz's 'Forefathers' Eve' | Lawa. Opowiesc o 'Dziadach' Adama Mickiewicza | Tadeusz Konwicki | Poland |
| The Discarnates | Ijintachi to no Natsu | Nobuhiko Obayashi | Japan |
| A Visitor to a Museum | Posetitel muzeya | Konstantin Lopushansky | Soviet Union, Switzerland, West Germany |
| The Icicle Thief | Ladri di saponette | Maurizio Nichetti | Italy |
| The 15 Year Old Girl | La Fille de 15 ans | Jacques Doillon | France |
| The Rainbow | The Rainbow | Ken Russell | Great Britain |
| The Shining Arc | Hu guang | Zhang Junzhao | China |
| Follow Me | Follow Me | Maria Knilli | West Germany |
| The Accidental Tourist | The Accidental Tourist | Lawrence Kasdan | United States |
| The Way Steel Was Tempered | Tako se kalio čelik | Želimir Žilnik | Yugoslavia |
| A Hoof Here, a Hoof There | Kopytem sem, kopytem tam | Věra Chytilová | Czechoslovakia |
| Love Lies | Mentiras piadosas | Arturo Ripstein | Mexico |
| Ironweed | Ironweed | Héctor Babenco | United States |
| I Never Been in Vienna | Nunca estuve en Viena | Antonio Larreta | Argentina |
| Jadup and Boel | Jadup und boel | Rainer Simon | East Germany |

== Awards ==
- Golden St. George: The Icicle Thief by Maurizio Nichetti
- Silver St. George: A Visitor to a Museum by Konstantin Lopushansky
- Bronze St. George:
  - Actor: Turo Pajala for Ariel
  - Actress: Kang Soo-yeon for Come Come Come Upward
- Prix FIPRESCI: Ariel by Aki Kaurismäki
- Prix of Ecumenical Jury: A Visitor to a Museum by Konstantin Lopushansky
- Special Diploma: Bonded Woman by B. Narsing Rao (non-competition film)
