= Turo Pajala =

Finnish actor

Turo Pajala (16 November 1955 − 28 February 2007) was a Finnish actor.

Pajala played the leading role as an unemployed coal miner Taisto Kasurinen in an Aki Kaurismäki film Ariel, and won the Bronze St. George award for Best Actor at the 16th Moscow International Film Festival. He also played many supporting roles in films and on television.

Pajala's personal life took a downturn after Ariel, when he withdrew from the public eye. He made his final film appearance in 1998 in a Joona Tena film Kulkurin taivas. His final work in television came in 2007 with the role of a Christmas tree salesman in a television series Taivaan tulet.

Turo Pajala's father Erkki Pajala (1929–1992) was also an actor. He had one daughter from his first marriage to actress Aino Seppo.

== Selected filmography ==
- Pimeys odottaa (1985)
- Näkemiin, hyvästi (1986)
- Hamlet liikemaailmassa (1987)
- Ariel (1988)
- Tuhlaajapoika (1992)
- Pilkkuja ja pikkuhousuja (1992)
- Palkkasoturi (1997)
