= Art horror =

Film genre

Art horror or arthouse horror (sometimes called elevated horror) is a sub-genre of both horror films and art films. It explores and experiments with the artistic uses of horror.

== Characteristics ==
Art-horror films tend to rely on atmosphere building, psychological character development, cinematic style and philosophical themes for effect – rather than straightforward scares.

=== History ===
Art-horror films have been described as "a fascinating byproduct of the collision of art and commerce, of genre convention and personal vision". Historically, the genre was loosely related to J-horror and Italian Giallo. In the 2000s, a movement of transgressive films in France known as "New French Extremity" has been described as an arthouse horror film movement.

Although commentators have suggested some horror films have exemplified qualities applicable to "art horror" for many decades, the term became more widely used during the 2010s, with independent film company A24 credited with popularising the genre. The term "elevated horror" was first used in the early 2010s, and subsequently has been the subject of criticism and debate among film critics as it became more widely used.

=== Definition ===
In his book Art-Horror (2023) Adrian Gmelch identifies 4 aspects that can be an orientation for the definition of art-horror:

- (1) Film historical and artistic imprinting,
- (2) horror as a message vehicle,
- (3) recurring motifs and stylistic elements, and
- (4) unique visual identity and aesthetics.

== Notable art horror films ==
=== 20th century ===
- The Cabinet of Dr. Caligari (Robert Wiene, 1920)
- Haxan (Benjamin Christensen, 1922)
- Nosferatu (F.W. Murnau, 1922)
- The Lodger: A Story of the London Fog (Alfred Hitchcock, 1927)
- M (Fritz Lang, 1931)
- Vampyr (Carl Theodor Dreyer, 1932)
- The Bride of Frankenstein (James Whale, 1935)
- Cat People (Jacques Tourneur, 1942)
- The Leopard Man (Jacques Tourneur, 1943)
- I Walked with a Zombie (Jacques Tourneur, 1943)
- Black Sunday (Mario Bava, 1960)
- Eyes without a Face (Georges Franju, 1960)
- Psycho (Alfred Hitchcock, 1960)
- The Innocents (Jack Clayton, 1961)
- Carnival of Souls (Herk Harvey, 1962)
- Blood and Black Lace (Mario Bava, 1964)
- Kwaidan (Masaki Kobayashi, 1964)
- Repulsion (Roman Polanski, 1965)
- Onibaba (Kaneto Shindo, 1965)
- Hour of the Wolf (Ingmar Bergman, 1968)
- Night of the Living Dead (George A. Romero, 1968)
- Rosemary's Baby (Roman Polanski, 1968)
- Images (Robert Altman, 1972)
- Sisters (Brian De Palma, 1972)
- Ganja and Hess (Bill Gunn, 1973)
- Don't Look Now (Nicloas Roeg, 1973)
- The Exorcist (William Friedkin, 1973)
- Flesh for Frankenstein (Paul Morrissey, 1973)
- The Wicker Man (Robin Hardy, 1973)
- Blood for Dracula (Paul Morrissey, 1974)
- Picnic at Hanging Rock (Peter Weir, 1975)
- The Tenant (Roman Polanski, 1976)
- Eraserhead (David Lynch, 1977)
- Exorcist II: The Heretic (John Boorman, 1977)
- Opening Night (John Cassavetes, 1977)
- Suspiria (Dario Argento, 1977)
- House (Nobuhiko Obayashi, 1977)
- The Brood (David Cronenberg, 1979)
- The Driller Killer (Abel Ferrara, 1979)
- Vengeance Is Mine (Shōhei Imamura, 1979)
- Nosferatu the Vampyre (Werner Herzog, 1979)
- Altered States (Ken Russell, 1980)
- The Shining (Stanley Kubrick, 1980)
- Possession (Andrzej Zulawski, 1981)
- Videodrome (David Cronenberg, 1983)
- The Hunger (Tony Scott, 1983)
- Henry: Portrait of a Serial Killer (John McNaughton, 1986)
- Wicked City (Yoshiaki Kawajiri, 1987)
- Angel Heart (Alan Parker, 1987)
- The Vanishing (George Sluizer, 1988)
- Santa Sangre (Alejandro Jodorowsky, 1989)
- Tetsuo: The Iron Man (Shinya Tsukamoto, 1989)
- Jacob's Ladder (Adrian Lyne, 1990)
- Naked Lunch (David Cronenberg, 1991)
- The Silence of the Lambs (Jonathan Demme, 1991)
- Twin Peaks: Fire Walk with Me (David Lynch, 1992)
- Cronos (Guillermo del Toro, 1993)
- Safe (Todd Haynes, 1995)
- The Addiction (Abel Ferrara, 1995)
- Funny Games (Michael Haneke, 1997)
- Perfect Blue (Satoshi Kon, 1997)
- Audition (Takashi Miike, 1999)

=== 21st century ===
- The Devil's Backbone (Guillermo del Toro, 2001)
- Donnie Darko (Richard Kelly, 2001)
- Mulholland Drive (David Lynch, 2001)
- Trouble Every Day (Claire Denis, 2001)
- High Tension (Alexandre Aja, 2003)
- The Host (Bong Joon Ho, 2006)
- Pan's Labyrinth (Guillermo del Toro, 2006)
- Inland Empire (David Lynch, 2006)
- Frontier(s) (Xavier Gens, 2007)
- Martyrs (Pascal Laugier, 2008)
- Let the Right One In (Tomas Alfredson, 2008)
- Coraline (Henry Selick, 2009)
- Antichrist (Lars von Trier, 2009)
- Black Swan (Darren Aronofsky, 2010)
- Beyond the Black Rainbow (Panos Cosmatos, 2010)
- A Field in England (Ben Wheatley, 2013)
- Under the Skin (Jonathan Glazer, 2013)
- Only Lovers Left Alive (Jim Jarmusch, 2013)
- Enemy (Denis Villeneuve, 2013)
- The Babadook (Jennifer Kent, 2014)
- It Follows (David Robert Mitchell), 2014)
- The Lure (Agnieszka Smoczyńska, 2015)
- The Witch (Robert Eggers, 2015)
- The Neon Demon (Nicholas Winding Refn, 2016)
- The Love Witch (Anna Biller, 2016)
- Shin Godzilla (Hideaki Anno, 2016)
- Raw (Julia Ducournau, 2016)
- Kizumonogatari (Tatsuya Oishi, 2016)
- Mother! (Darren Aronofsky, 2017)
- Get Out (Jordan Peele, 2017)
- It Comes at Night (Trey Edward Shults, 2017)
- The Killing of a Sacred Deer (Yorgos Lanthimos, 2017)
- One Cut of the Dead (Shin'ichirō Ueda, 2017)
- Hereditary (Ari Aster, 2018)
- A Quiet Place (John Krasinski, 2018)
- Annihilation (Alex Garland, 2018)
- Climax (Gaspar Noé, 2018)
- The House That Jack Built (Lars von Trier, 2018)
- Possum (Matthew Holness, 2018)
- Suspiria (Luca Guadagnino, 2018)
- Mandy (Panos Cosmatos, 2018)
- The Wolf House (Cristobal León & Joaquín Cociña, 2018)
- Us (Jordan Peele, 2019)
- Midsommar (Ari Aster, 2019)
- The Lighthouse (Robert Eggers, 2019)
- Saint Maud (Rose Glass, 2019)
- The Platform (Galder Gaztelu-Urrutia, 2019)
- Roh (Emir Ezwan, 2019)
- Relic (Natalie Erika James, 2020)
- Friend of the World (Brian Patrick Butler, 2020)
- Dawn Breaks Behind the Eyes (Kevin Kopacka, 2021)
- Lamb (Valdimar Jóhannsson, 2021)
- We're All Going to the World's Fair (Jane Schoenbrun, 2021)
- Titane (Julia Ducournau, 2021)
- Nope (Jordan Peele, 2022)
- Barbarian (Zach Cregger, 2022)
- The Menu (Mark Mylod, 2022)
- Men (Alex Garland, 2022)
- Skinamarink (Kyle Edward Ball, 2022)
- Talk to Me (Danny and Michael Philippou, 2022)
- Beau Is Afraid (Ari Aster, 2023)
- Emesis Blue (Chad Payne, 2023)
- Late Night with the Devil (Colin and Cameron Cairnes, 2023)
- I Saw the TV Glow (Jane Schoenbrun, 2024)
- The Substance (Coralie Fargeat, 2024)
- Longlegs (Oz Perkins, 2024)
- Heretic (Scott Beck and Bryan Woods, 2024)
- Nosferatu (Robert Eggers, 2024)
- Bring Her Back (Danny and Michael Philippou, 2025)
- The Holy Boy (Paolo Strippoli, 2025)

== Notable directors ==
- Alexandre Aja
- Joko Anwar
- Dario Argento
- Ari Aster
- Mario Bava
- Ingmar Bergman
- Panos Cosmatos
- David Cronenberg
- Danny and Michael Philippou
- Brian de Palma
- Guillermo del Toro
- Claire Denis
- Julia Ducournau
- Robert Eggers
- Abel Ferrara
- Georges Franju
- Michael Haneke
- Herk Harvey
- Werner Herzog
- Alfred Hitchcock
- Richard Kelly
- Stanley Kubrick
- David Lynch
- Takashi Miike
- Paul Morrissey
- Jordan Peele
- Oz Perkins
- Roman Polanski
- Nicholas Roeg
- George A. Romero
- Jacques Tourneur
- Marina de Van
- Lars von Trier
- Peter Weir

== See also ==
- Arthouse animation
- Social thriller
- New Hollywood
- New French Extremity
- Arthouse musical
- Arthouse science fiction film
- Vulgar auteurism
- Extreme cinema
- Postmodern horror
- Comedy horror
- Analog horror
