= Alexandra (2007 film) =

- Directed by: Alexander Sokurov
- Written by: Aleksandr Sokurov
- Produced by: Andrey Sigle
- Starring: Galina Vishnevskaya
- Release date: 2007
- Running time: 90 minutes
- Country: Russia
- Language: Russian

Alexandra (Russian: Александра, translit. Aleksandra) is a 2007 Russian film about the Second Chechen War, written and directed by Alexander Sokurov. It was nominated for the Palme d'Or at the 2007 Cannes Film Festival. It received generally positive reviews from critics.

== Plot ==
Aleksandra Nikolaevna is invited by her grandson, Denis, a senior lieutenant (Stárshiy Leytenánt) in the Russian Army, to visit his military base in Chechnya. Her journey is aided by soldiers who have been ordered to be her escorts. But it is a lawless land; the two young happy-go-lucky conscripts who assist Nikolaevna on to an armoured train are assailed shortly after saying goodbye at the station.

On arrival at the army camp, Aleksandra is taken to her grandson's platoon area and told to wait. But she refuses to sit inside the tents because of the sweltering summer heat. Wandering around, she meets and interacts with the young soldiers on the base. Many are standoffish at first but soon, after she shares some pies, some begin to talk to her. She returns to the tents to find Denis had returned. They hug and exchange pleasantries. Later Aleksandra meets her grandson's commanding officer who shows her around the base; he also questions her as to her reasons for visiting. He explains that Denis is a good officer but the request asking for permission for his grandmother to visit was bemusing.

The next day she decides to leave the cantonments and visit the local market despite the reservations of the soldiers on guard duty. Nevertheless, she insists on going so they then ask her to get cigarettes and biscuits. In the town she discovers that many of the locals are hostile towards her because she is Russian. However she soon starts talking to an elderly Chechen woman named Malika who explains she was a teacher before the war. The local lady explains that many of the young people have been irreparably changed by the fighting. Malika gives Aleksandra some cigarettes and biscuits before inviting her back to her war-ravaged apartment where they drink tea and talk.

Aleksandra thanks Malika and promises to return and pay her for the supplies. A local boy is then asked to take Aleksandra back to the Russian army camp. Although initially aggressive to her because she is a Russian, his attitude softens when she tells him that people should not be labelled together and that intelligence is more powerful than war. On arrival back at base, Aleksandra distributes the cigarettes and biscuits among the soldiers. Some then take her to a mess where she is given a hot meal. Aleksandra then returns to Denis' quarters where she finds her grandson mulling over his life in the army after he had to strike a soldier for disobeying him. After talking about their lives (she wants to live more even though her body is getting old), Denis soon brightens up and plaits his grandmother's hair while she promises to find him a wife.

The next day, Aleksandra is woken up by Denis who tells her she has to leave now because he and his men are going on a five-day mission. Slowly the elderly lady gathers her things before making one last walk through the camp saying goodbye to the soldiers she met. At the gate, she says goodbye to Denis as he climbs onto an armoured vehicle and to his commanding officer who silently acknowledges the good her trip has done to her grandson and the men under his command.

Aleksandra then walks back to town where she meets Malika and her local friends. Refusing to take any money for the cigarettes and biscuits, the group walk Aleksandra back to the armoured train. Aleksandra gives Malika her address asking her to come and visit her in Russia. She then boards a rolling car. The train moves off with Aleksandra waving from the doorway. With the train's departure, Malika turns and walks away with a grim expression. Aleksandra rides along looking out across the desolate empty fields of Chechnya.

== Cast ==
- Galina Vishnevskaya as Aleksandra Nikolaevna
- Vasily Shevtsov as Denis
- Raisa Gichaeva as Malika
- Andrei Bogdanov
- Aleksandr Kladko
- Aleksei Neymyshev
- Rustam Shakhgireev
- Evgeniy Tkachuk

== Production ==
The film was shot on location in and around Grozny the capital of Chechnya.

Producer Andrey Sigle also wrote the score.

== Reception ==
The film received positive reviews from critics, although some reviewers found it to be slow and difficult to sit through. Alexandra has an approval rating of 88% on review aggregator website Rotten Tomatoes, based on 57 reviews, and an average rating of 7.5/10.The website's critical consensus states, "At once ethereal and tangible, Aleksandr Sokurov's humane Chechen War drama features a spectacular turn by opera star Galina Vishnevskay". Metacritic reported the film had an average score of 85 out of 100, based on 13 reviews, indicating "universal acclaim".

Manohla Dargis of The New York Times named it the 3rd best film of 2008, Michael Phillips of the Chicago Tribune named it the 6th best film of 2008 and Bill White of the Seattle Post-Intelligencer named it the 8th best film of 2008.

However, David Fear of Time Out: New York wrote: "Sokurov prefers the sort of deliberate pace that tests ADD-afflicted viewers. This isn’t an opinion: He’s an unapologetic practitioner of crafting "difficult" films, and a member of a slow-and-low legacy that extends from Antonioni to Akerman, from Tarkovsky to Tarr."

Japanese film critic Shigehiko Hasumi listed the film as one of the best films of 2000–2009.
