= 24 Hours (2000 film) =

- Russian: 24 часа
- Directed by: Aleksandr Atanesyan
- Written by: Aleksandr Atanesyan; Natalya Koretskaya
- Produced by: Tamara Fataliyeva; Evgeniy Gindilis; Igor Tolstunov
- Starring: Maksim Sukhanov; Andrey Panin; Sergei Novikov; Mikhail Kozakov; Tatyana Samoylova
- Cinematography: Aleksey Rodionov; Masha Solovyova
- Edited by: Olga Grinshpun
- Music by: Pavel Zhagun
- Release date: 2000
- Country: Russia
- Language: Russian

24 Hours (Russian: 24 часа) is a 2000 Russian crime film directed by Aleksandr Atanesyan.

== Plot ==
The film tells about the killer Felix, who carries out an expensive order, despite the warning. The one whom the customer called the oilman was quietly killed, which makes the performer think that he will not be forgiven for the murder. Felix now has only 24 hours to get to the island, where his beloved woman and money are waiting for him.

== Cast ==
- Maksim Sukhanov as Felix
- Andrey Panin as Lyova Shalamov
- Sergei Novikov as Garik Shalamov
- Mikhail Kozakov as Kosta
- Tatyana Samoylova as mother
- Igor Starygin as Lawyer
- Georgiy Taratorkin as General
- Natalya Rogozhkina as Lyusya
- Vladimir Eryomin as Vernik
- Dmitriy Mukhamadeev as Sergeant
