= Dana Agisheva =

Russian actress

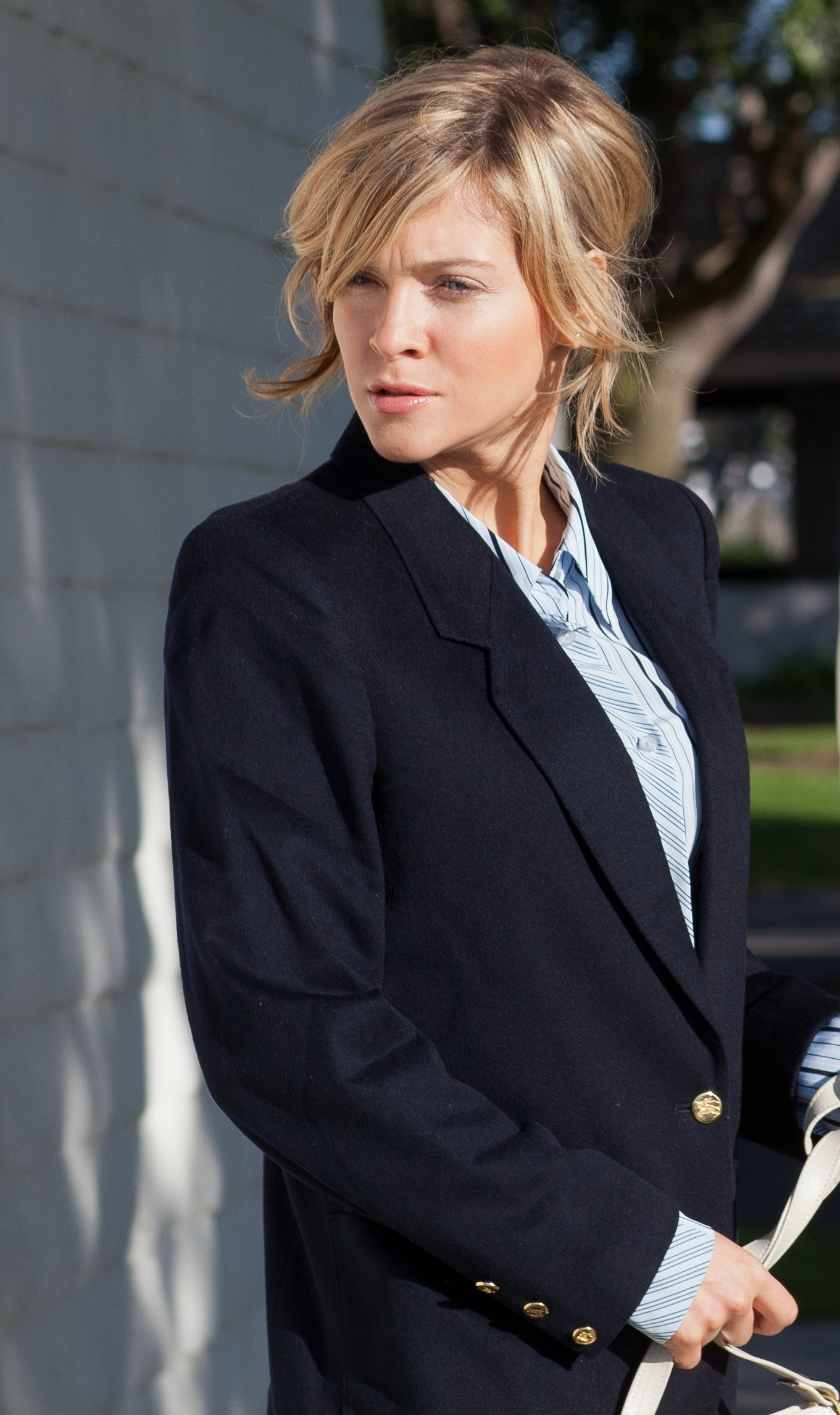
- Agisheva in 2016
- Born: Dania Odelshevna Agisheva; 30 December 1980 (age 45); Tashkent, Uzbek SSR, USSR
- Occupation: Actress
- Years active: 2002–present
- Website: agisheva.com

Dania (Dana) Odelshevna Agisheva (Russian: Дания́ (Да́на) Одельше́вна Аги́шева) is a Russian actress.

== Early life and education ==
Born in family of playwright, professor of VGIK's Odelsha Agishev. She graduated from the Romano-German Department of the faculty of Philology of MSU.

== Awards ==
Agisheva won awards at Kinoshock and Pacific Meridian film festivals, and was nominated for the Golden Eagle Award in 2012.

== Filmography ==
- 2002: Three Against All as Tanya (TV series)
- 2003: Angel on the Road as episode (TV series)
- 2004: Remote Access as Zhenya
- 2004: Young and Happy as Inga
- 2005: Garpastum as Nina
- 2006: Worm as Jungia
- 2006: Ostrog. Case Fyodor Sechenov as Christina
- 2007: The Best Time of the Year as Valentina (first age)
- 2008: Dark Planet as Speaker-informant
- 2009: Reflections as Julia (TV series)
- 2009: The Tatar Princess as Anna Akhmatova in 1910 / Anna Kaminskaya
- 2010: The Reverse Movement as episode
- 2010: Prison Break as Nadezhda (TV series)
- 2011: Object 11 as Elena Nechaeva (TV series)
- 2011: Elena as episode
- 2012: Alien Face as Virginia
- 2013: Everything Will Be Fine as Nadya
- 2014: Beach as Angela (TV series)
- 2017: The One Who Reads Minds (The Mentalist) as Nadya Kostrova (TV series)
- 2018: White Crows as Anya (post-production)
