= The Turn of the Century =

2001 film by Konstantin Lopushansky

Turn of the Century
- Directed by: Konstantin Lopushansky
- Written by: Konstantin Lopushanskiy
- Produced by: Ada Staviskaya
- Cinematography: Yevgeni Gurevich; Nikolai Pokoptsev
- Music by: Valeri Belinov
- Release dates: 1 September 2001 (Telluride); 31 January 2002
- Running time: 124 minutes
- Country: Russia
- Language: Russian

The Turn of the Century (Russian: Конец века, romanized: Konets veka) is a 2001 Russian drama film directed by Konstantin Lopushansky. The narrative is set a few years after the fall of the Soviet Union, and follows a Russian female journalist and her mother, as the mother is offered to erase her memories at a clinic so she will be able to adapt to the new lifestyle.

== Cast ==
- Svetlana Svirko as Olga
- Irina Sokolova
- Roman Viktyuk
- Aleksandr Baluev
- Dmitriy Shevchenko

== Reception ==
Variety's Todd McCarthy wrote:

Dostoevskian in its dour pessimism, this first film in seven years by Tarkovsky protege Konstantin Lopushansky overflows with such sorrow for the moral blankness it finds in Mother Russia today that it is hard not to sympathize to some degree with so deeply felt an expression of angst. But the film is decidedly heavy going, its symbols and messages advanced with unfortunate bluntness, meaning that even its intended audience on the high art end of the fest and international specialized circuit will have to overlook the cumbersome dramatics to appreciate its insights.

The film was nominated for the Nika Award for Best Screenplay.
