= Vyacheslav Rybakov =

Russian science fiction author and an orientalist (born 1954)

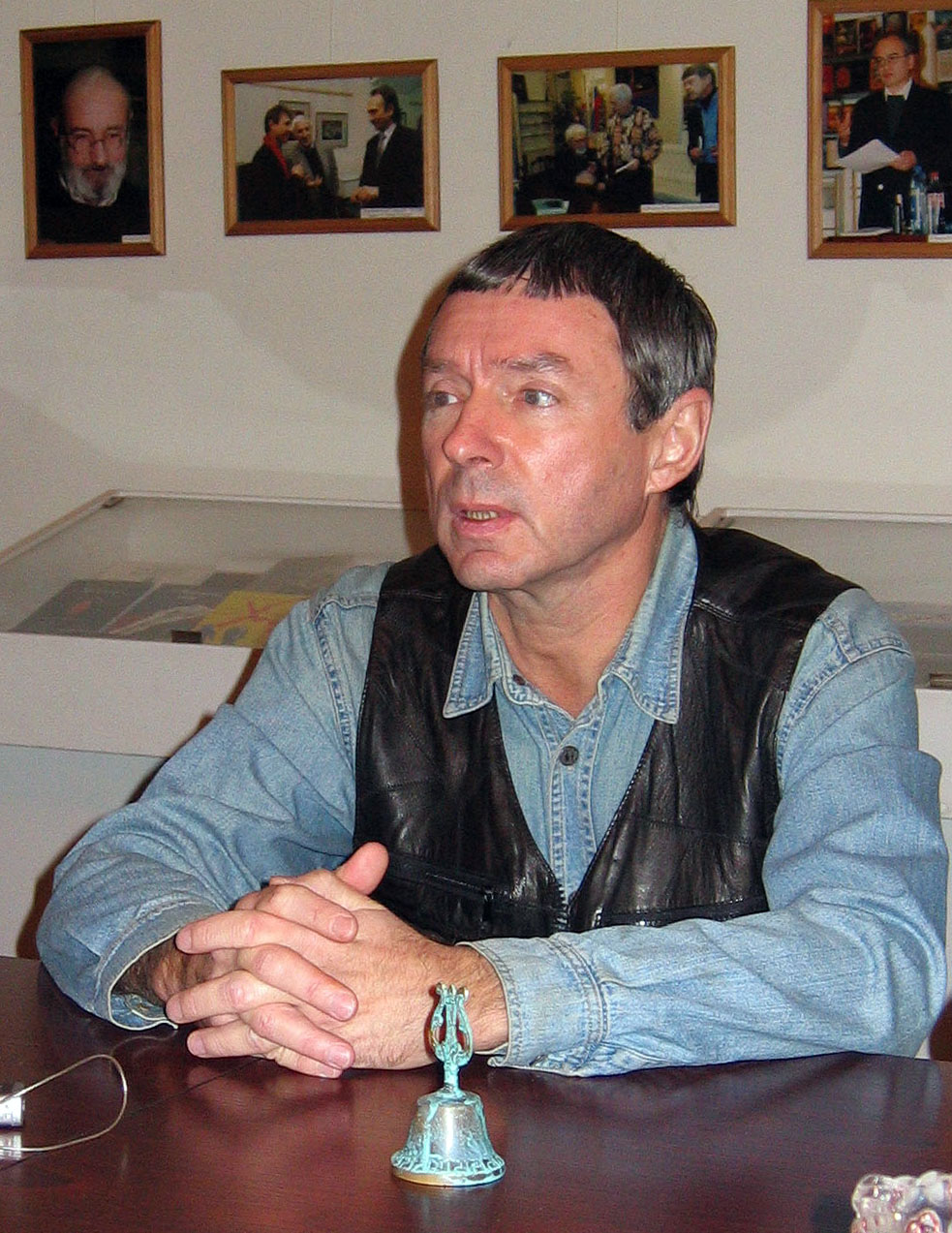
- Born: 19 January 1954 (age 72); Leningrad, Russian SFSR, Soviet Union (now Saint Petersburg, Russia)
- Education: Leningrad State University
- Occupation: Playwright
- Writing career
- Genre: Science Fiction

Vyacheslav Rybakov (Russian: Вячеслав Михайлович Рыбаков; born January 1954 in Leningrad), is a Russian science fiction author and an orientalist, interested in the medieval bureaucracy of China. He is a frequent collaborator with science fiction director Konstantin Lopushansky. Screenwriting for his films The Ugly Swans, based on the 1972 novel by Arkady and Boris Strugatsky. As well as Dead Man's Letters in 1986, which he would later receive a Governmental Award of the RSFSR for the screenplay in 1987 after its premiere at the Toronto Film Festival.

== Biography ==
Rybakov graduated from the Oriental Studies Department of the Leningrad State University in 1976, mostly focusing on writings about the medieval bureaucracy of China and started. Soon after he studied at the Leningrad branch of the USSR Academy of Sciences Oriental Institute where he was able to publish over 40 thesis papers. While studying at Leningrad, the KGB had gained access to rough drafts of his anti-Soviet novel Trust due to Rybakov sending drafts to friends and classmates. This resulted in the copies being seized by the KGB and a warning. Although the KGB has checked in with Rybakov several years later, Rybakov insisted on writing the final draft of the novel using previous remaining drafts and memory. The novel was later published a decade later. In 1983, Rybakov had met Konstantin Lopushansky to discuss writing the screenplay for his film Dead Man's Letters. The process of developing the film allowed both artists to freely express their visions for the production of the film and further productions further on, this was a stark contrast to Russia's strict censorship rules at the time.

== Science fiction ==
Among Rybakov's works were first published and include the prize-winning novels: Fireplace on a Tower (Ochag na bashne, 1990), and Gravilyot Tsesarevitch (1993) which depicts an alternative world featuring a Russian Empire in which communism is merely a religion, and our world is just an insane scientific experiment.

His Death of Ivan Ilyich (1997) reveals the inner world of a contemporary person in a moment before his death.

The novel Na budushchiy god v Moskve (In the adjacent year in Moscow, 2003) explores a Russia torn apart into small, poor countries, ruled by those idealists of the late Soviet Union who sincerely hated totalitarianism but didn't notice any good features of the nation, ruined the whole system of government and survived with help of the West. In the story, space is ruled by Darths and Vaders, and a Russian rocket scientist Ivan Obiwankin attempts to resurrect his people's feelings of nationalism by launching his own space ship.

Rybakov preaches equality of cultures and states that cultures are often based on restrictions, and that simply removing the restrictions as anti-democratic may ruin the culture. Rybakov's novel also examines the Russian mentality, criticizing its tendency to understand and agree with the positions of others as an inappropriate way to deal with the encroaching Western civilization. He argues that all living civilizations are unique, and that in the future it may become essential to save some other civilization from stagnation, because a world ruled by only one civilization has no future.

He shows through an example of the ruined family of the main character Alexey that,

"the surest way for you to cease being esteemed and appreciated... even just loved... is to implicitly cede something essential and principal."

Vyacheslav Rybakov and Igor Alimov were also the authors of “There Are No Bad People. A Eurasian Symphony” (Плохих людей нет. Евразийская симфония), written under the pseudonym Holm van Zaichik. The series tells the story of the world of the Orduss, a fictional country with a humane and rich culture, that unifies lands of China, Russia and the Near East.

== English translations ==
- Artist (Story)
- The Trial Sphere (Story)
