= Theatrical Novel (film) =

- Russian: Театральный роман
- Directed by: Oleg Babitsky; Yury Goldin
- Written by: Mikhail Bulgakov
- Starring: Igor Larin; Maksim Sukhanov; Nikolay Chindyaykin; Valeriy Zolotukhin; Natalya Kolyakanova
- Cinematography: Artur Gimpel
- Release date: 2002
- Country: Russia
- Language: Russian

Theatrical Novel (Russian: Театральный роман) is a 2002 Russian mystery comedy-drama film directed by Oleg Babitsky and Yury Goldin.

== Plot ==
The film tells the story of the production of Bulgakov's play on the stage of the Moscow Art Theater.

== Cast ==
- Igor Larin as Sergey Leontievich Maksudov
- Maksim Sukhanov as Pyotr Bombardov / Ivan Vasilyevitch
- Nikolay Chindyaykin
- Valeriy Zolotukhin
- Natalya Kolyakanova as Ludmila Silvestrovna Pryakhina
- Emmanuil Vitorgan as Gavriil Stepanovich
- Oksana Mysina as Poliksena Vasilyevna Toropetskaya
- Valentin Smirnitskiy as Ivan Aleksandrovich Poltoratskyj
- Dmitry Maryanov as Foma Strizh
- Vyacheslav Grishechkin as Makar Rvatsky
