= Viktor Mikhaylov (actor) =

Russian actor

- Born: 4 July 1951 (age 74); Leningrad, Russian SFSR, Soviet Union
- Occupation: Actor
- Years active: 1972 — present

Victor Vasilyevich Mikhaylov (Russian: Виктор Васильевич Михайлов; born 4 July 1951) is a Russian actor. He appeared in more than forty films since 1979.

In 1972 he graduated from the Belarusian Theatrical Institute.

== Selected filmography ==
Year	Title	Role	Notes
1979	Allegro Con Brio	Yuli Sergeevich Makarin	
1987	Dead Man's Letters		
1988	The Life of Klim Samgin	Inokov	
1989	Fallada: The Last Chapter	Soviet officer	
1989	A Visitor to a Museum	The Visitor	
1994	Russian Symphony	Ivan Mazaev	
2002	Russian Ark		
2002	Streets of Broken Lights	Pavel Vasilievich Smirnov	TV series
2006	The Ugly Swans	Mokrets Zinovy	
