= Remote Access (film) =

- Russian theatrical release poster
- Directed by: Svetlana Proskurina
- Written by: Svetlana Proskurina
- Produced by: Yuri Obukhov
- Starring: Dana Agisheva; Elena Rufanova; Vladimir Ilyin
- Cinematography: Aleksandr Burov; Sergey Yurizditsky
- Edited by: Sergey Ivanov
- Music by: Andrey Sigle
- Production company: Gorky Film Studio
- Release date: September 3, 2004
- Running time: 85 minutes
- Country: Russia
- Language: Russian

Remote Access (Russian: Удалённый доступ, romanized: Udalyonnyy dostup) is a Russian drama film directed by Svetlana Proskurina. It was nominated for the Golden Lion award at the 61st Venice International Film Festival.

== Cast ==
- Dana Agisheva as Zhenya
- Elena Rufanova as Vera, Zhenya's mother
- Vladimir Ilyin as Timofey, Vera's friend
- Aleksandr Plaksin as Sergey
- Fyodor Lavrov as Igor
- Sergey Dreyden as Sergey's father
- Igor Zolotovitsky as Andrey
