= Solo (1980 film) =

- Russian: Соло
- Directed by: Konstantin Lopushansky
- Written by: Albina Shulgina
- Starring: Nikolai Grinko; Lyudmila Arzhannikova; Valentina Smirnova; Viktor Gogolev; Nora Gryakalova
- Cinematography: Anatoly Lapshov
- Release date: 1980
- Running time: 29 minute
- Country: Soviet Union
- Language: Russian

Solo (Russian: Соло) is a 1980 Soviet World War II film directed by Konstantin Lopushansky.

== Plot ==
The film takes place in the besieged Leningrad in the winter of 1942. The film tells about the soloist of the symphony orchestra, which is preparing for a concert to be held at the Leningrad Philharmonic and broadcast in London.

== Cast ==
- Nikolai Grinko as Aleksandr Mihaylovich
- Lyudmila Arzhannikova
- Valentina Smirnova
- Viktor Gogolev
- Nora Gryakalova
- Kirill Gun
- Gelena Ivlieva as Housekeeper
- Yuri Radionov as Sergey
- Svetlana Smirnova as Pregnant woman in a bath
- Olga Volkova
