= Dust (2005 film) =

- Russian: Пыль
- Directed by: Sergey Loban
- Written by: Marina Potapova
- Produced by: Mikhail Sinev
- Starring: Aleksei Podolsky; Pyotr Mamonov; Nina Yelisova; Larisa Pyatnitskaya
- Cinematography: Dmitry Model
- Music by: Pavel Shevchenko
- Release date: July 14, 2005
- Running time: 109 minutes
- Country: Russia
- Language: Russian
- Budget: $3,000

Dust, Russian: Пыль (Pyl') is a 2001 science fiction comedy-drama film with a minimalistic budget of 3000 dollars that was released in 2005 in Russia. Its genre may be characterized as fantastic realism, or as an existential drama with elements of science fiction.

Practically unknown in the period between 2001 and 2005, the film was acclaimed at several Russian movie festivals, including XXVII Moscow International Film Festival and Kinoshock.

== Plot ==
The protagonist, Aleksei, is a passive young outsider with a bloated body and poor vision. He does a monotonous job at ZAO Progress company (a typical name of a post-Soviet enterprise converted from a military plant into a company producing consumer goods), strives for nothing, wants nothing, is interested in nothing at all. He dedicates his free time to gluing plastic models of aircraft, which is quite similar to what he does at work. He apparently has no parents, perhaps they died, and lives in his grandmother's apartment, who loves her grandson and buys him second-hand clothes up to her taste. She must be an ardent Christian, but rather an adherent of one of numerous non-traditional confessions that emerged in Russia after the perestroika.

One day the CEO of Aleksei's plant invites him to his office where he meets two FSB officers who offer him to "help the Motherland's science" and to take part in a secret experiment. The latter, unbeknownst to him, represents a machine that can produce an effect of realizing one's most cherished dreams, which in Aleksei's case is a perfect body. Once the experiment is completed, he is supposed to forget everything (and to die soon, as the machine's effect on humans is as devastating as radiation). However, from then on he is obsessed with the desire to find the mysterious machine and to feel perfect again and again.

== Starring ==
- Aleksei Podolsky — Aleksei;
- Pyotr Mamonov — professor Pushkar;
- Gleb Mikhailov — the Body;
- Oleg Novikov — Oleg, laboratory assistant;
- Nina Yelisova — Aleksei's grandmother;
