= Sergey Loban =

Russian film director

- Born: Sergey Vitalevich Loban; September 3, 1972 (age 52); Moscow, Soviet Union (now Russia)
- Citizenship: Russian Federation
- Occupation(s): film director, film editor

Sergey Vitalevich Loban (Russian: Сергей Витальевич Лобан; born September 3, 1972) - is a Russian film director and editor.

== Filmography ==
=== As director ===
- Sluchay s patsanom (2001)
- Dust (2005)
- Chapiteau-show (2011)

=== As editor ===
- Chapiteau-show (2011)
