= Vladimir Firsov =

Soviet writer and poet (1937–2011)

Vladimir Ivanovich Firsov (Russian: Влади́мир Ива́нович Фи́рсов; 1937 – 17 November 2011) was a Soviet and Russian poet and translator. He was a member of the CPSU since 1970.

For many years, he was a member of the editorial board Molodaya Gvardiya.

In the 1990s, amid the influx of new literature and new artistic approaches to the processes unfolding in the surrounding world, interest in Firsov’s work noticeably declined, yet his poetic voice was neither lost nor disappeared from the literary scene.

The collapse of the Soviet system gradually led the poet toward an Orthodox worldview and religious themes. During these years, he also served as the editor-in-chief of the magazine Rossiyane, a member of the Central Council of the nationwide movement Orthodox Russia, and, concurrently, one of the founders of the Council of the Smolensk Community. It is also noteworthy that Vladimir Firsov was a member of the jury for the All-Russian poetry competition held under the auspices of the “Board of Trustees of the Penal Enforcement System” in correctional facilities.

He was the author of more than 30 books of poetry and poems. He translated the poems into Russian from Bulgarian, Moldovan, Ukrainian, Chuvash and other languages.

He died on 17 November 2011, and is buried in Troyekurovskoye Cemetery in Moscow.

== Awards ==
- Order of the October Revolution
- Order of the Red Banner of Labour
- Order of the Badge of Honour (twice)
- Order "For Merit to the Fatherland" 4th class (2008)
- Lenin Komsomol Prize (1968)
- Prize of the Russian Government in the field of culture (2009)
