= Dead Man's Letters =

1986 film by Konstantin Lopushansky

Dead Man's Letters Письма мёртвого человека
- Film poster
- Directed by: Konstantin Lopushansky
- Written by: Konstantin Lopushansky; Vyacheslav Rybakov; Boris Strugatsky
- Starring: Rolan Bykov; Vatslav Dvorzhetsky
- Cinematography: Nikolai Pokoptsev
- Edited by: T. Poulinoi
- Music by: Aleksandr Zhurbin
- Production company: Lenfilm
- Distributed by: Lenfilm
- Release date: 15 September 1986 (Soviet Union)
- Running time: 88 minutes
- Country: Soviet Union
- Language: Russian

Dead Man's Letters (Russian: Письма мёртвого человека, romanized: Pis'ma myortvogo cheloveka), also known as Letters from a Dead Man, is a 1986 Soviet post-apocalyptic drama film directed and written by Konstantin Lopushansky. He wrote it along with Vyacheslav Rybakov and Boris Strugatsky. It marks his directorial debut.

The film was screened at the International Critics' Week section of the Cannes Film Festival in 1987 and received the FIPRESCI prize at the 35th International Filmfestival Mannheim-Heidelberg.

In the aftermath of nuclear apocalypse, a group of people are forced to live underground in bunkers. They cannot go outside their dwellings without wearing protective clothing and gas masks. They try to find hope in the disturbing new world. Among these people is a scientist who writes and recites letters to his son, who is missing and most likely dead.

== Plot ==
The film is set in an unspecified Western Bloc city after a nuclear war; the city is a radioactive ruin. The main character, Professor Larsen (Rolan Bykov), is a recipient of the Nobel Prize in Physics who lives in the basement of a decimated museum along with his sick wife Anna and several other museum employees. He compulsively composes mental and written letters to his son Eric, though he has no way of contacting him or even verifying that he is alive. Larsen believes the war has ended and that more surviving humans exist outside the central bunker, but nobody else believes his theories.

Larsen visits an orphanage, where the surviving children's current caretaker explains that she's thinking of evacuating to the central bunker; to Larsen's disapproval, she says that it is likely that the children will not be permitted to go with her because they have been traumatized into a state of catatonic withdrawal. Larsen learns that he too might be prohibited from entering the central bunker due to his old age. With Anna suffering from the effects of radiation sickness, Larsen sneaks past several military patrols during curfew hours in an attempt to find medicine. At the medical station, the doctor has no painkillers but gives Larsen a can of food in the hope that he can trade it for medication on the black market. The doctor then informs Larsen that the medical staff have been ordered to evacuate to the central bunker, where they and the other survivors will remain in perpetuity. Narrowly escaping a military raid as he barters with a privateer, Larsen returns to the museum with the painkillers only to find that Anna has died. The other museum employees bury her body.

In one of his letters to Eric, Larsen speculates, with the conviction of certainty, how the war started: a computer error triggers the first strike command. A military technician recognizes the error and has a chance to cancel the launch, but he's carrying a cup of coffee, which slows him down as he makes his way to the errant computer. He arrives too late by seven seconds; the war begins, and the operator hangs himself. The letter ends with Larsen wondering if "there is something in this number," seven, "even if we forget the commonplace things."

In a flashback, Larsen makes his way to the central bunker in an effort to find Eric shortly after the outbreak of the war. After sneaking into a medical facility, he enters the children's ward, where he is aghast to find all the children sick, traumatized, horribly injured, and screaming in agony.

In the present, Larsen is in the museum basement with the other survivors. A museum employee ruminates that human history has ended and that mankind itself was doomed from the start. The employee then lies down in a nearby grave and shoots himself dead as the others watch passively and his adult son slips into madness. Later, while salvaging books from a flooded library, Larsen talks with a man who responds to his hopefulness by saying that their situation is the fulfillment of biblical prophecy.

Larsen visits the orphanage, where he learns that the children will not be permitted to enter the central bunker. The caretaker and the remaining museum employees evacuate while Larsen decides to remain behind to look after the children alone. On Christmas Day, Larsen creates a makeshift Christmas tree out of sticks and candles while the children, who have begun to trust him, design Christmas ornaments with which to decorate it. In his final letter to Eric, Larsen writes that he has finally found purpose in life, and he implores his son not to leave him alone in the world.

The final scene is narrated by one of the children, who explains that Larsen died some time later. Convinced even on his deathbed that human life exists elsewhere, he told the children to leave the museum and seek other survivors while they still have the strength. The film ends with the children--now revealed to be eight in number--wandering through the apocalyptic landscape together, their fates unknown.

== Cast ==
- Rolan Bykov - Professor Larsen
- Vatslav Dvorzhetsky - Pastor
- Vera Mayorova - Anna
- Vadim Lobanov
- Viktor Mikhaylov
- Svetlana Smirnova - Theresa
- Vladimir Bessekernyh
- Vyacheslav Vasiliev - doctor dosimetrist
- Natalya Vlasova

== Themes ==
Due to the heated climate between North America and Russia during the events of The Cold War, many critics believe that Dead Man's Letters is a response to American films like The Day After and British films such as The War Game and Threads, discussing their perspective on the Nuclear Arms Race. TBS purchased the rights to show Dead Man's Letters, deciding to air it alongside Amerika, a twelve-hour ABC miniseries about what the United States would be like as a Soviet satellite state. The heavy reliance on themes like warfare, uncertainty, and grief as well as Americans involved in the war are interwoven through the production design from Yelena Amshinskaya and Viktor Ivanov. The use of defense equipment in the film, including gas masks and shelter equipment, makes its portrayal of a post-nuclear setting an eerie mirror image of the Soviet program.

== Production ==
Around the time the film started production, it was common knowledge that Russia had a strict censorship policy following the death of Stalin, resulting in a three year waiting period for Lopushansky and the crew consisting of various re-rewrites, possibly most likely due to Vyacheslav Rybakov's involvement with anti-Soviet literature and run-ins with the KGB. However, censorship started to loosen around the mid to late 80s towards discussing sensitive topics regarding current or previous events in Russia's history, so producers and film studios became more lenient with what was shown in cinemas. Gorbachev established a policy of allowing more open discussion of previously sensitive political issues making it possible for well connected civil defense skeptics to popularize their views. The patronage of Anatoly Gromyko-historian, member of the USSR Academy of Sciences, and son of Soviet foreign minister Andrei Gromyko enabled the production by Lenfilm in 1986 of the first portrayal of the aftermath of nuclear war in Soviet cinema.

Before production started on this film and his short Solo, Lopunshansky served as an apprentice for Tarkovsky and would later work as a production assistant for his 1979 film Stalker. Tarkovsky's teachings played a huge influence on Lopushansky's directing style as well as many aspects of the film from the set design, cinematography, and signature slow yet otherworldly pacing. In a 2017 interview with Indie Cinema, Lopunshansky states "I noticed that his lectures, in fact, are not about certain professional skills, but are more philosophical, about understanding the essence of art, its essence." This can be seen through the film's brutal realism and constant feelings of hopelessness and confusion, a sentiment shared with by various members of the crew. The use of monochrome coloring on the film stock gives a resemblance to the greenish tint seen in various scenes in Stalker, in order to give the film a more foreboding atmosphere.

Most of the filming was done in Kronstadt. Many episodes were filmed in there including the scene with a helicopter and the final scene in the desert.

== Reception ==
In 1989, The New York Times published a somewhat positive review of the film. Praising the film for its brutal realism and stunning set design, but found that the film was somewhat dismissed by its meandering in certain scenes stating "despite its technical virtues, seems just a bit too contrived to truly convince, much less to deeply move. Yet, in stripping the ideological gloss from the vision of ultimate calamity, Mr. Lopushinsky does succeed in creating a cultural artifact that makes the specter of the most dreadful possible event common to both sides of the superpower divide".

In USSR the film had an audience of more than 15 million people upon release. In Germany the distribution of the film was personally handled by Wim Wenders and in USA by Ted Turner.

== See also ==
- Vyacheslav Rybakov
- List of nuclear holocaust fiction
- Nuclear weapons in popular culture
