= The Ugly Swans (film) =

- Directed by: Konstantin Lopushansky
- Written by: Konstantin Lopushansky; Vyacheslav Rybakov; Arkady and Boris Strugatsky (novel)
- Produced by: Catherine Dussart; Dmitry Gerbachevsky; Andrey Sigle
- Starring: Catherine Dussart; Gregory Hlady
- Cinematography: Vladislav Gurtchin
- Edited by: Maxim Holodiuk; Sergei Obukhov; Aleksandr Zaretzky
- Music by: Andrey Sigle
- Distributed by: Proline Film
- Release date: October 19, 2006
- Running time: 105 minutes
- Country: Russia
- Language: Russian

The Ugly Swans (Russian: Гадкие лебеди) is a 2006 Russian science fiction drama film directed by Konstantin Lopushansky, based on the 1967 novel of the same name by Arkady and Boris Strugatsky. The film is often compared to Andrei Tarkovsky's Stalker, also adapted from a Strugatsky book.

== Plot ==
The film's plot is loosely based on the novel, with some superficial differences. The story has been adjusted slightly to contextualize it in the "near future," with the main character Victor Banev recast as a UN envoy to the town of Tashlinsk, where a mysterious group has taken the town's children to an isolated boarding school. The major departure from the novel's plot is in the ending, in which the "Aquatters" ("Slimeys" from the novel) are all killed by the humans. The children are heroically rescued by Banev, but they are unable to reassimilate into society and are institutionalized.

A small role created for the film was a UN negotiator named Gennady Komov, a reference to a popular character from the Strugatskys' other books.

== Awards ==
The film received the Best Score award at Kinotavr.
