= Konstantin Lopushansky =

Russian film director and author (born 1947)

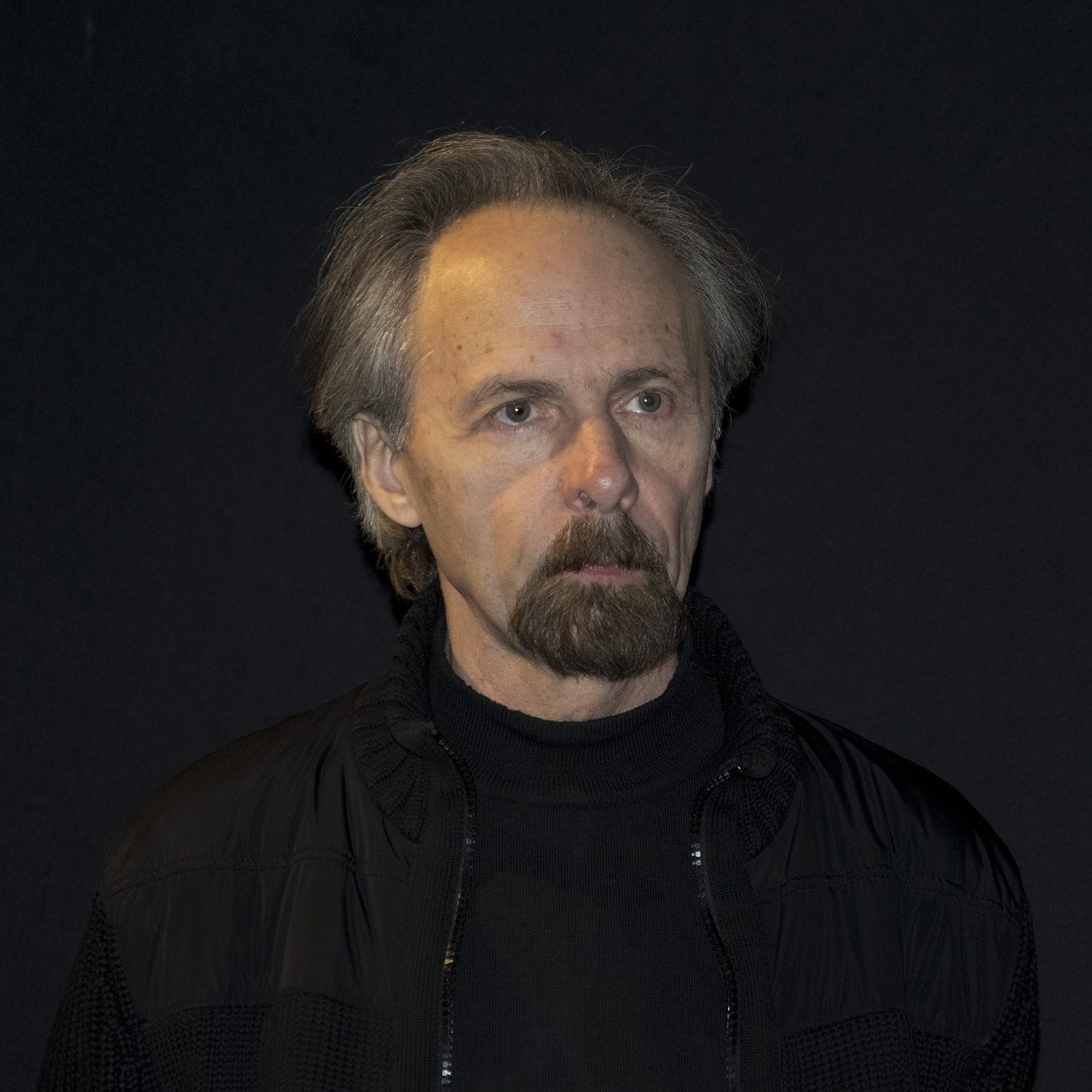
- Konstantin Lopushansky in 2017
- Born: Konstantin Sergeyevich Lopushansky; June 12, 1947 (age 79); Dnipropetrovsk, Ukrainian SSR, USSR
- Occupation: Film director
- Years active: 1978–present
- Awards: People's Artist of Russia

Konstantin Sergeyevich Lopushansky (Russian: Константин Сергеевич Лопушанский; born 12 June 1947) is a Soviet and Russian film director, film theorist, and author. He is best known for directing the apocalyptic and post-apocalyptic films Dead Man's Letters (1986), A Visitor to a Museum (1989), Russian Symphony (1994), and The Ugly Swans (2006).

In 1997, Lopushansky was awarded the honorary title of Honoured Artist of the Russian Federation. In 2007, he was awarded the title of People's Artist of Russia, the highest civilian honour in Russia for the performing arts.

== Biography ==
=== Early life ===
Konstantin Lopushansky was born on 12 June 1947 in Dnipropetrovsk, Ukrainian SSR, and was raised in Kazan. His mother, Sofia Petrovna Lopushanskaya, worked as a linguistics professor at Kazan State University and Volgograd State University. His father, Sergei Timofeyevich Lopushansky, was a front-line soldier who died in 1953 from wounds sustained during the war.

=== Education and early career ===
In 1970, Konstantin Lopushansky graduated from Kazan Conservatory as a violinist, and in 1973 he completed a postgraduate course at Leningrad Conservatory with a Ph.D. thesis in art criticism. Afterwards, Lopushansky taught at the Kazan and Leningrad conservatories for several years. Lopushansky took higher courses for scriptwriters and film directors from the director's department at the workshop of Emil Loteanu.

Upon graduating from the directorial courses in 1979, Lopushansky assisted Andrei Tarkovsky in directing the legendary film Stalker, based on the novel Roadside Picnic by Boris Strugatsky.

Lopushansky's thesis film Solo made in 1980 was about a musician playing his last concert during the Siege of Leningrad.

Since 1980 Lopushansky has worked as a production director at the Lenfilm cinema studio.

=== Dead Man's Letters and breakthrough ===
In 1986, Konstantin Lopushansky made his feature film directorial debut with the post-apocalyptic film Dead Man's Letters, which was co-written by Boris Strugatsky. It was screened at the International Critics' Week section of the Cannes Film Festival in 1987 and received the FIPRESCI prize at the 35th International Filmfestival Mannheim-Heidelberg.

Lopushanksy's 1989 film A Visitor to a Museum was entered into the 16th Moscow International Film Festival where it won the Silver St. George and the Prix of Ecumenical Jury.

Lopushansky's 1994 film Russian Symphony was screened in the Forum section of the 45th Berlin International Film Festival where it received the Prize of the Ecumenical Jury.

Lopushansky made the 2006 film The Ugly Swans, based on the novel by Arkady and Boris Strugatsky. The science-fiction film was about a writer who visits a boarding school for gifted children where the teachers are mutants.

Lopushansky's 2013 drama film The Role told the story of an actor who decides to impersonate a deceased commander of the Red Army. It was shown in competition at the 35th Moscow International Film Festival. It received the Nika Award for Best Screenplay.

Konstantin Lopushansky's drama film Through the Black Glass was released in 2019.

In February 2022 signed an open letter from the FilmUnion condemning Russia's military invasion of Ukraine.

== Filmography ==
Year	Film
1978	Tears in Windy Weather (Slyozy v vetrenuyu pogodu) (short film)
1980	Solo (short film)
1986	Dead Man's Letters (Pisma myortvogo cheloveka)
1989	A Visitor to a Museum (Posetitel muzeya)
1994	Russian Symphony (Russkaya simfoniya)
2001	The Turn of the Century (Konets veka)
2006	The Ugly Swans (Gadkie lebedi)
2013	The Role (Rol)
2019	Through the Black Glass (Skvoz chornoye steklo)
