= Yuri Arabov =

Russian screenwriter, writer, poet and educator (1954–2023)

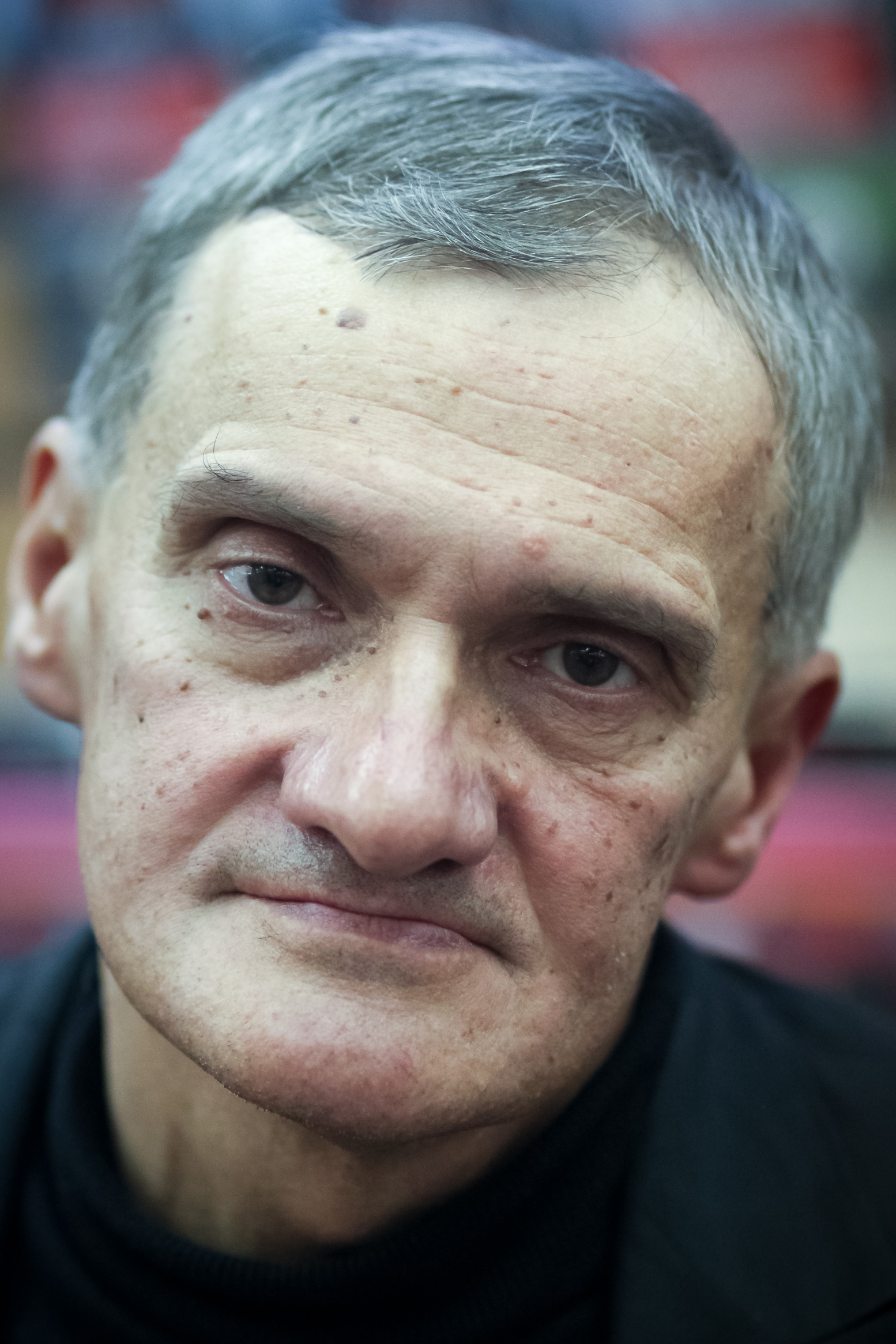
- Born: Yuri Nikolaevich Arabov; 25 October 1954; Moscow, Russian SFSR, USSR
- Died: 27 December 2023 (aged 69); Moscow, Russia
- Occupations: Screenwriter, writer
- Years active: 1978–2023

Yuri Nikolaevich Arabov (Russian: Юрий Николаевич Арабов; 25 October 1954 – 27 December 2023) was a Russian screenwriter, writer, poet and educator. He was known for his long-lasting collaboration with Alexander Sokurov. He was an Honored Artist of the Russian Federation (1999).

== Biography ==
Yuri Arabov was born in Moscow into a mixed Russian-Jewish family. His parents met in Tula, Russia, the native town of his father, but divorced five years after Yuri's birth. He was raised by his mother, Maria Sauts from Feodosia, Crimea. In 1937 she moved to Moscow to study directing at VGIK under Sergei Eisenstein, and later worked at the Gorky Film Studio as an assistant director and a dubbing director.

As a child Yuri took part in film dubbing. After school he considered becoming an Orthodox priest, but then decided to follow in his mother's footsteps and entered screenwriting courses at VGIK led by Nikolai Figurovsky which he finished in 1980. During the studies he met Alexander Sokurov who became his close friend and a regular collaborator ever afterwards. By 2017 they had produced 12 feature films together. Their first movie — The Lonely Voice of Man — was finished in 1978. Despite Andrei Tarkovsky's approval, it was called "a propaganda of Russian idealism" and banned for nine years, released only in 1987.

The same happened to their next film Mournful Unconcern: finished in 1983, it was released only in 1987. It was also nominated for the Golden Bear at the 37th Berlin International Film Festival. After that Sokurov and Arabov produced a lot of critically acclaimed movies, most famous of them being the so-called "tetralogy of power" which includes Moloch (1999), Taurus (2001), The Sun (2005) and Faust (2011), a film that won the Golden Lion at the 68th Venice International Film Festival.

For his work on Moloch Yuri received the Best Screenplay Award at the 1999 Cannes Film Festival and the Best Script award at the 1999 Russian Guild of Film Critics Awards. His screenplay for Taurus was also distinguished by the Best Script award at the 2001 Russian Guild of Film Critics Awards and the 2002 Nika Award. He also received Nika Awards for both The Sun and Faust, as well as A Room and a Half — a semi-biographical film about Joseph Brodsky directed and co-written by Andrei Khrzhanovsky in 2009.

Arabov created over 30 screenplays for both feature films and TV series. Besides Sokurov, he often worked with Aleksandr Proshkin and his son Andrei Proshkin, both prominent Russian film directors. He was a member of the Union of Cinematographers of the Russian Federation. Beginning in 1992 he was also working as an educator at VGIK where he served as the head of the Screenwriting Faculty until his death.

Arabov was the author of several novels, including Big-Beat (2003), Wonder (2009), Orlean (2011) and A Butterfly Encounter (2014), as well as a number of poetry books.

Arabov died on 27 December 2023, at the age of 69.

== Filmography ==
=== Films ===
- 1978 – The Lonely Voice of Man
- 1983 – Mournful Unconcern
- 1988 – Days of Eclipse
- 1988 – Mister Designer
- 1989 – The Devoted
- 1989 – Save and Protect
- 1990 – The Second Circle
- 1990 – The Sphinx
- 1992 – Presence
- 1992 – Stone
- 1994 – Whispering Pages
- 1997 – Mother and Son
- 1999 – Moloch
- 2001 – Taurus
- 2002 – Modern Game
- 2002 – A Cat and a Half
- 2004 – Apocrypha : Music for Peter and Paul
- 2005 – The Sun
- 2006 – Horror which is always with you
- 2008 – Yuri's Day
- 2009 – The Miracle
- 2009 – A Room and a Half
- 2011 – Faust
- 2012 – The Horde
- 2013 – Mirrors
- 2015 – Orlean
- 2015 – The Cage
- 2015 – The Guards
- 2016 – The Monk and the Demon
- 2020 – The Nose or the Conspiracy of Mavericks

=== Television ===
- 1990 – Nikolai Vavilov, 6 episodes
- 2005 – Doctor Zhivago, 11 episodes
- 2005 – The Case of "Dead Souls", 8 episodes
- 2007 – Lenin's Testament, 12 episodes

== Bibliography ==
- 2003 – Big-Beat — Moscow: Andrew's Flag, 400 pages. ISBN 5-9553-0024-4
- 2009 – Wonder — Moscow: AST, 224 pages. ISBN 978-5-271-22128-6
- 2011 – Orlean — Moscow: AST, 224 pages. ISBN 978-5-17-072648-6
- 2014 – A Butterfly Encounter — Moscow: AST, 352 pages. ISBN 978-5-17-085777-7
