= Family Name =

Family Name or Family name may refer to:

== Name ==
- Surname, the portion of a personal name that indicates family, tribe or community
- Clan name (disambiguation), applied differently in several cultures

== Other uses ==
- Family Name (film), a 2006 Russian-Kazakh drama film
- Family Name (horse), 1974 winner of the Miss Woodford Stakes
- "Family Name", a song by Prince from the 2001 album The Rainbow Children

== See also ==
- List of family name affixes
