= Alexey Neymyshev =

Russian producer, actor, musician, actor and athlete

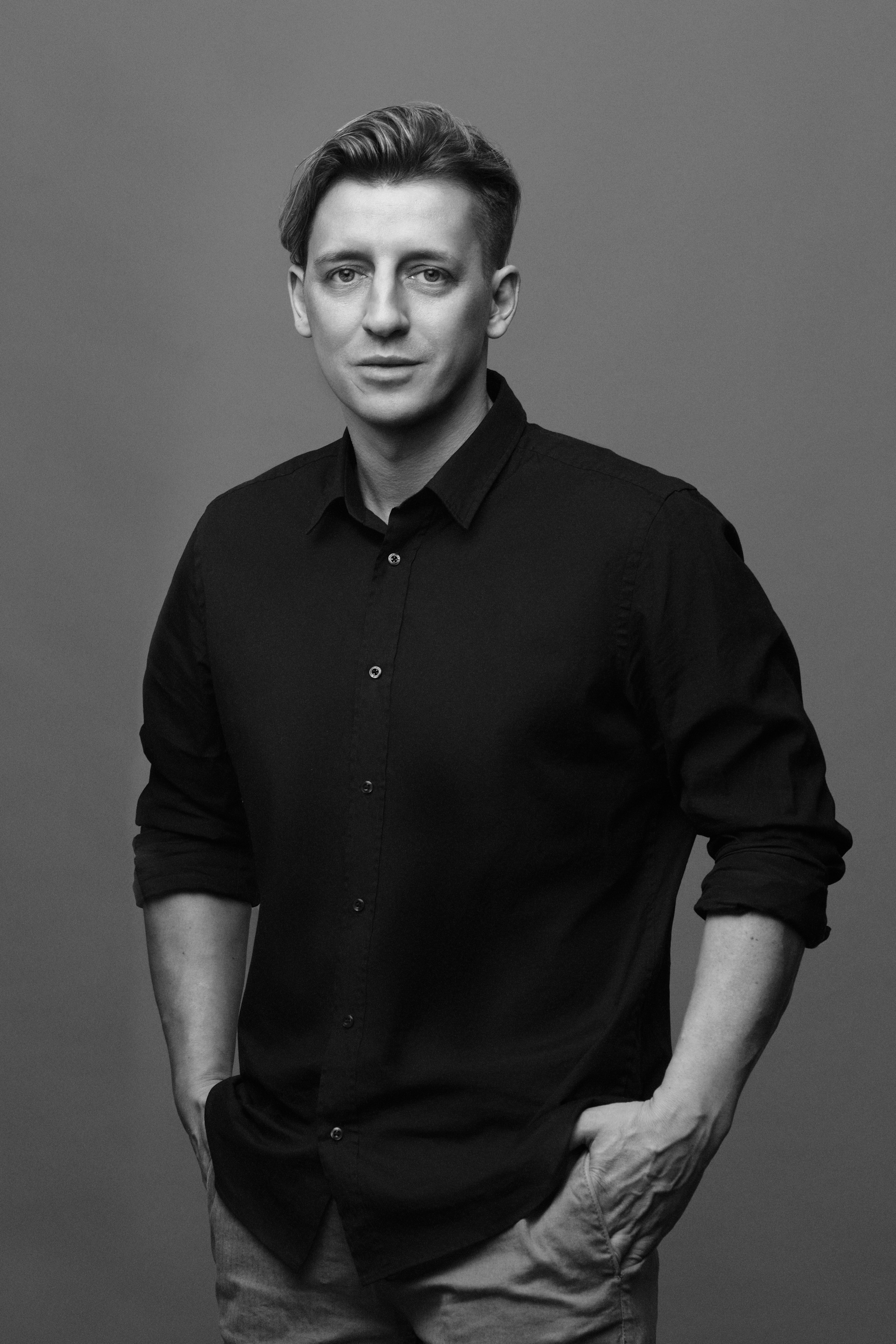
- Alexey Neymyshev in 2021
- Born: March 11, 1982 (age 44); Leningrad, USSR
- Occupations: Actor; director; producer; entrepreneur
- Awards: Nikolai Ovsyannikov Creative Support Prize for Best Debut (2003)

Alexey Pavlovich Neymyshev (Russian: Алексе́й Па́влович Не́ймышев; born March 11, 1982, Leningrad, USSR) is a Russian actor, producer, musician, entrepreneur, and athlete. He has appeared in films Father and Son, Alexandra, and Faust. Neymyshev is the founder of the Alexander Foundation and the company Neymaxx Multimedia. He has produced over ten films.

== Early life and education ==
Alexey Neymyshev was born in Leningrad in 1982 into a military family. In the late 1980s, his family moved to Kamyshin. In 1999, he graduated from the Kamyshin 4th secondary school and, in 2000, enrolled in the military institute of Physical Culture in St. Petersburg. Four years later, he transferred to the P.F. Lesgaft National State University of Physical Education, Sport and Health. In 2010, he graduated with honors from the master's program "Entrepreneurship and Company Management" (MBA) at the Russian Presidential Academy of National Economy and Public Administration.

== Sports career ==
Neymyshev began playing football at the age of seven with his local team, Sokol. In 1998, he debuted with the main team squad of Rotor Kamyshin. He won the Volgograd Oblast Football Championship multiple times and was named the best player in various Russian Youth League tournaments. From 2001 to 2005, he was part of the football system of FC Zenit Saint Petersburg.

== Film career ==
In 2003, while still a cadet at the military institute of Physical Culture, Alexey Neymyshev played the main role in the film Father and Son directed by Alexander Sokurov. The film premiered on May 23, 2003, at the 56th Cannes Film Festival, where it was awarded the prize of the International Federation of Film Critics. The movie received positive reviews from critics. Andrey Plakhov noted in the journal Iskusstvo Kino:

"None of Sokurov's Cannes screenings over the years have been failures. Similarly, "Father and Son" stirred concern, perhaps bewilderment, but did not leave anyone indifferent; instead, it intrigued. Through the blurred plot, the non-actorly plasticity of the characters, and the strained dialogues, the tension of human flesh, the nervous interplay of colors and shades, the music of unclear emotions, and the yearning of inarticulateness broke through."

Some critics particularly emphasized that the main roles in the film were played by non-professional actors:

"Non-professional actors were cast for the main roles. While Alexey Neymyshev as the Son is more or less organic, Andrey Shetinin as the Father looks absolutely helpless."

Sokurov explained the casting choices:

"The behavior of the characters here should be human instead of theatrical. The Father’s life is 'lived' on screen by Andrei Shchetinin, a producer of cultural programs. The Son is played by Alexey Neymyshev, who is indeed a cadet at one of the military institutes. By the way, I want to express my deep gratitude for all the comprehensive assistance during filming provided by the head of that institute, Major General Alexander Vladimirovich Levshin. Overall, I am pleased with the result."

Subsequently, Alexey Neymyshev appeared in other films by Sokurov, including Alexandra and Faust. In 2009, he participated in the documentary project Reading the Blockade Book (his son, Lev Neymyshev, also took part in the project). In 2019, he played the main role in the short film Elizium. The film's director, Gia Kereselidze, described Neymyshev :

"Or take Alexey Neymyshev, who starred in the film Elizium. He's not an actor either (although he previously appeared in three films by Alexander Sokurov), but we immediately felt we were on the same wavelength. Alexey approached the filming quite professionally: for example, he had to lie in milk for seven hours, and while the milk was warm at first, it cooled down later, but he didn't complain."

== Producer ==
Alexey Neymyshev has produced over ten films. A significant milestone in his career was the restoration and theatrical release of Alexander Sokurov's film And Nothing More (Allies). Doctor of Historical Sciences and chief researcher at the St. Petersburg Institute of History of the Russian Academy of Sciences, Yulia Kantor, noted:

"He took the film, which was shot in 1985 at the Leningrad Documentary Film Studio and rejected by Soviet censorship, off the shelf on the eve of Victory Day so that a 'non-random audience' would come to the theater. In fact, despite being rich with unique archival footage, it's hard to call this film a documentary: it is entirely an author's work, distinctly subjective. It is the reflection of a concerned intellectual. For viewers following Sokurov's work, this premiere — delayed by a quarter-century — is fascinating for 'rewinding' the 'chronicle' of his reflections in reverse. Thus, it becomes clear how Taurus, Moloch, and The Sun were conceived and what they originated from. This film has a lot of music, minimal words, and faces, faces, faces."

== Alexander Foundation ==
In 2011, Alexey Neymyshev founded the Alexander Foundation for the Support of Culture, Art, and Education. Through this foundation, several projects have been realized, including: The nationwide competition for young artists' projects, Nova Art; Archaeological excavations in Iraq, involving the Institute of Archaeology of the Russian Academy of Sciences, the Institute of Oriental Manuscripts of the Russian Academy of Sciences, the Institute of Oriental Studies of the Russian Academy of Sciences, the Pushkin State Museum of Fine Arts, and other leading organizations; Restoration of films by Alexander Sokurov.

== Entrepreneurial activities ==
In 2010, Alexey Neymyshev founded the multimedia solutions company Neymaxx Multimedia. As of early 2024, Neymaxx Multimedia and the Alexander Foundation had produced several films: Dynamo Leningrad, River of Memory, L@boutins in Galoshes, or an Adult Startup, A Groom for Grandma, and Donum. Multiple films are currently in production: Ernest, Deborah Turbeville — My Russian Soul, and Ether. The company is also partnering with Olympus Film Studio on the making of Zhiga film. In 2023, Neymyshev received the "Svoi Lyudi" (Our People) recognition award, which honors outstanding individuals for their contributions to business development in St. Petersburg and Russia.

== Personal life ==
Alexey Neymyshev is married to the grandniece of Egyptian actor Omar Sharif, a two-time Golden Globe winner. The couple has two children.

== Filmography ==
=== Actor ===
1. 2003 — Father and Son — Alexey
2. 2007 — Alexandra — Officer
3. 2011 — Faust — Student
4. 2019 – Elizium – Main Role

=== Producer ===
1. 2012 – 1812 (Director: Ella Omelchenko)
2. 2013 — Military Themes in the Films of Alexander Sokurov (Director: Alexey Yankovsky)
3. 2013 — And Nothing More (Allies) (Director: Alexander Sokurov)[Comment 1]
4. 2013 – Romance about Elizabeth (Director: Ella Omelchenko)
5. 2018 — Stalingrad. Are We Still Alive or Not? (Director: Alexey Yankovsky)
6. 2019 — Rose (Director: Gia Kereselidze)
7. 2019 — Elizium (Director: Gia Kereselidze)
8. 2020 — The Roof (Director: Alexander Razbash)
9. 2021 — River of Memory (Director: Alexander Udaltsev)
10. 2022 — L@boutins in Galoshes or an Adult Startup (Director: Alexander Razbash)
11. 2022 — A Groom for Grandma (Director: Alexander Razbash)
12. 2022 — Dynamo Leningrad (Director: Boris Samokhvalov)
13. 2022 — DONUM (Director: Anastasia Petrochuk)
14. 2024 — Les rêves (Dreams) (Director: Maria Baeva)

=== Director ===
1. 2019 — Pavlovsk
2. 2025 — Efir

== Awards and nominations ==
Nikolai Ovsyannikov Creative Support Prize for Best Debut — at the 11th International Film Festival "Festival of Festivals" (2003).

== Notes ==
=== Comments ===
The film was shot in 1985 but was restored and released in theaters in 2013.
