= Take =

Single continuous recorded performance

A take is a single continuous recorded performance. The term is used in film and music to denote and track the stages of production.

== Film ==
In cinematography, a take refers to each filmed "version" of a particular shot or "setup". Takes of each shot are generally numbered starting with "take one" and the number of each successive take is increased (with the director calling for "take two" or "take eighteen") until the filming of the shot is completed.

Film takes are often designated with the aid of a clapperboard. It is also referred to as the slate. The number of each take is written or attached to the clapperboard, which is filmed briefly prior to or at the beginning of the actual take.

Only those takes which are vetted by the continuity person and/or script supervisor are printed and sent to the film editor.

=== Single-takes ===
A single-take or one-take occurs when the entire scene is shot the first time satisfactorily, whether by necessity (as with certain expensive special effects) or by some combination of luck and skill.

=== Long takes ===
Some film directors are known for using very long, unedited takes. Alfred Hitchcock's Rope is famous for being composed of eleven takes, each from two to ten minutes long. Half of the film's cuts are only to account for technological limitations, as film canisters can only record so much, and so the camera pans to a blank surface, like a wall or the back of a jacket, and they discretely cut to the next take. This required actors to step over cables and dolly tracks while filming, and stagehands to move furniture and props out of the camera's way as it moved around the room. The eight-minute opening shot of The Player includes people discussing long takes in other movies.

Aleksandr Sokurov's Russian Ark (2002) consists of a single 90-minute take, shot on a digital format. Mike Figgis' Timecode (2000) consists of a single 90-minute take as well, albeit with four camera units shooting simultaneously. In the finished film, all four camera angles are shown simultaneously on a split screen, with the sound fading from one to another to direct audience attention.

=== Multiple takes ===
Other directors such as Stanley Kubrick are notorious for demanding numerous retakes of a single scene, once asking Shelley Duvall to repeat a scene 127 times for The Shining. During the shooting of Eyes Wide Shut, Kubrick asked for 97 takes of Tom Cruise walking through a door before he was satisfied. Charlie Chaplin, both director and star of The Gold Rush, did 63 separate takes of a scene where his character eats a boot—in reality, a prop made of licorice—and ended up being taken to the hospital for insulin shock due to the high sugar intake. Chaplin also did 342 takes of a scene in City Lights (1931).

In other cases, it is the actors who cause multiple takes. One fight scene in Jackie Chan's The Young Master was so intricate that it required 329 takes to complete.

Director Bryan Singer tried for a full day to get his desired shots of the cast of The Usual Suspects behaving sullenly in a police lineup, but the actors could not remain serious and kept spoiling the takes by laughing and making faces. In the end, Singer changed his plan and used the funniest of the takes in the final movie to illustrate the contempt the criminals had for the police.

During the filming of Some Like It Hot, director Billy Wilder was notoriously frustrated by the retakes required by Marilyn Monroe's inability to remember her lines.

== Music recording ==
In music recording, a take similarly refers to successive attempts to record a song or part. Musical takes are also sequentially numbered. The need to obtain a complete, acceptable take was especially important in the years predating multi-track recording and overdubbing techniques.

Failed attempts are called "false starts" if, for example, not even a complete chorus or verse is recorded; longer almost-complete attempts are called "long false starts".

Different versions of the same song from a single recording session are sometimes eventually released as alternate takes (or alternative takes) or "playback masters" of the recording. Notable examples of releases of alternate takes include The Beatles Anthology box set, Johnny Cash's Bear Family box sets and Johnny Cash:The Outtakes and a series of alternate takes of recordings by Elvis Presley released by RCA Victor beginning in 1974 with Elvis: A Legendary Performer Volume 1.

An example of the musical implications of multiple recorded performances and how they differ can be found on the posthumous 1969 LP compilation "To Know a Man" (Blue Horizon 7-66230) which comprises the complete last two early 1960s sessions by legendary slide guitarist Elmore James with backing musicians. These are unedited studio tapes which include multiple live complete and part takes of several tracks. There are also adlib band reminiscences and talkback chat since the takes are continuous.
