= Faust (2011 film) =

- Directed by: Alexander Sokurov
- Written by: Yuri Arabov
- Screenplay by: Yuri Arabov; Marina Koreneva (copy editor in German); Alexander Sokurov
- Based on: Faust by Johann Wolfgang von Goethe Doctor Faustus by Thomas Mann
- Produced by: Andrey Sigle
- Starring: Johannes Zeiler; Anton Adasinsky; Isolda Dychauk; Hanna Schygulla
- Cinematography: Bruno Delbonnel
- Edited by: Jörg Hauschild
- Music by: Andrey Sigle
- Production company: Proline Film
- Release date: 8 September 2011 (Venice Film Festival)
- Running time: 134 minutes
- Country: Russia
- Language: German
- Budget: € 8 million
- Box office: $2,121,258

Faust (Russian: Фауст) is a 2011 Russian film directed by Alexander Sokurov. Set in the 19th century, it is a free interpretation of the Faust legend and its respective literary adaptations by both Johann Wolfgang von Goethe (1808) as well as Thomas Mann. The dialogue is in German. The film won the Golden Lion at the 68th Venice International Film Festival. At the 2012 Russian Guild of Film Critics Awards the film was awarded the prizes for Best Film, Best Director (Alexander Sokurov), Best Script (Yuri Arabov) and Best Male Supporting Actor (Anton Adasinsky). It received generally positive reviews from critics.

== Plot ==
Driven by an insatiable thirst for enlightenment, Heinrich Faust (Johannes Zeiler) seeks to uncover the hidden mechanisms of existence. His obsession with the "burning desire for cognition" is so profound that he literally dissects the dead in a desperate search for the soul's location. While Faust clings to the biblical proverb "In the beginning was the word," he is challenged by the moneylender Mauricius (Anton Adassinsky)—a grotesque, worldly incarnation of Mephistopheles—who counters: "In the beginning was the deed.

Despite his own physical deformity, Mauricius views himself as an Übermensch, guiding Faust through the dark underbelly of their town. Their journey leads to a bathhouse where Faust becomes captivated by the youthful Margarete (Gretchen). Following a pub brawl in which Faust kills Gretchen’s brother, Valentin—orchestrated by Mauricius.

Faust’s interest turns into a dangerous obsession. He rationalizes his lust as scientific inquiry, convinced that studying Gretchen will reveal the boundary between life and death. Ultimately, Faust signs a blood contract, bartering his soul for a single night with her. Now living on borrowed time, Faust can pursue Gretchen, but he is haunted by penitence and fear. Finally Faust cannot bear Mauricius' nihilistic comments anymore. Overwhelmed with wrath, he buries Mauricius under rocks and finds himself lost in the middle of nowhere.

== Cast ==
- Johannes Zeiler as Faust
- Anton Adasinsky as Moneylender (Mephistopheles)
- Isolda Dychauk as Margarete (Gretchen)
- Georg Friedrich as Wagner
- Hanna Schygulla as the Moneylender's 'wife'
- Lars Rudolph as Innkeeper
- Antje Lewald as Margarete's mother
- Florian Brueckner as Valentin, Margarete's brother
- Sigurdur Skulasson as Faust's father
- Maxim Mehmet as Valentin's friend
- Eva-Maria Kurz as Faust's cook

== Themes ==
The film is the final part in a series of films where Alexander Sokurov explores the corrupting effects of power. The previous installments are three biographical dramas: about Adolf Hitler in Moloch from 1999, Vladimir Lenin in Taurus from 2001, and the Japanese emperor Hirohito in The Sun from 2005. Producer Andrey Sigle said about Faust: "The film has no particular relevance to contemporary events in the world – it is set in the early 19th century – but reflects Sokurov's enduring attempts to understand man and his inner forces." Beyond the themes within the actual film, the project also had a political dimension. Sigle said: "The film is a big Russian cultural project and for Putin is very important. He saw it as a film that can introduce the Russian mentality into European culture; to promote integration between Russian and European culture."

== Production ==
The project, described in 2005 as "loosely based on works by Goethe and Thomas Mann", was announced by Sokurov in 2005 as "a very colourful, elegant picture with a lot of Strauss music and a smell of chocolate." The eight-million euro film was produced by the St. Petersburg-based company Proline Film and received support from the Mass Media Support Fund of Russia.

Filming started 17 August 2009 in the Czech Republic, where it continued for two months. Locations included the castles of Točník, Lipnice nad Sázavou and Ledeč, as well as the town Kutná Hora. Studio scenes were shot at Barrandov Studios in Prague. Photography also took place in Germany. In October the team moved to Iceland for several days of filming resulting in some astonishing shots of geysers.

== Release ==
The film premiered on 8 September 2011 in competition at the 68th Venice International Film Festival. Three days later it was screened in the Masters section of the 2011 Toronto International Film Festival.

== Reception ==
=== Critical response ===
Faust has an approval rating of 66% on review aggregator website Rotten Tomatoes, based on 38 reviews, and an average rating of 6.60/10. The website's critical consensus states, "It strays from the source, but whatever it might lack in fidelity, Aleksandr Sokurov's lengthy, ambitious Faust more than makes up in fresh energy and ideas". It also has a score of 65 out of 100 on Metacritic, based on 16 critics, indicating "generally favorable reviews".

Jay Weissberg wrote in Variety: "Forget Marlowe, Goethe, Gounod and Murnau, or rather, lay them aside, since the idiosyncratic helmer adds his own spin on the classic legend, and an over-familiarity with Faust's previous incarnations will likely hinder understanding." In a reservation, Weissberg wrote that Sokurov's "established fans" will be "the only audience for this largely impenetrable though undeniably impressive indulgence". Regarding the visuals, he noted the unexpected collaboration between the cinematographer Bruno Delbonnel and Sokurov, and wrote: "[W]hile the stillness that marks the first films of his quartet (self-lensed) is little in evidence, visuals here are striking in their mottled gray tonalities. ... The influence of Flemish and Dutch painting on Sokurov's work has never been clearer than in Faust, with its deep debt to the witchcraft paintings of artists such as David Teniers and Herri met de Bles."

Manohla Dargis of The New York Times wrote: "...and bliss out the next on the delirium that is "Faust," the latest from Alexander Sokurov ("Russian Ark"). An eccentric interpretation of the Goethe play, "Faust" is mesmerizing, at times predictably if divertingly bewildering and beautiful, with images that burn into your memory, like that of an embracing couple falling into a lake in a vision of desire and the abyss that invokes "L'Atalante" but is definitely Sokurovian."

At the closing ceremony of the Venice Film Festival, Faust was honoured with the festival's highest prize, the Golden Lion. The jury president was the American filmmaker Darren Aronofsky, who said when he presented the winner: "There are some films that make you cry, there are some films that make you laugh, there are some films that change you forever after you see them; and this is one of them."

=== Awards and nominations ===
Faust won highest prize 68th Venice International Film Festival for Best Film, the Golden Lion.
