= Mournful Unconcern =

- Directed by: Alexander Sokurov
- Written by: Yuri Arabov
- Starring: Ramaz Chkhikvadze; Alla Osipenko; Vladimir Zamanskiy; Tatyana Yegorova; Viktoria Amitova; Irina Sokolova; Dmitriy Bryantsev; Vadim Zhuk; Ilya Rivin; Andrei Reshetin; Vladimir Dmitriev
- Cinematography: Sergey Yurizditsky
- Edited by: Leda Semyonova
- Music by: Vladimir Persov
- Distributed by: Lenfilm
- Release date: 1987
- Running time: 110 minutes
- Country: Soviet Union
- Language: Russian

Mournful Unconcern (Russian: Скорбное бесчувствие, translit. Skorbnoye beschuvstviye) is the third produced film by Alexander Sokurov, completed in 1983, but the fourth released one, as it was banned by Soviet authorities until perestroika in 1987. The film, set during World War I, is inspired by Bernard Shaw's play Heartbreak House. Professional actors (Zamansky, Osipenko, Sokolova and others) were used alongside amateur actors, like in most early Sokurov films, and many of the trademarks of his cinematographic style were already apparent.

== Plot ==
Family and friends gather in a decadent house to party. Despite their delusive distinction a raw passion for sex and violence comes to light.

== Background ==
The film sparked controversy and was halted by the Soviet film authorities by cutting state subsidy for the film's budget during the production process, so it took time to find money and complete the film. It was nominated for the Golden Bear at the 37th Berlin International Film Festival in 1987.

== Cast ==
- Ramaz Chkhikvadze as Captain Shotover
- Alla Osipenko as Ariadna
- Irina Sokolova as Nanny Guinness
- Tatyana Yegorova as Gessiona
- Vladimir Zamansky as Madzini
- Viktoria Amitova as Ellie (uncredited)
- Dmitri Bryantsev as Hector (uncredited)
