= Alla Osipenko =

Soviet ballerina (1932–2025)

- Алла Осипенко
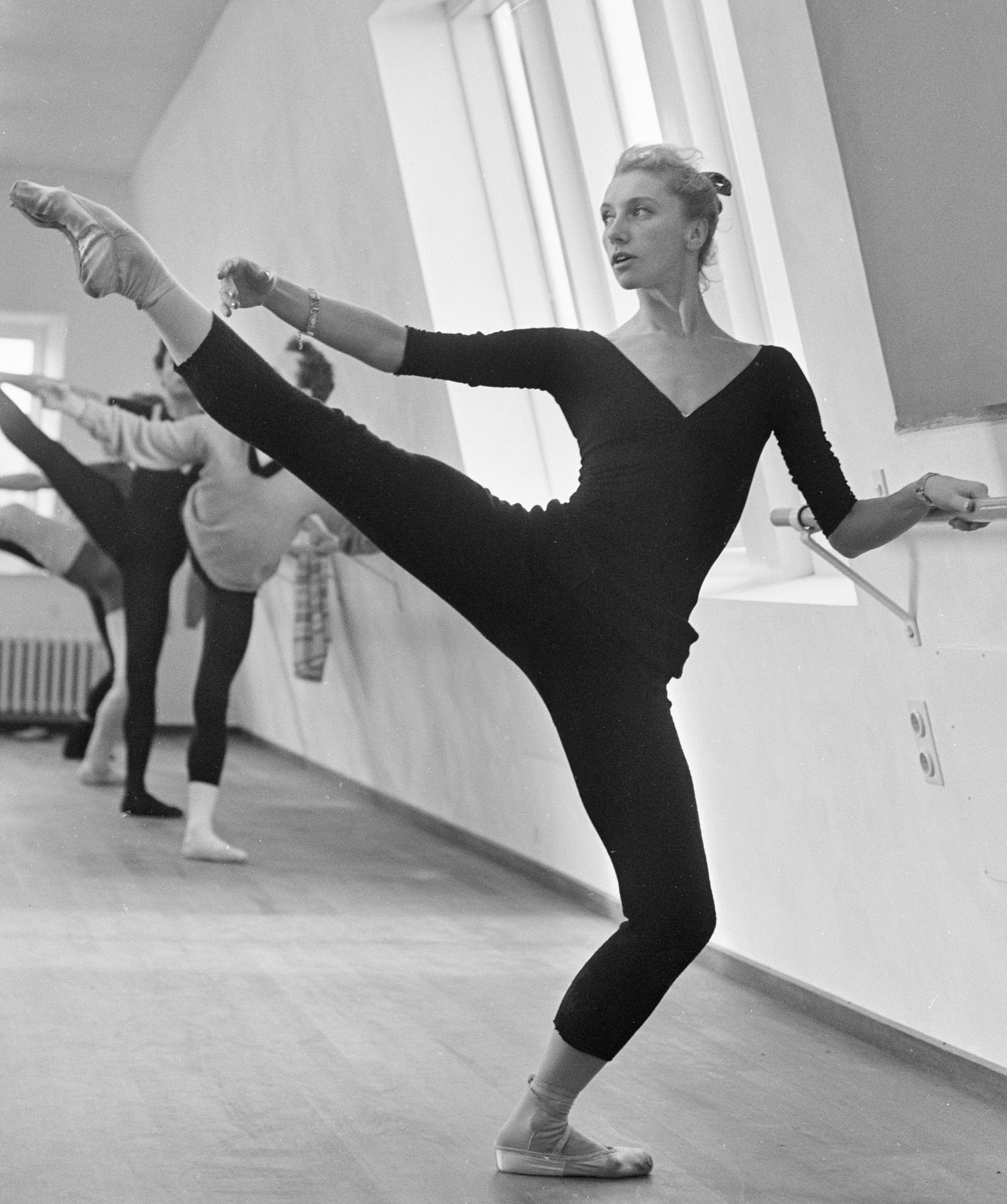
- Osipenko in the Netherlands in 1968
- Born: Alla Yevgenyevna Osipenko; 16 June 1932; Leningrad, Russian SFSR, USSR
- Died: 12 May 2025 (aged 92); Saint Petersburg, Russia
- Education: Leningrad Choreographic School
- Occupations: Ballet dancer; ballet teacher
- Spouse(s): Georgi Paysist; Anatoly Nisnevich; Gennady Voropayev; John Markovsky
- Children: 1
- Awards: Pavlova Prize; People's Artist of the Soviet Union
- Career
- Former groups: Kirov Ballet; Yacobson Ballet; Ballet of Boris Eifman; Hartford Ballet; Mikhailovsky Ballet

Alla Yevgenyevna Osipenko (Russian: Алла Евгеньевна Осипенко; 16 June 1932 – 12 May 2025) was a Soviet ballerina and ballet teacher. One of the last pupils of Agrippina Vaganova, Osipenko became a prima ballerina of the Kirov Ballet in Leningrad in 1954. She danced both classical ballets including Swan Lake and new creations such as the 1957 The Stone Flower, and was the preferred partner on stage of Mikhail Baryshnikov, Rudolf Nureyev and Yuri Soloviev. After Nureyev defected to the West in 1961 while on a tour with the company including her, she was blocked from international touring. She left the Kirov in 1971, first dancing in Leningrad with the Yacobson Ballet until 1973, and then with the company of Boris Eifman as the first star to promote his work.

After the dissolution of the Soviet Union, she moved to the United States in 1995, working as a ballet coach with the Hartford Ballet in Connecticut. She returned to her hometown (now again Saint Petersburg) in 2000 where she coached the Mikhailovsky Ballet. She was regarded as "one of the most expressive ballerinas of her generation".

== Life and career ==
Osipenko was born in Leningrad on 16 June 1932, to an aristocratic family. to Nina Borovikovskaya and Evgeni Borovikovsky. Her father worked as a police detective and her mother as a typist. Her father was arrested in 1937 for a drunken rant against the Soviet state. He was sentenced to five years in prison, and the parents divorced. She was accepted in 1941 to study ballet at the Leningrad Choreographic School (now Vaganova Academy) in the class of Agrippina Vaganova. When Nazi forces invaded that year, the school was evacuated to Perm, returned to Leningrad in 1944, after the blockade of the city ended. While still a student, she performed with two others in a piece that Vakhtang Chabukiani, beginning collaboration with contemporary choreographers. Leonid Yakobson created a pas de deux in which she performed the woman's part.

=== Kirov Ballet ===
Upon graduation, she joined the Kirov Ballet (now the Mariinsky Ballet) in 1950. Her first major role was the Lilac Fairy in The Sleeping Beauty in 1952, choreographed by Konstantin Sergeyev. She was promoted to prima ballerina in 1954. Osipenko appeared as Odette-Odile in Swan Lake, Gamzatti in La Bayadère, Waltz and Mazurka in Chopiniana, Masha in The Nutcracker, Frigia in Spartak. She was the preferred partner on stage of Mikhail Baryshnikov, Rudolf Nureyev and Yuri Soloviev.

Osipenko appeared in Paris in 1956 with the Stanislavsky-Nemirovich Danchenko troupe and was awarded the city’s Pavlova Prize, as one of the first new Kirov stars seen in Western Europe. In 1957 she created the role of the Mistress of the Copper Mountain in Prokofiev's The Stone Flower, choreographed by Yury Grigorovich. Her costume of a figure-revealing unitard created a sensation. She performed Mekhmene-Banu in The Legend of Love in 1961.

In 1961 she participated in the first tour of the Kirov troupe to Paris and London, dancing in the classical Swan Lake and La Bayadère and in The Stone Flower. Nureyev defected to the West a day after starring with her in Swan Lake. Upon her return to the Soviet Union, she was under considerable suspicion by the KGB. She declined an invitation to join the Communist Party, and disliked being lectured by party members because of an affair in Paris with dancer Attilio Labis while being married to Anatoly Nisnevich, a Kirov dancer. She defended Nurejev in a trial in his absence. Osipenko was not taken on the Kirov tour to the Metropolitan Opera the same year nor following international tours. She had a rocky relationship with the Kirov for much of the 1960s. In 1970 she stepped in for a tour to London where she triumphed again.

=== Yacobson Ballet and Boris Eifman ballet ===
Osipenko left the Kirov in 1971. She danced as a soloist of the troupe Choreographic Miniatures directed by Yakobson in Leningrad until 1973. She also danced leading parts of classic and modern repertoire in stagings of well-known Soviet ballet-masters. Osipenko then joined the company of Leningrad choreographer Boris Eifman, becoming the first star dancer to champion his work. Both troupes were experimental, with a free aesthetic. Gennady Smakov, a culture critic, noted in his 1984 book The Great Russian Dancers that "the more abstract the choreography, the more the various facets of her personality broke through it". In Eifman's 1978 Two Voices, she danced with John Markovsky a duet to music by Pink Floyd. Further performances were in Interrupted Song, The Firebird, and Idiot. Her final ballet in 1981 was Requiem. Violette Verdy, a leading dancer for George Balanchine, said that Osipenko employed "the classical technique in a completely personal way to create shapes and emotions that one didn’t expect."

=== Teaching ===
After the dissolution of the Soviet Union, Osipenko moved to the United States in 1995 and worked with the Hartford Ballet, both company and school, in Connecticut. She returned to her home town, now called again Saint Petersburg, in 2000, motivated in part by wanting to live close to her grandson. She had a longtime artistic relationship with the famed Russian filmmaker Aleksandr Sokurov and appeared in a number of his films including the award-winning international success, Russian Ark. Osipenko worked as a ballet coach with the Mikhailovsky Ballet in Saint Petersburg.

=== Personal life and death ===
Osipenko was married four times, all four marriages ended in divorce. Her first husband was art student Georgi Paysist, her second husband was Kirov dancer Anatoly Nisnevich. Her third husband was actor Gennady Voropayev; the marriage produced one child. Her fourth husband was John Markovsky, a former Kirov dancer who also left to work with Yakobson.

Osipenko's son Ivan Voropayev was arrested and charged with "financial speculation" in 1986, he served 18 months in prison. He died in 1997.

Osipenko died in Saint Petersburg on 12 May 2025, aged 92.

== Awards ==
- 1956 Pavlova Prize (Paris)
- 1960 People's Artist of the Soviet Union (1960)
