= The Degraded =

- Directed by: Alexander Sokurov
- Written by: Alexander Sokurov
- Starring: Ilya Rivin; Viktoriya Yurizditskaya; Irina Sokolova; Yevgeny Mishenko; Andrei Petrov; Sergei Koshonin
- Cinematography: Sergey Yurizditsky
- Music by: Alexander Mikhailov
- Distributed by: Mosfilm; Lenfilm
- Release date: 1980
- Running time: 30 minutes
- Country: Soviet Union
- Language: Russian

The Degraded (Russian: Разжалованный, romanized: Razzhalovannïy) is the second film by Alexander Sokurov. It was released in 1980 and is of 30 minutes duration.

== Background ==
This film was Sokurov's first feature at Lenfilm. It was roughly based on a short story by the contemporary Soviet writer, Grigory Baklanov. Baklanov asked that his name be removed from the credits because the only motif that was adopted from Baklanov's work was the scene of the transitional period from power to subordinance. The amateur Ilya Rivin played the main character and appeared in three further movies by Sokurov.

== Miscellanea ==
Sokurov's first film, The Lonely Voice of Man appears in The Degraded when the protagonist is in a movie theater; Soviet officials in charge of cinema had yet to acknowledge the existence of Sokurov's earlier film.
