= Jeremy Noble =

Jeremy Noble may refer to:

- Jeremy Noble (musicologist) (1930–2017), English musicologist and music critic
- Jeremy Noble (writer) (born 1960), English writer, screenwriter, playwright and actor
