= Svetlana Svirko =

Soviet and Russian actress

- Born: Svetlana Igorevna Svirko; July 26, 1969 (age 56); Leningrad, Russian SFSR, Soviet Union
- Occupations: actress theatre director
- Years active: 1990-present

Svetlana Igorevna Svirko (Russian: Светла́на И́горевна Свирко́; July 26, 1969, Leningrad) is a Russian theatre director and actress.

== Biography ==
Svetlana was born on July 26, 1969, in Leningrad. She worked as a librarian at the National Library of Russia.

In 1996 she graduated from the Faculty of Acting and Directing of the St. Petersburg State Academy of Theater Arts with a degree in drama directing (teacher Irina Malochevskaya).

She made her film debut in 1989 with the role of Madeleine in the Soviet film adaptation of Cyrano de Bergerac (directed by Naum Birman).

For the role of Anna Akhmatova in the TV film Moon at Zenith (2007) she was awarded the Best Actress Award at the Kyiv International Film Festival (together with Svetlana Kryuchkova).

As a theatre director, she gained fame after staging the play Zaklikukhi according to her own script. The play, nominated for the theater award Golden Soffit (the highest theater award of St. Petersburg), was successfully accepted at the Avignon Festival.

He teaches directing and acting at the Saint Petersburg State Institute of Culture.

== Selected filmography ==
- Rock'n'roll for Princesses (1991) as Princess Chronicamara
- The Castle (1994) as Olga
- Russian Ark (2002) as Alexandra Feodorovna
- Father and Son (2003) as episode
- Streets of Broken Lights (2003) as Olga Feoktistova (TV Series)
- Pushkin: The Last Duel (2006) as Vera Fyodorovna Vyazemskaya
- Stalingrad (2013) as Raya
