= Mother and Son (1997 film) =

- Directed by: Aleksandr Sokurov
- Written by: Yuri Arabov
- Produced by: Thomas Kufus
- Starring: Aleksei Ananishnov; Gudrun Geyer
- Cinematography: Aleksey Fyodorov
- Edited by: Leda Semyonova
- Music by: Mikhail Ivanovich
- Release dates: February 20, 1997 (Berlin International Film Festival); September 27, 1997 (New York Film Festival); February 6, 1998 (USA)
- Running time: 73 minutes
- Countries: Russia; Germany
- Language: Russian

Mother and Son (Russian: Мать и сын, romanized: Mat i syn) is a 1997 Russian film directed by Aleksandr Sokurov, depicting the relationship between an old, dying mother and her young son. It was Sokurov's first internationally acclaimed feature film, and is the first volume of a planned trilogy whose subject matter is the study of the drama in human relationships. It is followed by Father and Son (2003), and planned to be followed by Two Brothers and a Sister, the final installment, though as of 2024 this last has not been made; his Alexandra (2007) is sometimes considered part of this series, as another film on similar themes. It was entered into the 20th Moscow International Film Festival where it won the Special Silver St. George.

== Plot ==
The film opens on two human forms, which soon reveal themselves to be that of a young man and a frail old woman. They recline in a silence broken only by whispers and indistinguishable noises. The young man is the son (Alexei Ananishnov) who is taking care of his exhausted sick mother (Gudrun Geyer). Her illness is undefined and from time to time causes her great pain as she gasps for air. Her son combs her hair, feeds her, covers her with a coat, and takes her in his arms. She is totally dependent on him as he himself was once totally dependent on her. As the film progresses, the son carries his mother on a long journey from her sickbed to her deathbed. It is a circular motion which travels a long walk through a dreamlike landscape in the countryside, along winding dirt roads. At each of their brief stops on the journey is a moment of contemplation, caresses, and tender murmurs. These soft murmurs tell of the mother's love for her son when she was nurturing him and of the son's love for his mother as he opens for her the mysterious path to her death. They progress under the leaden and luminous sky of the Baltic, in totally isolated landscapes. From time to time, there is a far away train or a sail on the sea, emphasizing further their isolation from the rest of the world.

They return to the house. The son tenderly lowers his mother into her bed that now seems to resemble a coffin. Although he tries to reassure her to the contrary they both know that the end is coming. He leaves her and goes for a long solitary walk. When he returns he weeps for his mother who's died.

== Themes ==
"Mother and Son" (1997) is a love story, not of romantic love as in "Romeo and Juliet" or "Tristan and Isolde", but rather regarding the profound emotional and spiritual ties that exist between a mother and her son.

The theme of death and of a mother and son recalls the Christian Passion, only here with the roles reversed – a dying mother, rather than a dying son – which has been called a "reverse pietà".

== Cinematography ==
The cinematography of the film featured images distorted by filming through painted glass panes, mirrors, and special lenses, together with sounds of "whispering wind, crashing waves, and sea-gull cries," creating an elegiac mood. The dreamy landscapes have been compared to the work of Caspar David Friedrich.

The painterly cinematography has been compared to the work of Peter Greenaway and Derek Jarman, and the distortions to Stan Brakhage.

== Reception ==
On the review aggregator website Rotten Tomatoes, 80% of 15 critics' reviews are positive, with an average rating of 8/10.
