= One Day in the Life of Andrei Arsenevich =

- Directed by: Chris Marker
- Written by: Chris Marker
- Produced by: Thierry Garrel
- Narrated by: Alexandra Stewart; Eva Mattes; Marina Vlady
- Cinematography: Marc-Andre Batigne
- Edited by: Chris Marker
- Release date: February 2000 (Berlin)
- Running time: 55 minutes
- Country: France

One Day in the Life of Andrei Arsenevich (French: Une journée d'Andrei Arsenevitch) is a 2000 French documentary film directed by Chris Marker about, and as an homage to, the Russian filmmaker Andrei Tarkovsky. The film was an episode of the French documentary film series Cinéastes de notre temps (Filmmakers of our time), which in over ninety episodes since 1966 concentrates on individual film directors, film people and film movements. The title of the film is a play on the title of Aleksandr Solzhenitsyn's novella One Day in the Life of Ivan Denisovich.

== Plot ==
The film combines clips from Tarkovsky's films with footage of Tarkovsky on the set of his last film The Sacrifice and on his deathbed, during the final stage of his battle with cancer. The film mostly relies on images, with only sparse commentary, and concentrates mainly on giving insight into Tarkovsky's work and philosophy and on exploring the intersections between his private life and his work. The film starts with a scene from Tarkovsky first film Ivan's Childhood and ends with a parallel scene from his last film The Sacrifice. It shows the reunion of Tarkovsky with his son Andrei Jr., who had been allowed to leave the Soviet Union only after Tarkovsky was diagnosed with terminal lung cancer. Apart from Andrei Tarkovsky himself the film shows, among others, his second wife Larisa Tarkovskaya, his son Andrei Jr., the editor of the film The Sacrifice Michal Leszczylowski, the French actress Valérie Mairesse, the Swedish cinematographer Sven Nykvist and the Russian actress Margarita Terekhova.

== Release ==
The film was screened at the 2000 Berlin International Film Festival, the 2000 San Francisco International Film Festival, the 2000 Telluride Film Festival, the 2000 Toronto International Film Festival and the 2001 Doubletake Documentary Film Festival. The film was also screened at the Santa Fe Film Festival in 2000 and won the best documentary award. The film was shown on the Franco-German TV channel Arte on 17 May 2000.

On June 21, 2011, Icarus Films released One Day in the Life of Andrei Arsenevich on home video. Included on the disc, alongside the film, are two short films about contemporary Russia: Three Songs About The Motherland by Marina Goldovskaya, and In the Dark by Sergey Dvortsevoy.

== Critical reception ==
Although not widely distributed, the film received very positive reviews. Jonathan Rosenbaum of the Chicago Reader writes that One Day in the Life of Andrei Arsenevich is "the best single piece of Tarkovsky criticism I know of, clarifying the overall coherence of his oeuvre while leaving all the principal mysteries in the films intact." whereas J. Hoberman of the Village Voice called the film "a brilliant appreciation of the last great Soviet director, Andrei Tarkovsky".

On review aggregator website Rotten Tomatoes, the film holds an approval rating of 100% based on 9 reviews, with an average rating of 9.2/10.

== Other documentaries about Tarkovsky ==
Several dozen other documentaries about Andrei Tarkovsky have been produced. Most notable are Voyage in Time by Tonino Guerra and Andrei Tarkovsky himself, Moscow Elegy by Alexander Sokurov, The Recall by Tarkovsky's son Andrei Jr., and Regi Andrej Tarkovskij by Michal Leszczylowski, the editor of Tarkovsky's The Sacrifice. Tarkovsky has also been featured in numerous documentaries about the history of cinema or the craft and art of filmmaking.
