= Sergey Yurizditsky =

Russian cinematographer (born 1947)

- Born: Sergey Petrovich Yurizditsky; 21 April 1947 (age 79); Sochi, RSFSR, USSR
- Occupation: cinematographer
- Years active: 1978–present
- Awards: Russian Guild of Film Critics Award (2000)

Sergey Petrovich Yurizditsky (Russian: Сергей Петрович Юриздицкий; born April 21, 1947, Sochi) is a Russian cinematographer. Honored Artist of Russia (1994).

Member of the Union of Cinematographers of the Russian Federation, and European Film Academy.

== Selected filmography ==
- The Lonely Voice of Man (1978)
- The Degraded (1980)
- Mournful Unconcern (1983)
- Days of Eclipse (1988)
- Save and Protect (1989)
- Humiliated and Insulted (1990)
- The Castle (1994)
- Streets of Broken Lights (1997)
- The Captain's Daughter (2000)
- Remote Access (2004)
- Family Name (2006)
