= Empire (1986 film) =

- Directed by: Alexander Sokurov
- Written by: Lucille Fletcher (play); Alexander Sokurov
- Starring: Alla Osipenko; Ilya Rivin
- Cinematography: Sergei Sidorov
- Edited by: L. Semenova; L. Volkova; N. Alexandrovna
- Music by: Giuseppe Verdi
- Distributed by: Lenfilm
- Release date: 1986
- Running time: 35 minutes
- Country: Soviet Union
- Language: Russian

Empire (Russian: Ампир, translit. Ampir; from French: empire) is a short film directed by Alexander Sokurov, released in 1986. The movie is based on a play by Lucille Fletcher.

== Plot ==
"She" is an elegant, refined older woman and former ballerina, who now uses a wheelchair due to paralysis. She has a keen taste for fashion magazines and smokes frequently. The story begins as she wakes up in her doll-like bed in an apartment near a railway bridge. She calls her husband, but when the operator connects the line, instead of her husband’s voice, she overhears a chilling conversation. The voices discuss plans to kill a helpless disabled woman who lives by the bridge and has become a burden to her husband. Shocked and horrified, she tries to alert both the operator and the police about the impending murder, but no one takes her seriously.

Gradually, she realizes with growing dread that the conversation was about her: she is the disabled woman by the bridge, a perceived burden to her husband. By the time this realization sinks in, it is already too late to save herself.

== Background ==
Empire was inspired by Lucille Fletcher's radio drama Sorry, Wrong Number. For the film, Sokurov, as often, selected a single motif from the work of inspiration – in this case, it was the sickness of a woman.

It was produced as the graduation work of S. Sidorov from the VGIK. At that time Sokurov was not allowed to work on his own films, and saw this as an opportunity to continue work in the field.
