= Voyage in Time =

- Directed by: Tonino Guerra; Andrei Tarkovsky
- Written by: Tonino Guerra; Andrei Tarkovsky
- Starring: Tonino Guerra; Andrei Tarkovsky
- Cinematography: Luciano Tovoli
- Edited by: Franco Letti
- Distributed by: Facets Video
- Release date: 1983
- Running time: 63 minutes
- Country: Italy
- Languages: Italian; Russian

Voyage in Time (Italian: Tempo di viaggio) is a 1983 Italian documentary film that archives the travels in Italy of Soviet filmmaker Andrei Tarkovsky with scriptwriter Tonino Guerra in preparation for the making of his film Nostalghia. In addition to the preparation of Nostalghia, their conversations cover a wide range of matters, filmmaking or not. Notably, Tarkovsky reveals his filmmaking philosophy and his admiration of films by, among others, Robert Bresson, Jean Vigo, Michelangelo Antonioni, Federico Fellini, Sergei Parajanov, and Ingmar Bergman.

The film screened in the Un Certain Regard section at the 1995 Cannes Film Festival.

== Similar documentaries ==
This is the only documentary about Andrei Tarkovsky which is also co-directed by Tarkovsky, although several dozen other documentaries about him have been produced. Most notable are One Day in the Life of Andrei Arsenevich by Chris Marker, Moscow Elegy by Alexander Sokurov, The Recall by Tarkovsky's son Andrei Jr., and Regi Andrej Tarkovskij (Directed by Andrei Tarkovsky) by Michal Leszczylowski, the editor of Tarkovsky's The Sacrifice. Tarkovsky has also been featured in numerous documentaries about the history of cinema or the craft and art of filmmaking.
