= Rock'n'roll for Princesses =

- Directed by: Radomir Vasilevsky
- Written by: Radiy Pogodin
- Cinematography: Sergei Stasenko
- Edited by: Viktoria Monyatovskaya
- Music by: David Tukhmanov
- Production company: Odessa Film Studio
- Release date: 1991
- Running time: 151 minutes
- Country: Soviet Union
- Language: Russian

Rock'n'roll for Princesses (Russian: Рок-н-ролл для принцесс, romanized: Rok-n-roll dlya printsess) is a 1991 Soviet children's fantasy film directed by Radomir Vasilevsky, based on the book Tournament in the Kingdom of Fiofegas by Radiy Pogodin.

== Plot ==
King of one fairy kingdom Philogerts (Viktor Pavlov) is concerned that his only son Prince Philotheus (Andrei Ankudinov) does not want to grow up. Then the king decides to get him married. To do this, he arranges a contest of princesses, the winner of which will become the wife of Philotheus. The court magician of the kingdom of Izmora (Gražina Baikštytė) helps to arrange the competition.

== Cast ==
- Gražina Baikštytė as Wizard of Izmora
- Viktor Pavlov as King of the Philogenians
- Andrey Ankudinov as Prince Philotheus
- Svetlana Nemolyaeva as Queen (vocals by Larisa Dolina)
- Lyudmila Arinina as teacher
- Pavel Vinnik as teacher
- Yevgeny Gerchakov as educator
- Vladimir Nosik as Lom, educator
- Svetlana Svirko as Princess Chronicamara
- Aleksandr Pashutin as advisor
- Alika Smekhova as Princess Lymphatusa
