= Fairytale (film) =

- Poster
- Directed by: Alexander Sokurov
- Written by: Alexander Sokurov
- Produced by: Nikolay Yankin
- Music by: Murat Kabardokov
- Production company: Intonations
- Release date: 6 August 2022 (Locarno)
- Running time: 78 minutes
- Countries: Russia; Belgium
- Languages: Georgian; German; Italian; English; French

Fairytale (Russian: Сказка, romanized: Skazka) is a 2022 experimental adult animated fantasy film written and directed by Alexander Sokurov. It depicts conversations in purgatory among Adolf Hitler, Benito Mussolini, Joseph Stalin, and Winston Churchill, using archival footage, and also features Jesus and Napoleon.

== Voice cast ==
- Lothar Deeg and Tim Ettelt as Hitler
- Vakhtang Kuchava as Stalin
- Fabio Mastrangelo as Mussolini
- Alexander Sagabashi and Michael Gibson as Churchill

== Release ==
The film had its world premiere in August 2022 at the 75th Locarno Film Festival. It was submitted to the 2022 Cannes Film Festival but was not selected.

The film was scheduled to be screened as the closing film at the Moscow "Karo.Art" Film Festival on 15 October 2023, but was denied a screening license by the Russian Ministry of Culture.

The film had its German premiere on October 15, 2023, at the Munich Stadtmuseum.

=== Ban in Russia ===
In October 2023, the film was banned in Russia. No specific reason was given, only subparagraph “zh” of paragraph 18 of the rules on the issuance of release certificates was cited: “in other cases determined by federal laws.” Sokurov emphasized that censorship is prohibited in Russia and no one has the right to restrict the Russian audience's access to works of art. “Because the movie has already been shown and is being shown all over the world,” he said.

== Reception ==
Fairytale has an approval rating of 88% on review aggregator website Rotten Tomatoes, based on 8 reviews, and an average rating of 7/10.

Neil Young of Screen Daily wrote, "while Fairytale stretches the viewer's indulgent patience even at a relatively brief 78 minutes, surrendering to its odd, oneiric flow can often prove an experience more pleasurable than purgatorial." Guy Lodge of Variety wrote that "even at just under 80 minutes, Fairytale too often appears to be running (or rather drifting) in place" but that "[a]s visions of purgatory go, it's an eerily beautiful one".

David Jenkins of Little White Lies wrote, "the novelty of the interactions and the almost lyrical directionlessness of the conversations manages to hold the attention, largely through the freshness and innovation of the visuals." Nicholas Bell of IONCINEMA called the film "a subversive reflection on the past as well as a hypnotic provocation", giving it three and a half out of five stars. Leonardo Goi of The Film Stage wrote, "lysergic and creatively fertile as its setup may sound, Fairytale is a rather staid dream", giving it a C+ grade.
