= Moloch (1999 film) =

- DVD release cover
- Directed by: Alexander Sokurov
- Written by: Yuri Arabov; Marina Koreneva
- Produced by: Andrey Deryabin; Thomas Kufus; Rio Santani; Michael Schmid-Ospach; Viktor Sergeyev
- Starring: Leonid Mozgovoy; Yelena Rufanova; Vladimir Bogdanov; Leonid Sokol; Yelena Spiridonova; Anatoli Shvedersky
- Cinematography: Aleksei Fyodorov; Anatoli Rodionov
- Edited by: Leda Semyonova
- Production companies: Arte; Fabrica; Fusion Product; Goskino; Lenfilm Studio; Westdeutscher Rundfunk (WDR); Zero Film GmbH
- Distributed by: Koch Lorber Films
- Release date: 1999
- Running time: 108 minutes
- Country: Russia
- Language: German

Moloch (Russian: Молох) is a 1999 Russian biographical film, directed by Alexander Sokurov. The storyline was conceived from a screenplay written by Yuri Arabov and Marina Koreneva. It portrays Adolf Hitler living life in an unassuming manner during an abrupt journey to the Bavarian Alps. The film stars actors Leonid Mozgovoy, Yelena Rufanova, Vladimir Bogdanov, and Leonid Sokol in principal roles. Moloch explores companionship, intimacy and dictatorship.

A joint collective effort to commit to the film's production was made by a number of studios, including Arte, Fabrica, Fusion Product, Goskino and Lenfilm Studio. It was commercially distributed by Koch Lorber Films. Following its release, the film was entered into the 1999 Cannes Film Festival and won other awards selections, including those from the Russian Guild of Film Critics Awards. The film was also selected as the Russian entry for the Best Foreign Language Film at the 72nd Academy Awards, but it didn't make the final shortlist. It was generally met with mixed critical reviews before its initial screening in 1999.

== Plot ==
In the spring of 1942, a few months before the notorious Battle of Stalingrad, Adolf Hitler (Leonid Mozgovoy) retires to his secluded Berghof Retreat, on a remote hilltop of the Bavarian Alps, near Berchtesgaden in Bavaria, to unite with his long-time female companion Eva Braun (Yelena Rufanova). At the residence, Braun spends her spare time with trivial pursuits such as whimsically dancing in the nude, humming to military-style marching band music, and rummaging through Hitler's personal belongings. Later, Braun is thrilled to learn that her beloved "Adi", as she affectionately calls him, will be joining her for a visit. Hitler is accompanied by guests Joseph Goebbels (Leonid Sokol), Magda Goebbels (Yelena Spiridonova), Martin Bormann (Vladimir Bogdanov), and a priest (Anatoli Shvedersky) for conversation and playful banter.

During his stop-over, Hitler raves and rants on topics ranging from food, health, and climate change to wartime politics. After roaming through the mountainous landscape, Hitler is triumphant upon hearing of Germany's military victories. In a scene of political satire, he claims to have never heard of the Auschwitz concentration camp. Towards the end of Hitler's visit, Braun reminds him that no one can escape death or is infallible in an attempt to expose a hidden weakness within him as he embarks with his motorcade to continue Nazi Germany's military campaign.

== Cast ==
- Leonid Mozgovoy as Adolf Hitler
- Yelena Rufanova as Eva Braun
- Vladimir Bogdanov as Martin Bormann
- Leonid Sokol as Joseph Goebbels
- Yelena Spiridonova as Magda Goebbels
- Anatoli Shvedersky as the Priest

== Production ==
=== Filming ===
Directed by Russian filmmaker Alexander Sokurov, the film is the first in Sokurov's tetralogy of power. It was succeeded by Taurus (2000), about Vladimir Lenin, The Sun (2005), involving Japanese emperor Hirohito, and Faust (2011), based on the old German legend Faust. For production, Sokurov employed Russian actors from Saint Petersburg to shoot Moloch, but their voices were later dubbed by German theater actors from Berlin.

== Reception ==
=== Critical response ===
Critical reaction to the film was mixed. Peter Bradshaw of Guardian highly praised the film: "Ultimately, Mosgovoi's Hitler is so convincing, that there are times when it is almost hair-raising." Jonathan Rosenbaum noted stylistic resemblance to Leni Riefenstahl's manner in parts, and an apparent break with the director's previous films: "Sokurov’s films usually project moods and emotions, but this one mainly provokes thoughts and reflections." Jim Hoberman of The Village Voice wrote, "Moloch is lurid without being commercial. Evoking the German romantic landscape he synthesized for Mother and Son, Sokurov places his characteristic understatement at the service of borderline kitsch." Likewise, Jason Anderson of Eye Weekly gave the film a five-star rating, commenting, "Though he hopes to extract the man from the mythology, he doesn't merely humanize a figure in any conventional sense, as Downfall did to Hitler with troubling results." Dennis Schwartz gave the film a B− grade, stating "Moloch is an odd curio, and in some respects utterly fascinating .... the film unearthed a few sublime moments to make the overall effort worthwhile." Derek Elley of Variety did not like the film, noting "There are no new revelations in this portrayal of an arrogant madman and his sycophants, and though impressive at first, Sokurov's glacial treatment, with its deliberately soft-focus look, pales after a while." On the review aggregator website Rotten Tomatoes, 60% of 5 critics' reviews are positive.

=== Accolades ===
The film won four awards at the 1999 Russian Guild of Film Critics Awards, including; Best Actor, Best Actress, Best Cinematography and Best Script. At the 1999 Cannes Film Festival, the film won the Best Screenplay Award. It was also chosen as Russia's official Best Foreign Language Film submission at the 72nd Academy Awards, but did not manage to receive a nomination.

== See also ==
- List of submissions to the 72nd Academy Awards for Best Foreign Language Film
- List of Russian submissions for the Academy Award for Best Foreign Language Film
