= The Second Circle =

- Directed by: Alexander Sokurov
- Written by: Yuri Arabov
- Starring: Pyotr Aleksandrov; Nadezhda Rodnova; Tamara Timofeeva
- Cinematography: Aleksandr Burov
- Edited by: Raisa Lisova
- Production company: Lenfilm
- Release date: 1990 (Soviet Union)
- Running time: 92 min
- Country: Soviet Union
- Language: Russian

The Second Circle (Russian: Круг второй) is a 1990 Soviet drama film directed by Aleksandr Sokurov that tells the story of a young man who tries to deal with his father's death and the difficulties of his burial in a worldly society.

== Reception ==
Slant said of the film: "Meditative, exasperating, and sublime, The Second Circle locates the painful grace of being finally free to gaze deeply into the eyes of the dead father and move on with life and art."
