= The Dialogues with Solzhenitsyn =

1998 Russian TV documentary

- Written by: Alexander Sokurov
- Directed by: Alexander Sokurov
- Starring: Aleksandr Solzhenitsyn
- Country of origin: Russia
- Original language: Russian

Production
- Producer: Svetlana Voloshina
- Cinematography: Aleksandr Degtyaryov, Aleksey Fyodorov
- Running time: 187 minutes
- Production company: Nadezhda (St. Petersburg)

Original release
- Release: 1998

The Dialogues with Solzhenitsyn (Russian: Беседы с Солженицыным) is a Russian television documentary by Russian filmmaker Alexander Sokurov on Aleksandr Solzhenitsyn. The documentary shot in Solzhenitsyn's home shows his everyday life and covers his reflections on Russian history and literature.
