= Sokurov's Voice =

- Directed by: Leena Kilpeläinen
- Written by: Leena Kilpeläinen
- Produced by: Merja Ritola; Pertti Veijalainen; Karin Reinberg; Anastasia Pavlovich
- Cinematography: Leena Kilpeläinen; Alexander Burov
- Edited by: Tambet Tasuja
- Music by: Timo-Juhani Kyllönen
- Production companies: Illume; Revolver Film; LM-Media
- Release date: 14 June 2014; (Midnight Sun Film Festival)
- Running time: 84 minutes
- Countries: Finland; Estonia; Germany

Sokurov's Voice (Finnish: Sokurovin ääni) is a 2014 documentary film directed and written by Leena Kilpeläinen.It is an international co-production between Finland, Estonia, and Germany.

The film is a personal and artistic documentary about the Russian film director Aleksandr Sokurov. It features Sokurov discussing his own films, the history of Russian cinema, and the current state of filmmaking in Russia.

== Reception ==
Jay Weissberg of Variety commented that "Kilpelainen's interviews, shot over five years yet compiled as if done in seven days, looks at the breadth of the man's achievements rather than the details, and is most interesting when the cultivated director offers insights into his way of thinking."
