= Moscow Elegy =

- Moscow Elegy DVD cover
- Directed by: Alexander Sokurov
- Written by: Alexander Sokurov
- Starring: Andrei Tarkovsky; Tonino Guerra
- Narrated by: Alexander Sokurov
- Cinematography: Alexander Burov; Alexei Naydenov
- Edited by: Lyudmila Feiginova; Tatyana Belousova; Alexandra Zhikhareva; Leda Semenova; Lida Volkova
- Release date: 1988
- Running time: 88 minutes
- Country: Soviet Union
- Language: Russian

Moscow Elegy (Russian: Московская элегия) is a 1988 documentary film directed by Alexander Sokurov, about the later life and death of Soviet Russian filmmaker Andrei Tarkovsky. The film was originally intended to mark Tarkovsky's 50th birthday in 1982, which would have been before his death in 1986. Controversy with Soviet authorities about the film's style and content led to significant delays in the production.

== Production ==
The film consists mostly of Sokurov's narration over stock footage from Tarkovsky's films The Mirror, Nostalghia, Voyage in Time, and The Sacrifice, as well as footage of Tarkovsky shot during production for The Sacrifice. Some footage was supplied by Chris Marker. Sokurov also shot footage of various houses and apartments where Tarkovsky had lived. With the exception of some of the archival footage, the film is entirely in black and white. Sokurov and the crew had scheduled a total of 12 days for the entire production.

== Reception ==
The film was first screened at Dom Kino in Moscow in 1987 on Tarkovsky's birthday, and many Russian filmmakers and actors (for example Alexander Kaidanovsky) strongly disliked it.

== Similar documentaries ==
Several other documentaries about Andrei Tarkovsky have been produced. Most notable are Voyage in Time by Tonino Guerra and Andrei Tarkovsky himself, One Day in the Life of Andrei Arsenevich by Chris Marker, The Recall by Tarkovsky's son Andrei Jr., and Regi Andrej Tarkovskij by Michal Leszczylowski, the editor of Tarkovsky's The Sacrifice. Tarkovsky has also been featured in numerous documentaries about the history of cinema or the craft and art of filmmaking.
