= Break-through (2006 film) =

- Russian: Прорыв
- Directed by: Vitaliy Lukin
- Written by: Vyacheslav Davydov; Ivan Loshchilin
- Produced by: Vyacheslav Davydov
- Starring: Ildus Abrahmanov; Andrey Abramov; Andrei Bogdanov as Ivolgin; Anton Borisov as Mytarin; Oleg Stefan
- Release date: 2006
- Country: Russia
- Language: Russian

Break-through (Russian: Прорыв) is a 2006 Russian war drama film directed by Vitaliy Lukin.

== Plot ==
The film takes place during the anti-terrorist operation in Chechnya in 2000. The Russian army is looking for gangs hiding in the mountains. One reconnaissance group engages in a battle with a detachment of militants. But the battle will be very difficult.

== Cast ==
- Ildus Abrahmanov
- Andrey Abramov
- Andrei Bogdanov as Ivolgin
- Anton Borisov as Mytarin
- Oleg Stefan as Col. Gen. Selivanov (as Oleg Shtefanko)
- Igor Lifanov as Capt. Fyodor Stozharov
