= Dina Rubina =

Russian-Israeli prose writer (born 1953)

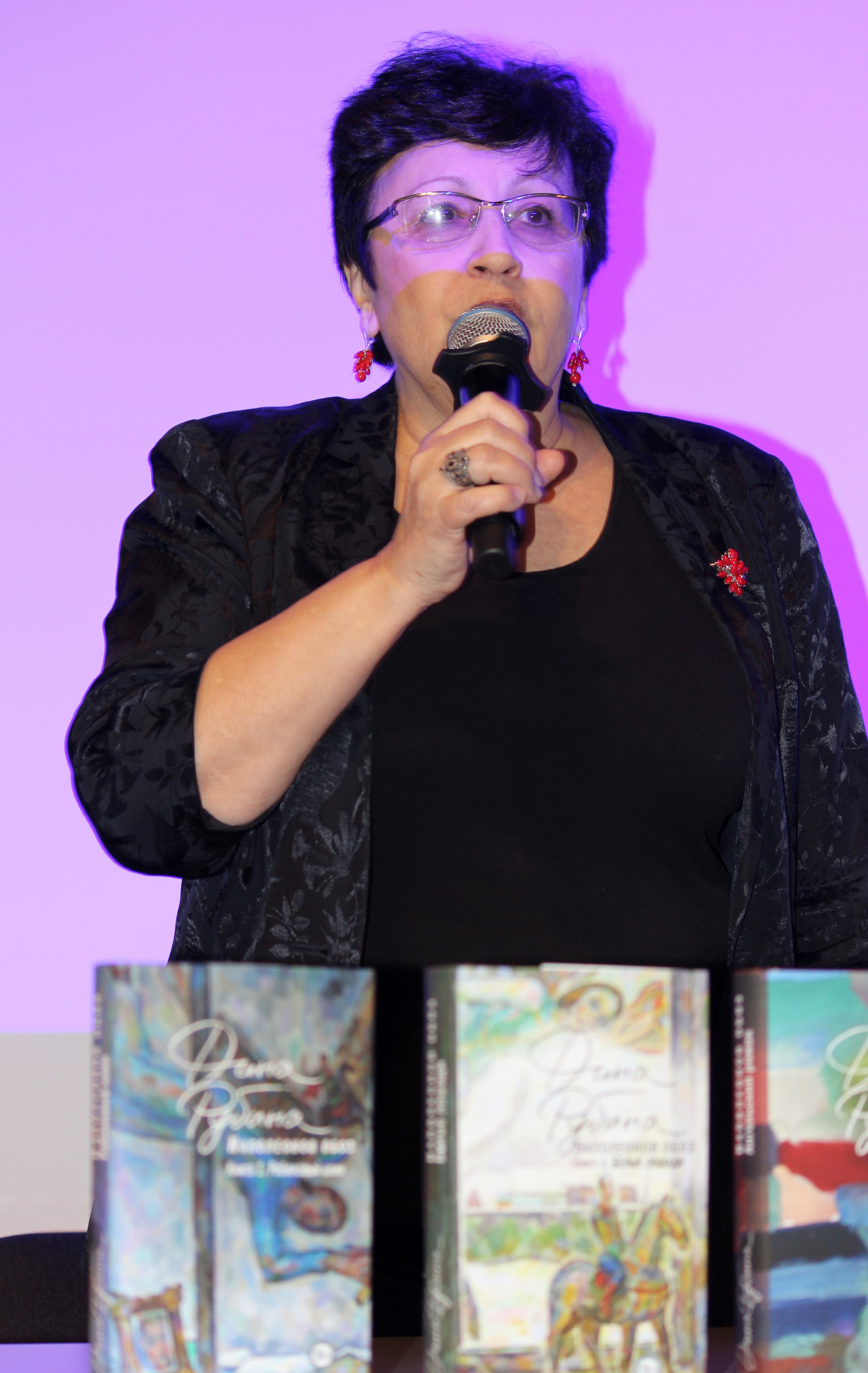
Rubina at the 21 Moscow International Fair Non/fiction, 2019

Dina Ilyinichna Rubina (Russian: Дина Ильи́нична Ру́бина, Hebrew: דינה רובינה; born 19 September 1953 in Tashkent) is a Russian-language Israeli prose writer.

== Biography ==
Rubina was born in Tashkent, Uzbekistan. She studied music at the Tashkent Conservatory and published her first story at the age of 16 in Yunost. In the mid-1980s, after stage and screen writing for several years, she moved to Moscow. In 1990, she made aliyah. Lived in Ma’aleh Adumim, then in Mevaseret Zion.

== Literary career ==
Rubina is one of the most prominent Russian-language Israeli writers. Her books have been translated into 30 languages. Her major themes are Jewish and Israeli history, migration, nomadism, neo-indigeneity, messianism, metaphysics, theatre, autobiography and the interplay between the Israeli and Russian Jewish cultures and languages.

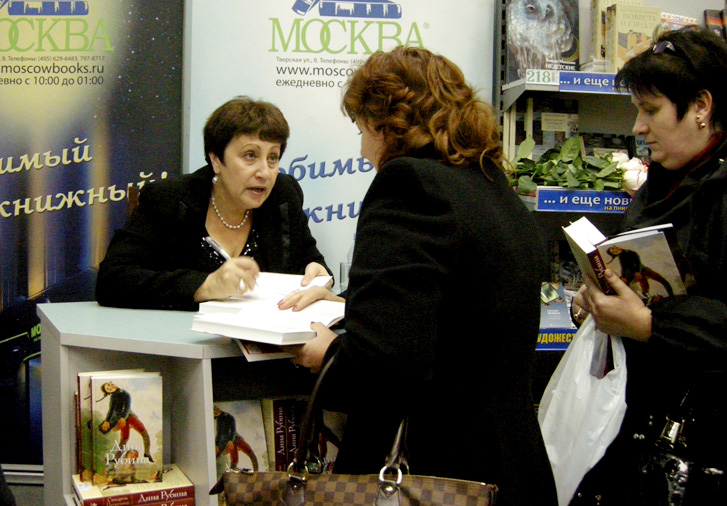
Dina Rubina in Moscow, 2010

Dual Surname (Russian: Двойная фамилия) was adapted into a movie released in 2006 and aired on Russia's Channel One.

In 2007, Rubina won the Russian Big Book literary award.

== Political position ==
In 2014, after the Russian annexation of Crimea and the start of the war in Donbas, she supported Ukraine and stated that she was “disgusted by violence and attacks on a neighboring state, and any annexation of foreign territory is disgusting.”

In 2025, speaking in support of the Israeli invasion of the Gaza Strip, she said that Israel has “the right to cleanse Gaza and turn it into just a parking lot” and to "dissolve all [Gazans] in hydrochloric acid”, because “there are no innocent civilians there.” Following her statements, her scheduled appearances in Uzbekistan, Kazakhstan, and Georgia were canceled. Additionally, the Presidium of the Spiritual Administration of Muslims of Russia urged authorities to examine Rubina’s statements from a legal standpoint and called on media outlets to cease collaboration with the writer.

== Published works ==
=== Novels ===
- 1996 — Here Comes the Messiah! («Вот идёт Мессия!»)
- 1998 — The last wild boar from the forests of Pontevedra («Последний кабан из лесов Понтеведра»)
- 2004 — The Syndicate («Синдикат»)
- 2006 — Sunny side of the Street(«На солнечной стороне улицы»)
- 2008 — Leonardo's handwriting («Почерк Леонардо») ISBN 978-5-699-27962-3, 978-5-699-27369-0, 3 more editions
- 2009 — White dove of Cordova («Белая голубка Кордовы»), ISBN 978-5-699-37343-7, 2 more editions
- 2010 — Petrushka's Syndrome («Синдром Петрушки»). ISBN 978-5-699-45611-6
- 2014 — Russian Canary. Book 1. Zheltukhin («Русская канарейка». Кн. 1, «Желтухин»). ISBN 978-5-04-093698-4
- 2014 — Russian Canary. Book 2. Voice («Русская канарейка». Кн. 2, «Голос»). ISBN 978-5-04-094049-3
- 2014 — Russian Canary. Book 3. Prodigal Son («Русская канарейка». Кн. 3, «Блудный сын»). ISBN 978-5-04-095218-2
- 2017 — Female Wind («Бабий ветер»). ISBN 978-5-699-96406-2
- 2018 — Napoleon's convoy. Book 1. Rowan Wedge, also translated as Napoleon's Supply Train («Наполеонов обоз». Кн. 1, «Рябиновый клин»). ISBN 978-5-04-098081-9
- 2019 — Napoleon's convoy. Book 2. White Horses («Наполеонов обоз». Кн. 2, «Белые лошади»). ISBN 978-5-04-098081-9
- 2019 — Napoleon's Convoy. Book 3. Angel's Bugle («Наполеонов обоз». Кн. 3, «Ангельский рожок»). ISBN 978-5-04-106025-1
- 2020 — Lonely Writing Person («Одинокий пишущий человек»). ISBN 978-5-04-110763-5
- 2021 — Maniac Gurevich («Маньяк Гуревич»). ISBN 978-5-04-154907-7

=== Short stories ===
- 1980 — «Когда же пойдёт снег…?»
- 1982 — «Дом за зелёной калиткой»
- 1987 — «Отворите окно!»
- 1990 — «Двойная фамилия»
- 1994 — «Один интеллигент уселся на дороге»
- 1996 — «Уроки музыки»
- 1997 — «Ангел конвойный»
- 1999 — «Высокая вода венецианцев»
- 1999 — «Астральный полёт души на уроке физики»
- 2002 — «Глаза героя крупным планом»
- 2002 — «Воскресная месса в Толедо»
- 2002 — «Во вратах твоих»
- 2003 — «Несколько торопливых слов любви»
- 2004 — «Наш китайский бизнес»
- 2008 — «Астральный полёт души на уроке физики»
- 2008 — «Итак, продолжаем!..»
- 2008 — «Мастер-тарабука»
- 2008 — «Чужие подъезды»
- 2008 — «Холодная весна в Провансе»
- 2008 — «Камера наезжает!..» повесть
- 2009 — «Любка»
- 2010 — «Миф сокровенный…». Издательство: Эксмо, твёрдый переплёт, 432 с., тираж 4000 экз., ISBN 978-5-699-41269-3
- 2010 — «Больно только когда смеюсь». Издательство: Эксмо, ISBN 978-5-699-43666-8; 2010 г.
- 2010 — «Адам и Мирьям». Авторский сборник. Издательство: Эксмо, твёрдый переплёт, 416 с., тираж: 4000 экз., ISBN 978-5-699-39797-6
- 2010 — «Фарфоровые затеи»
- 2011 — «Душегубица»
- 2012 — «Окна»

=== Essays ===
- 1999 — «Под знаком карнавала»
- «Я — офеня»
- «Я не любовник макарон, или кое-что из иврита»
- Call me! («Позвони мне, позвони!»)
- «Дети» (Children)
- «А не здесь вы не можете не ходить?!»
- 2001 - What to do? («Чем бы заняться?»)
- Mein pijak in weisse kletka («Майн пиджак ин вайсе клетка…»)
- Jerusalem bus («Иерусалимский автобус»)
- Afterwords («Послесловие к сюжету»)

=== English translations ===
"The Blackthorn" is a story from Lives in Transit, Ardis Publishers, 1995.
