= Yacobson Ballet =

Dance company in Saint Petersburg

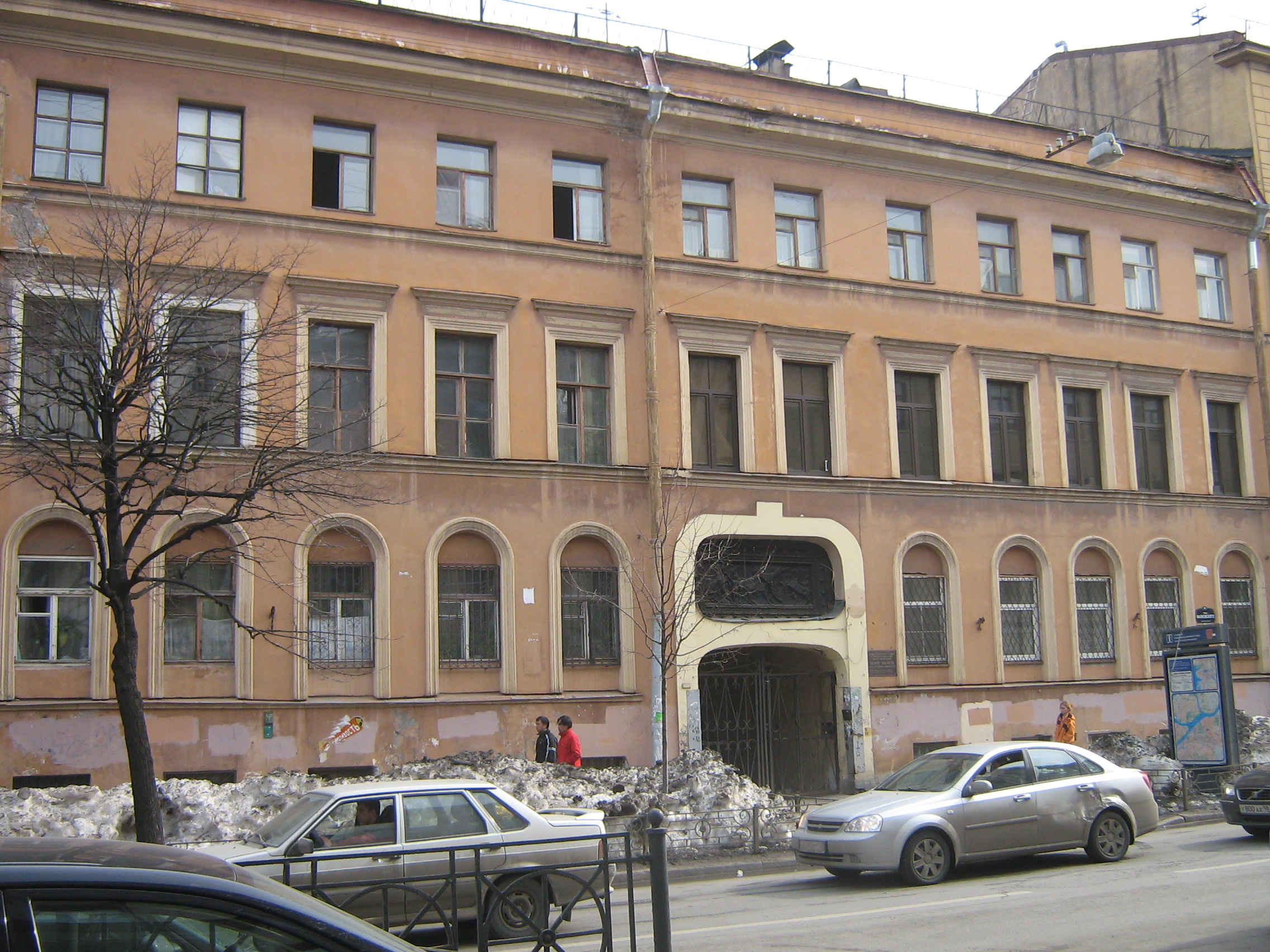
Yacobson Ballet 2011

Yacobson Ballet (Russian: Театр балета имени Леонида Якобсона) is a Russian ballet company in Saint Petersburg. It was founded in 1969 by Ballet Master and choreographer Leonid Yacobson.

It was the first Russian independent company which gained prominence within the Russian ballet landscape and received the title of "Miniature Company", referring to the short lengths of the pieces created by its founder. During seven years as a director, Yacobson worked on the development of dance in Russia and collaborated with dancers including Natalia Makarova, Alla Osipenko, Maya Plisetskaya and Mikhail Baryshnikov.

After Yacobson's death in 1976, his closest collaborator opened the repertoire to Russian and foreign choreographers, developing a repertoire of creations based on the founding technique of ballet. The company also began to work outside of Russia.

== Under Andrian Fadeev's direction ==
Since 2011, the Yacobson Ballet has been directed by Andrian Fadeev, ex-principal dancer of the Mariinsky Ballet. Fadeev wanted to bring the company's 75 dancers to an international level. He rejuvenated ballets from the classical repertoire. And following tradition, he commissioned and updated stage productions and costume designs. He shortened and modernized traditional pieces, keeping their essentials.

Fadeev was born October 22, 1977, in Leningrad (now Saint Petersburg). He graduated from Vaganova Ballet Academy (class of Prof. Vladilen Semenov). He joined the Mariinsky Theatre (Saint Petersburg) in 1995 and became its principal dancer in 1997.

=== Works ===
Andrian performed the main parts in La Sylphide, Giselle, Le Corsaire, La Bayadere, The Sleeping Beauty, Awakening of Flora, Swan Lake, Raymonda, Don Quixote, Le spectre de la rose, Petrushka, The fountain of Bakhchisarai, Romeo and Juliet.

He performed in the company of George Balanchin: Apollo, Ballet Imperial (later referred to as Tschaikovsky Piano Concerto No. 2), Tschaikovsky Pas de Deux, Jewels, in the ballets of John Neumeier: Spring and Fall and Now and Then. Specifically for him Neumeier created the main part in the ballet The sounds of the empty pages.

=== Recognition ===
- Vaganova-prix competition (St Petersburg, 1995),
- Baltika Prize (1998),
- St Petersburg Golden Sofit theatre prize (1999, 2000),
- Spirit of Dance prize in the category Star by Ballet magazine (2000),
- Leonide Massine Prize (Italy, Positano, 2006).
