= Alika Smekhova =

Russian actress (born 1968)

Alika Smekhova HAR
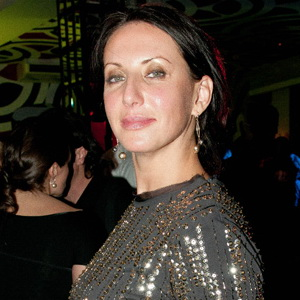
- Born: Alla Veniaminovna Smekhova; 27 March 1968 (age 58); Moscow, RSFSR, USSR
- Occupations: actress singer TV presenter
- Years active: 1985–present

Alika Veniaminovna Smekhova (Russian: А́лика Вениами́новна Сме́хова; real name Alla, March 27, 1968, Moscow, RSFSR, USSR) is a Soviet and Russian actress, singer, TV presenter. Honored Artist of Russia (2008).

== Biography ==
Alla Veniaminovna Smekhova was born on March 27, 1968, in Moscow in the family of actor Veniamin Smekhov and radio journalist Alla Smekhova.

Her sister Elena (born 1963), is now a writer.

She began acting in film in 1985.

In 1991 she graduated from the Russian Academy of Theatrical Art (GITIS), specializing in Music Theater Actor.

The most popular songs in her performance Do Not Interrupt (a duet with Alexander Buinov) and Another's Kiss.

She was married three times. Her first husband was scriptwriter of the film Assa Sergei Livnev. There are two sons Artyom (2000) and Makar (2007)

In 2022, she opposed the Russian invasion of Ukraine.

== Selected filmography ==
- Courier as Nina (1986)
- Rock'n'roll for Princesses as Princess Lymphatusa (1991)
- Kiks (a.k.a. The Miss a.k.a. Cracked) (1992)
- My Fair Nanny as cameo (2004)
- Love in the Big City as Raisa (2009)
- Office Romance. Our Time as woman on the session (2011)
- You and I as Lana's mother (2011)
- Two Fathers, Two Sons as Margo (2013–2016)
- Londongrad as Lidia (2015)

In Russian dubbing cartoon Cars and its sequels voiced by Sally Carrera (original voice actress: Bonnie Hunt).

== Discography ==
- I'm Waiting for You Very Much (1996)
- Another's Kiss (1997)
- Wild Duck (1999)
- For You (2002)
