= Confession (miniseries) =

- Russian: Повинность (из дневников командира Корабля, повествование в пяти частях)
- Written by: Alexander Sokurov
- Directed by: Alexander Sokurov
- Music by: Richard Wagner; Sergei Rachmaninov; Pyotr Tchaikovsky; Toru Takemitsu
- Country of origin: Russia
- Original language: Russian
- No. of seasons: 1
- No. of episodes: 5

Production
- Producer: S. Voloshina
- Cinematography: A. Fedorov
- Editor: L. Semenova
- Running time: 210 minutes

Original release
- Release: 1998

Confession (Russian: Повинность (из дневников командира Корабля, повествование в пяти частях), lit. 'From the diaries of the captain, story in five parts') is a Russian documentary by Alexander Sokurov released in 1998 as a five-part miniseries on television. The series follows the lives of Russian sailors aboard a battleship in the Barents Sea.

In Confession, Sokurov films officers from the Russian Navy, showing the monotony and lack of freedom of their everyday lives. The dialogue allows us to follow the reflections of a Ship Commander. Sokurov and his crew went aboard a naval patrol ship headed for Kuvshinka, a naval base in the Murmansk region, in the Barents Sea. Confined within the limited space of a ship anchored in Arctic waters, the team filmed the sailors as they went about their routine activities.
