= Jeremy Noble (writer) =

English writer and actor

- Born: Jeremy Mark Noble; 9 July 1960 (age 66); Stanborough Park, Garston
- Education: MA English Literature
- Alma mater: Magdalene College Cambridge
- Occupations: Writer, screenwriter, playwright, actor
- Website: jeremynoble.com

Jeremy Mark Noble (born 9 July 1960) is an English writer, screenwriter, playwright and actor.

== Early life and education ==
Noble attended King's School, Bruton, and read English Literature at Magdalene College, Cambridge, where he was supervised by the poet Geoffrey Hill, and graduated with upper second-class honours in 1987. He won a Half Blue for polo, playing for Cambridge University against Oxford University (Cambridge won 3–2, 7 June 1987). He was honorary treasurer for Cambridge University Polo Club.

== Career ==
Noble moved to Saint Petersburg, Russia, to become a writer. He has since worked with various Russian cultural figures including Valery Gergiev, Alexander Sokurov, and Vladimir Bortko.

Noble has written for The Washington Post, St. Petersburg Press, P. N. Review, Literary Review, Open Democracy Russia, and Open Russia. He has written extensively about Russian ballet, and for Dance Magazine.

Noble has translated extensively from Russian into English, for major arts organisations and events, the president of the Russian Federation, and the mayor of Moscow.

Noble wrote the English-language dialogue for the 2005 film The Sun (directed by Alexander Sokurov). His play Marlene Made Me was shortlisted for the UK International Playwriting Festival, 2004. He was co-writer and guest historian for Glamour Puds, series 2, episode 9.

He has been seen on Russian TV in the role of Dr Paulson in Peter the Great: The Testament, directed by Vladimir Bortko, and on Ukrainian TV in the role of President of the Council of Vampires in Split, directed by Vlad Lanne.

Noble wrote the English-language dialogue for the 2015 film Dusha shpiona (in English The Soul of a Spy), directed by Vladimir Bortko, starring Malcolm McDowell, Liam Cunningham, Sandrine Bonnaire, Fyodor Bondarchuk, and Andrey Chernyshov.

Noble co-wrote the book for Kingmaker the Musical, which received its premiere at the St James Theatre, London, 31 March 2015.

He is the editor of Opposing Forces: Plotting the new Russia, a published account of the conversation in Red Square, Moscow, between opposition leader Alexei Navalny and the Polish intellectual and former dissident Adam Michnik.

His first novel Villa Eilenroc was published in 2016. His second novel A Russian Ending was published in 2022.

== Writing and acting credits ==
List of television, film and theatre credits
Year	Title	Notes
1995	The Glorious Tradition: A History of Russian Ballet	Video film in two volumes; written and narrated by Jeremy Noble
1996	Smith	Miranda Theatre, New York
1998	Tchaikovsky's Death	
2004	Marlene Made Me	Shortlisted UK International Playwriting Festival, 2004
2005	The Sun (in Russian: Солнце)	English-language dialogue by Jeremy Noble; Premiere: Berlin Film Festival 2005; Screened: New York Film Festival 2005, Toronto International Film Festival 2005, Karlovy Vary International Film Festival 2005
2008	Дилер (in English The Dealer)	Created, and co-written by Jeremy Noble: Episode 1 "Портрет Императора" (in English "Portrait of an Emperor") Writers: Jeremy Noble, Albina Shulgina, Vadim Mikhailov; Episode 2 "Наследница" (in English "The Heiress") Writers: Jeremy Noble, Albina Shulgina, Vadim Mikhailov; Episode 3 "Memento Mori" Writers: Jeremy Noble, Albina Shulgina, Vadim Mikhailov; Episode 4 "Осквернители Могил" (in English "Tomb Raiders") Writers: Jeremy Noble, Albina Shulgina, Vadim Mikhailov; Episode 5 "Подделка" (in English "Fake") Writers: Jeremy Noble, Albina Shulgina, Vadim Mikhailov; Episode 6 "Портрет Неизвестноо" (in English "Portrait by an Unknown Artist") Writers: Jeremy Noble, Albina Shulgina, Vadim Mikhailov; Episode 7 "Старуха На Обочине" (in English "An Old Woman on the Edge") Writers: Jeremy Noble, Albina Shulgina, Vadim Mikhailov; Episode 8 "Медные Всадники" (in English "The Bronze Horsemen") Writers: Jeremy Noble, Igor Shiritz
2010	Glamour Puds	Season 2, Episode 9; co-writer and guest historian Jeremy Noble
2011	A Drunken Foreigner in Streets of Broken Lights (in Russian: Улицы разбитых фонарей)	Othello of the Northern Palmyra, series 11, episode 17 (in Russian: Отелло Северной Пальмиры, 17 серия)
2011	Dr Paulson in Peter the Great: The Testament (Петр Первый. Завещение. Rossiya TV, Russia)	Premiere: "Rossiya 1" TV channel on 14 May 2011 (parts 1 and 2), and 15 May (parts 3 and 4).
2012	President of the Council of Vampires in Split (in Russian: Сплит)	Premiere: TET TV, Ukraine, 2011
2015	Dusha shpiona (in English The Soul of a Spy)	English-language dialogue by Jeremy Noble; 2015 Montreal World Film Festival: Official Selection
2015	Kingmaker the Musical	Book by Jeremy Noble, Bill Robinson, Sophie Austin; Premiere: St James Theatre, London, 31 March 2015

== Bibliography ==
- Noble, Jeremy (2022). A Russian Ending. London: Egret Press. ISBN 978-0-993386978.
- Noble, Jeremy (2016). Villa Eilenroc. London: Egret Press. ISBN 978-0-993386947.
- Noble, Jeremy (2016). Opposing Forces: Plotting the new Russia. London: Egret Press. ISBN 978-0-993386961.
- Noble, Jeremy (2000). Millennium of Russian Ballet 2001: Desk Diary. London: Russian Steppes. ISBN 978-1-928563068.
- Noble, Jeremy (1999). St. Petersburg: A Century of Russian Ballet – Desk Diary 2000. London: Russian Steppes. ISBN 978-1-928563006.
