= Taurus (2001 film) =

2001 film

- Film poster
- Directed by: Alexander Sokurov
- Written by: Yuri Arabov
- Based on: Moloch by Alexander Sokurov
- Produced by: Vladimir Persov
- Starring: Leonid Mozgovoy
- Cinematography: Alexander Sokurov
- Edited by: Leda Semyonova
- Music by: Andrey Sigle; Sergei Rachmaninov
- Production companies: Lenfilm; State Committee for Cinematography; Ministry of Culture (Russia)
- Release date: 16 May 2001
- Running time: 104 minutes
- Country: Russia
- Language: Russian

Taurus (Russian: Телец, romanized: Telets) is a 2001 Russian biographical drama film directed by Alexander Sokurov, portraying Vladimir Lenin. It is the second film in a trilogy by director Aleksandr Sokurov that began with Moloch about Nazi Germany's Adolf Hitler and continued with The Sun about Japanese emperor Hirohito. It was entered into the 2001 Cannes Film Festival.

== Plot ==
In the face of illness, the historical personality turns out to be simply a man powerless to change anything in the fate of a country that is not yet under his control, the fate of his doomed awkward family, or the fate of his decaying personality.

== Cast ==
- Leonid Mozgovoy as Vladimir Lenin
- Mariya Kuznetsova as Krupskaya
- Sergei Razhuk as Joseph Stalin
- Natalya Nikulenko as Sister
- Lev Yeliseyev as Doctor
- Nikolai Ustinov as Pacoly

== Awards ==
- 2001 Russian Guild of Film Critics Awards:
  - Best Film, Best Director (Alexander Sokurov), Best Female Actor (Mariya Kuznetsova), Best Male Actor (Leonid Mozgovoy), Best Screenplay (Yuri Arabov), Best Director of Photography (Alexander Sokurov, Aleksei Rodionov) and Best Art Direction (Natalia Kochergina)

Other awards and nominations include:

- Grand Prix and Award for Leonid Mozgovoy and Mariya Kuznetsova, "Window to Europe" Festival of Russian Cinema at Vyborg, Russia, 2001
- Russian State Prize to Aleksandr Sokurov and Y. Arabov, Russia, 2001
- Gold Griffon Award, Festival of Festivals, St. Petersburg, Russia, 2001
- Best Director, Aleksandr Sokurov, and Press Award for the film, at Vivat, Russian Cinema FF, St. Petersburg, 2001
- Best Male Lead, Leonid Mozgovoy, Listapad IFF, Minsk, Belarus, 2001
- Special Mention, Mariya Kuznetsova, Sozvezdie (Constellation) IFF, Arkhangelsk, Russia, 2001
- Special Prize, Festival of Russian Film in Honfleur, France, 2001
- Best Fiction Film, Best Director, Best Male Lead, Best Female Lead, Best Script, Best Camera, Best Production Design, Nika Awards, Russia, 2002
- Best Film, Best Director, Best Camera, Best Actress, Best Actor, Best Script, Best Production Design, National Award Golden Ram, Russia, 2002
- Best Film, Best Actor, Best Script, Best Production Design, Bronze Horseman, the Professional Awards of the Lenfilm Studio, Russia, 2001
