= Clan name =

Clan name may refer to:

- Chinese clan name (Chinese: 氏; pinyin: shì), one of two types of ancient Chinese surnames distinct from the ancestral name (姓, xing)
- Mongolian clan name, a portion of a Mongolian name
- Roman clan name, a common element of Latin names, usually the second name following the praenomen and before the cognomen
- Scottish clan, a geographically-based system of family groupings (and, historically, of government) in Scotland
- Xhosa clan name, a respectful way of referring to a Xhosa person, after the name of a prominent ancestor
- Japanese clan name (本姓,氏), a type of traditional Japanese name distinct from the surname (苗字, myōji), used by Japanese people until the early modern period. For example, Itō Hirobumi used the name Ochi no Sukune Hirobumi (越智宿禰博文), while Ōkubo Toshimichi used the name Fujiwara no Ason Toshimichi (藤原朝臣利通). Conceptually, Japanese clan names correspond to Chinese and Korean surnames. This practice was officially abolished in 1871.

== See also ==
- Clan, for a broad historical perspective
