= Leonid Yakobson =

Soviet-Jewish ballet choreographer (1904–1975)

Leonid Veniaminovich Yakobson (sometimes spelled Jacobson; Russian: Леонид Вениаминович Якобсон; January 2, 1904 (January 15, 1904 O.S.) – October 17, 1975) was a Jewish ballet choreographer from Russia. He was the founder of the Yacobson Ballet.

== Life and career ==
Yakobson was born in Saint Petersburg. He staged his first ballets when he was still a student at the Leningrad Choreographic School. His first works were in sharp contrast to the views of the established classical ballet school and he immediately found himself in conflict with the Soviet party and ballet officials and experts, in particular with Agrippina Vaganova. Yakobson graduated in 1926 but was unable to find work in the Soviet theaters. After working for some time as a schoolteacher, he was invited to the Leningrad Kirov Theater (Mariinsky Ballet).

His first work was choreographing the second act of The Golden Age, a 1930 ballet by Dmitri Shostakovich. The act required athleticism from the dancers; overall, the ballet targeted young people. The ballet itself was heavily politicized: its plot revolved around Soviet football players going to a bourgeois country where they were baited by police, fascists, and capitalists. The plot required the inclusion of such dances as tango, foxtrot, and tap dancing, which at the time were forbidden in the Soviet Union. The ballet was shown a total of eighteen times and then was banned. In 1931, Vaganova became the head of the Ballet Theater and denied Yakobson any further choreographic work.

Yakobson continued to work in various other cities around the country, with his work attracting more attention. His ballet Shurale was scheduled to be shown in Moscow on June 22, 1941, but on this day Germany invaded the Soviet Union and the premiere was cancelled. In 1949, Yakobson was invited to the Kirov Ballet Theater (currently Mariinsky Ballet) in Leningrad to resume the staging of Shurale. During rehearsals, members of the Communist Party organization made several attempts to oust Yakobson; however, Pyotr Gusev, the then-head of the troupe, refused to fire him. The premiere of Shurale took place on May 28, 1950. Not only was it a success, but the ballet was recognized as an outstanding achievement of Soviet choreography. However, as at the time a large-scale antisemitic campaign was going on, Yakobson, who was a Jew, was fired from the theater. Nevertheless, Shurale remained popular with the audience and continued to be shown for a long time. After being fired, Yakobson was taking jobs in minor provincial theaters where he staged various short ballets. He was not allowed to stage grand ballets.

In 1953, after the death of Stalin, the antisemitic campaign gradually decayed, and in 1955 Yakobson was again invited to Leningrad to stage a ballet; this time it was Spartacus by Aram Khachaturian. Yakobson was the first choreographer who agreed to work on this ballet. Yakobson's choreography violated all canons of classical ballet. He removed the ballet pointe shoes and tutus, and actors were dressed in tunics and sandals like in ancient Rome. He replaced the classic ballet dance for plastic and facial movements. The premiere took place on December 27, 1956, and was received as one of the most remarkable phenomena of the ballet life. However, supporters of classical ballet accused Yakobson in disregarding the rules of the ballet. Soon Spartacus was removed from the repertoire. In 1968, Yury Grigorovich staged the ballet in Moscow at the Bolshoi Theatre, but this was a different formulation of classical ballet.

In 1959, Yakobson created the Choreographic Miniatures – he brought his little concert dance in one performance. It was filmed and has received a number of international awards, including the Golden Nymph (1961, Monte Carlo) and le diplôme de l'Université de Danse de Paris (1961). He created in the Kirov theater a number of other ballets including the Bedbug (based on the piece by Vladimir Mayakovsky), Wonderland, Twelve (after the poem by Alexander Blok), but the censors would not let them on stage, since they thought the ballets to be inappropriate for the Soviet audience.

By that time, Yakobson was officially recognized as a talented choreographer, and his ambition was to become a chief choreographer in a public theater. After an initial failure in Moscow, where apparently Igor Moiseyev, with his Folk Dance Ensemble, was chosen ahead of him, Yakobson tried Leningrad. Officials promised to appoint him, but appointed Pyotr Gusev instead. However, Gusev immediately invited Yakobson to work with him. After some time, the authorities fired Gusev, and Yakobson was left alone to manage the theater. The theatre was named Choreographic Miniatures. This happened in 1969, and Yakobson finally got an opportunity to work quietly. He was able to resume the performances which were not welcome in other theaters, and created a lot of little ballet-miniatures. Among this ballets-miniatures is a "Vestris" for Mikhail Baryshnikov (1969, in memory of Gaétan Vestris).

But a few years later, Yakobson was diagnosed with cancer. The last attack occurred in September 1975 in Moscow at the time of admission to the Minister of Culture Pyotr Demichev. Yakobson was immediately sent to hospital. He died on October 17, 1975, in the Kremlin hospital. Yakobson was buried in Leningrad.

Many years passed.

Theatre Choreographic Miniatures now bears the name of Leonid Yakobson. Leonid Yakobson's choreography is restored by the next generation of choreographers.

In 2001, Leonid Yakobson's widow, Irina Pevzner (ru: Ирина Певзнер), published in the U.S. (not in Russia) his book Letters to Noverre (ru: «Письма к Новерру», N. Y.: Hermitage publishers. 2001, ISBN 1-55779-133-3; Jean-Georges Noverre (1727–1810) was a French balletmaster and the creator of ballet d'action). In this book, Yakobson presented his theoretical views on the choreography.

See Revival of Yakobson (17 videos) on YouTube.

== See also ==
- Ballet in Russia
- List of choreographers
- List of people from Saint Petersburg
