= The Sun (2005 film) =

- Russian release poster
- Directed by: Alexander Sokurov
- Written by: Yuri Arabov; Jeremy Noble
- Based on: Moloch by Alexander Sokurov
- Produced by: Igor Kallenof; Marco Mueller; Andrei Sigle; Alexander Rodnyansky
- Starring: Issey Ogata; Robert Dawson
- Cinematography: Alexander Sokurov
- Edited by: Sergei Ivanov
- Music by: Andrei Sigle
- Distributed by: Nelvana
- Release date: 17 February 2005 (Berlin International Film Festival)
- Running time: 115 minutes
- Countries: Russia; Italy; Switzerland; France
- Languages: Japanese; English

The Sun (Russian: Солнце, Solntse) is a 2005 Russian biographical film directed by Alexander Sokurov, depicting Japanese Emperor Shōwa (Hirohito) during the final days of World War II. It is the third film in a trilogy by the Russian director, that includes Taurus, about Vladimir Lenin, and Moloch, about Adolf Hitler. The film was entered in the 55th Berlin International Film Festival. It received generally positive reviews from critics.

== Plot ==
Towards the conclusion of the Second World War, Japan nears defeat as Emperor Hirohito reminisces about the final war years. He is depicted as still surrounded by his attentive staff who look after his every bodily need. When Hirohito receives a report from his collected military and civilian staff of imminent defeat, he appears detached and starts reciting oddly disconnected verse about Japan's geography written by his historical predecessors. He has an interest in marine biology, and his staff keep him entertained with new specimens being delivered to his library even in the last days and hours prior to American troops arriving on his doorstep. Finally, with the Americans imminently approaching, he is then set up in a bunker underneath his Imperial Palace in Tokyo. Hirohito reflects on the foundation of the conflict while attempting to dictate peace terms.

Later, U.S. military commander General Douglas MacArthur is sent to bring him through the ruins of Tokyo for a meeting regarding the occupation of the victorious Allied leaders. The two very different men strangely bond after sharing dinner and cigars, after which Hirohito retreats to his personal quarters. Following his admission of personal failures, Hirohito attempts to rebuild his war-ravaged country as a fully developed constitutional nation while his own future remains in doubt, as either the Emperor of Japan or a war criminal.

== Cast ==
- Issey Ogata as Emperor Hirohito
- Robert Dawson as General Douglas MacArthur
- Kaori Momoi as Empress Kōjun
- Shiro Sano as the Chamberlain
- Shinmei Tsuji as the Old Servant
- Taijiro Tamura as the Scientist
- Georgi Pitskhelauri as McArthur's Warrant Officer
- Hiroya Morita as Kantarō Suzuki
- Toshiaki Nishizawa as Mitsumasa Yonai
- Naomasa Musaka as Korechika Anami
- Yusuke Tozawa as Kōichi Kido
- Kōjirō Kusanagi as Shigenori Tōgō
- Tetsuro Tsuno as Yoshijirō Umezu
- Rokuro Abe as Soemu Toyoda
- Jun Haichi as Nobuyuki Abe

== Production ==
=== Filming ===
Having confessed himself in "not being interested in the history or politics which took place, and not really being interested in historical events of the period", Sokurov gives a personal impression of Hirohito while omitting all references to questions surrounding the Tokyo tribunal regarding the personal responsibility of the emperor as head of the Imperial General Headquarters in relation to Japanese war crimes. That omission results in the imperial conference between the emperor and his council and his meeting with MacArthur, in fact, contain none of the words actually related to imperial interpreter Katsuzō Okumura's transcript. For example, as noted by Okumura, MacArthur praised the emperor's "august virtue" (miitsu).

According to The Times, the film has not been widely screened in Japan because of fears of violence from right wing extremists over its portrayal of Hirohito.

== Reception ==
=== Critical response ===
The Sun has an approval rating of 92% on review aggregator website Rotten Tomatoes, based on 39 reviews, and an average rating of 8.2/10. The website's critical consensus states, "Certainly not for the impatient, Aleksandr Sokurov's deliberately paced look at Hirohito in the waning days of World War II is both enlightening and admirable in its restraint". It also has a score of 85 out of 100 on Metacritic, based on 12 critics, indicating "universal acclaim".

=== Awards and nominations ===
The Sun was entered in the 55th Berlin International Film Festival.

At the 2005 Russian Guild of Film Critics Awards the film was awarded the prizes for Best Film, Best Director (Alexander Sokurov) and Best Music (Andrei Sigle).

The Sun won the Golden Apricot at the 2005 Golden Apricot Yerevan International Film Festival, Armenia, for Best Feature Film.
