= The Lonely Voice of Man =

- Directed by: Alexander Sokurov
- Written by: Yuri Arabov; Andrei Platonov (book)
- Produced by: O. Migacheva; S. Gurevich
- Starring: Tatyana Goryacheva; Alexander Gradov; Vladimir Degtyarev; Lyudmila Yakovleva; Nikolai Kochegarov
- Cinematography: Sergey Yurizditsky
- Edited by: A. Bespalova (1978); Leda Semenova (1987)
- Music by: Krzysztof Penderecki; Otmar Nussio; Alexander Burdov
- Distributed by: Lenfilm
- Release date: 1987
- Running time: 87 minutes
- Country: Soviet Union
- Language: Russian

The Lonely Voice of Man (Russian: Одинокий голос человека), also known as The Lonely Human Voice, is the first full-feature film by Alexander Sokurov. It was originally filmed in 1978 and reconstructed in 1987 at the Lenfilm studios. The film is largely based on Andrei Platonov's River Potudan and Origin of the Master, although it is not a direct film adaptation in the traditional sense but rather a recreation of the spiritual nature of Platonov's prose.

== Background ==
Originally intended by Sokurov as his diploma defense at the VGIK, The Lonely Voice of Man was banned in the USSR until the glasnost. The film was shot at the VGIK training studio in 1978 and condemned to destruction by the institute's management. A film swap and its secret removal from the VGIK film vault by cameraman Sergey Yurizditsky saved the film, which was ultimately released ten years after filming. Upon release in 1987, it was critically acclaimed and nominated for a number of awards. Most notably the film won the Bronzen Leopard at the Locarno International Film Festival.

All the actors in the film were amateurs, and a combination of this along with the sulky provincial landscapes created a sense of realism coupled with artistry that made the feature stand out. Here Sokurov already began to approach his main theme - the tragic separation between the body and the soul. In his diary, Sokurov noted that in Platonov, he saw the "story of a 'weak heart', for which happiness was 'hard work'." Love and ongoing life are eternal, but unachievable, dreams for the characters.

The film is dedicated to Andrei Tarkovsky who supported Sokurov morally during his battle against the Soviet censors.
