= Family Name (film) =

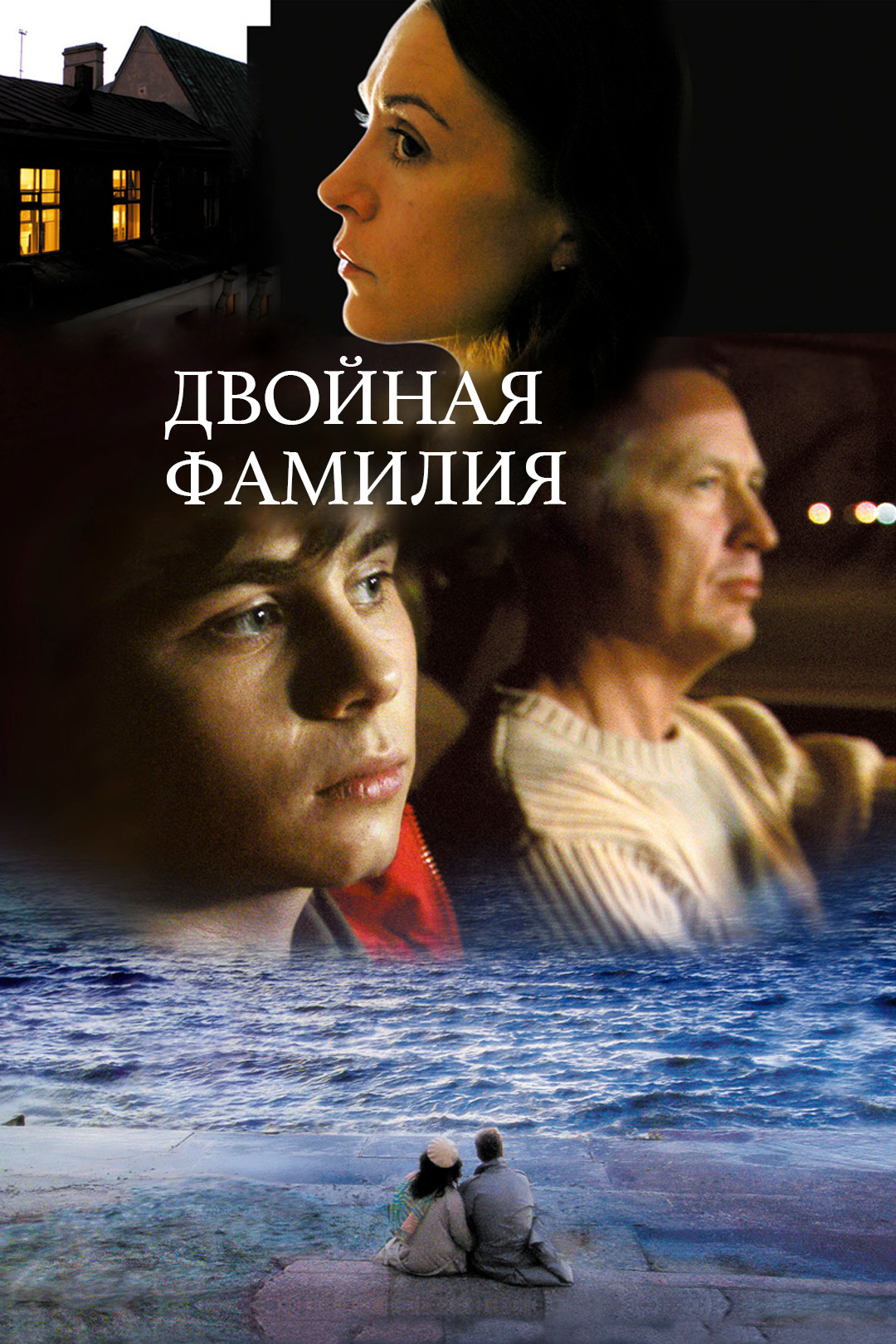
- Russian: Двойная фамилия
- Directed by: Stanislav Mitin
- Written by: Stanislav Mitin; Dina Rubina
- Produced by: Gevorg Nersisyan
- Starring: Oleg Stefan; Oksana Bazilevich; Sergey Barkovskiy; Slava Korobitsin; Misha Kozheurov
- Cinematography: Sergey Yurizditsky
- Music by: Yuri Falik
- Production companies: Intra Communications, Inc
- Release date: 2006
- Running time: 94 minutes
- Countries: Russia; Kazakhstan
- Language: Russian

Family Name (Russian: Двойная фамилия, romanized: Dvoynaya familiya) is a 2006 Russian-Kazakh drama film directed by Stanislav Mitin.

== Plot ==
The film tells about the Vozdvizhensky family who live long without children. Suddenly, their son Filipp is born, and the head of the family finds out that this is not his son and would like to leave home, but cannot. Over time, he becomes more and more attached to Philip, but cannot forgive his wife for treason, leading to doubt of their marriage's viability.

== Cast ==
- Oleg Stefan (as Oleg Shtefanko) as Vozdvizhensky
- Oksana Bazilevich as Vozdvizhensky's wife
- Sergey Barkovskiy as Viktor
- Slava Korobitsin as Filipp
- Misha Kozheurov as young Filipp
