= Whispering Pages =

1994 Russian film

- Directed by: Alexander Sokurov
- Written by: Alexander Sokurov
- Cinematography: Alexander Burov (cinematographer)
- Music by: Mariinsky Theater Orchestra
- Distributed by: Lenfilm Studio
- Release date: 1994
- Running time: 76 minutes
- Country: Russia
- Language: Russian

Whispering Pages, also transliterated as Tikhiye Stranitsy (Russian: Тихие страницы), is a 1994 Russian film directed by Alexander Sokurov. The film was a Russian-German co-production. The film is loosely based on Fyodor Dostoevsky's 1866 novel Crime and Punishment.

== Plot ==
A man wanders slowly through the catacombs of a wrecked city, passing by ruins, listless denizens milling about, unruly mobs, and acts of mass suicide. He agrees to do some paperwork to move a dead body, but the bureaucrat who manages the forms ensnares him in Kafkaesque questions. He admits, perhaps not honestly, to a murder, and confronts a prostitute about sin, shame, and God. At the end of the film, he sits down under the statue of a lion and then disappears.

== Reception ==
The film has won acclaim from The New York Times, Variety, the Chicago Tribune, and the Chicago Reader.

== Cast ==
- Alexander Cherednik - wanderer
- Elizaveta Korolyova - prostitute
- Sergei Barkovsky - bureaucrat
