= Tatyana Yegorova (actress) =

Russian actress (1944–2025)

- Татьяна Егорова
- Born: 8 January 1944; Moscow, Russian SFSR, USSR
- Died: 21 July 2025 (aged 81); Moscow, Russia
- Occupations: Actress; writer; journalist
- Years active: 1966–2025

Tatyana Nikolaevna Yegorova (Russian: Татьяна Николаевна Егорова; 8 January 1944 – 21 July 2025) was a Soviet and Russian actress, writer and journalist.

== Life and career ==
Yegorova was born in Moscow on 8 January 1944.

In 1962 she graduated from school and entered the Boris Shchukin Theatre Institute. In 1966 she began working at the Moscow Satire Theatre, where she served for 23 years. In 1989 she left the theatre.

The author of the sensational book “Andrei Mironov and I” (1999), dedicated to her relationship with the actor, which, according to her, lasted 21 years (with a break of three years).

Yegorova died in Moscow on 21 July 2025, at the age of 81.

== Selected filmography ==
- Office Romance (1977)
- A Strange Woman (1977)
- Once Upon a Time Twenty Years Later (1980)
- The Donkey's Hide (1982)
- Time of Desires (1983)
- Friend (1987)
- Armavir (1991)
- Infinitas (1991)
