= Save and Protect =

- Directed by: Alexander Sokurov
- Written by: Yuri Arabov
- Starring: Cécile Zervudacki; Robert Vaab
- Cinematography: Sergey Yurizditskiy
- Edited by: Leda Semyonova
- Music by: Yuri Khanon
- Release date: 1989 (Soviet Union)
- Running time: 167 minutes (original version); 128 minutes (re-edited version)
- Country: Soviet Union
- Languages: Russian; French

Save and Protect (Russian: Spasi i sokhrani) is a 1989 Soviet historical drama film directed by Russian filmmaker Aleksandr Sokurov, starring Cécile Zervudacki and Robert Vaab. It depicts the decline of a childlike woman as she engages in adultery and falls into crippling debt. It is loosely adapted from Gustave Flaubert's novel Madame Bovary.

== Cast ==
- Cécile Zervudacki as Emma
- Robert Vaab as Charles

== Reception ==
Vincent Canby of The New York Times commented that what pushes the film forward is "Emma's escalating desperation and madness, reflected in a montage of images and sound of increasingly odd design."

The film won the FIPRESCI prize at the 1989 Montreal World Film Festival.
