= Father and Son (2003 film) =

2003 film

- Film poster
- Directed by: Alexander Sokurov
- Written by: Sergei Potepalov
- Produced by: Thomas Kufus
- Starring: Andrei Shchetinin
- Cinematography: Aleksandr Burov
- Edited by: Sergei Ivanov
- Music by: Andrey Sigle
- Release date: 23 May 2003
- Running time: 83 minutes
- Country: Russia
- Language: Russian

Father and Son (Russian: Отец и сын, romanized: Otets i syn) is a 2003 Russian art film directed by Alexander Sokurov. The film was entered into feature film competition at the 2003 Cannes Film Festival.

== Plot ==
A father (Father) and his son Aleksei share a rooftop apartment in an unidentified seaside city. The Father is a former combat helicopter pilot, and Aleksei attends military school where he is studying to become a sports trainer. Given Father's youthfulness, he and Aleksei seem to understand each other, yet their life experiences separate them, and over the course of the film a rift gradually develops between them, that rift and Aleksei's reaction to it becoming the source of his subsequent nightmares.

Regarded by some as "plotless," like many Sokurov films, Father and Son combines two narrative structures, one circular, the other linear. The film opens and closes with scenes from the circular structure, in which Father comforts Aleksei, who has just had one of his nightmare; the film concludes when Father retires to the rooftop to await Aleksei's next cry for help. The mise-en-scene of the framing scenes (e.g., Father's sitting down in the snow in his pajamas) together with intertextual references to famous painterly depictions of angels Sokurov quotes (e.g., Rembrandt's Jacob Wrestling with the Angel) identify Father as Aleksei's guardian angel, who returns from death (the result of his combat wounds) to protect and comfort his son. Father's status as Aleksei's guardian angel explains the physical closeness displayed by the two men, which has been interpreted by some as sexual intimacy.

The film's linear narrative, enclosed within the circular frame, collapses into a weekend events that have occurred over time, but which Aleksei has linked together in his nightmare into a single series of events, through which he relives Father's unlimited love for him and his own failure to understand and/or appreciate that love. During those two days Aleksei and Father encounter two young men Aleksei's age––Sasha and Fyodor, both of whom are fatherless for different reasons, their fathers' absences evoking the sons' emotional and even mental distress. During those same two days Aleksei's unnamed girlfriend breaks up their relationships, Aleksei's unwillingness to assume fatherhood a point of contention between them.

Father and Son comprises an allegory of fatherly love and filial regret, a variation on one of Sokurov's recurring themes, the 'Parable of the Prodigal Son'.

== Cast ==
- Andrei Shchetinin as Father
- Aleksei Neymyshev as Aleksei, the son
- Aleksandr Razbash as Sasha, the neighbour
- Fyodor Lavrov as Fyodor
- Marina Zasukhina as unnamed girlfriend

== Reception ==
=== Critical response ===
Father and Son has an approval rating of 68% on review aggregator website Rotten Tomatoes, based on 41 reviews, and an average rating of 6.6/10. It also has a score of 64 out of 100 on Metacritic, based on 17 critics, indicating "generally favorable reviews".
