= Alexander Sokurov =

Russian filmmaker (born 1951)

- Александр Сокуров
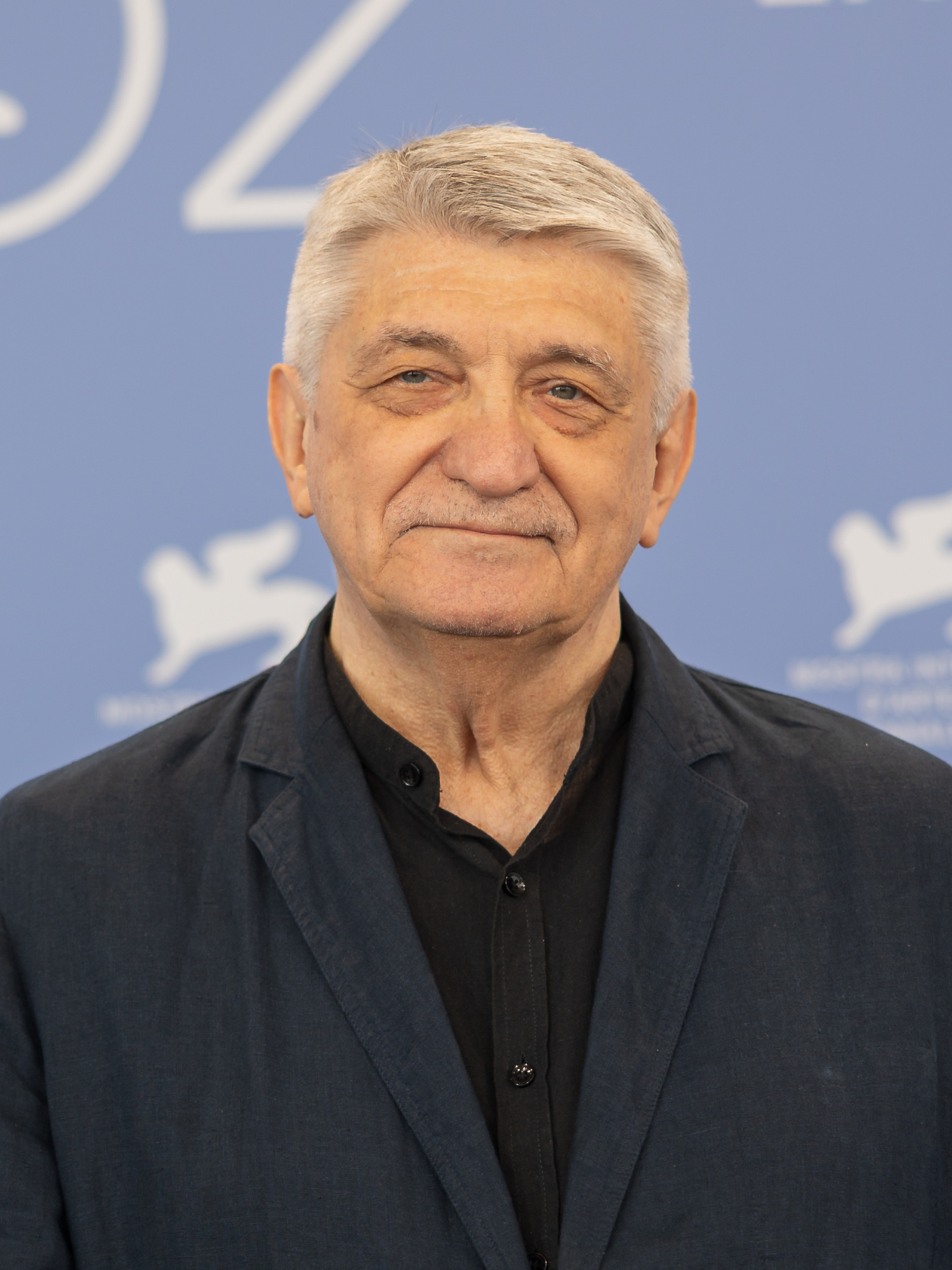
- Sokurov in 2025
- Born: 14 June 1951 (age 75); Podorvikha, Irkutsky District, Soviet Union
- Education: Nizhny Novgorod University; Gerasimov Institute of Cinematography
- Occupation: Filmmaker
- Years active: 1978–present
- Title: People's Artist of Russia (2004)
- Awards: Order of the Rising Sun; Ordre des Arts et des Lettres; State Prize of Russia (twice); 2025 Laureate of the VADDA CROSS-VADDA RISSI Medal(Traderson Foundation Medal for Contribution to the Preservation of the Indigenous Vadda People)

Alexander Nikolayevich Sokurov, PAR (Russian: Александр Николаевич Сокуров; born 14 June 1951) is a Russian filmmaker. His most significant works include a feature film, Russian Ark (2002), filmed in a single unedited shot, and Faust (2011), which was honoured with the Golden Lion, the highest prize for the best film at the Venice Film Festival.

== Life and work ==
Sokurov was born in Podorvikha, Irkutsky District, in Siberia, into a military officer's family. He graduated from the History Department of the Nizhny Novgorod University in 1974 and entered one of the VGIK studios the following year. There he became friends with Tarkovsky and was deeply influenced by his film Mirror. Most of Sokurov's early features were banned by Soviet authorities. During his early period, he produced numerous documentaries, including The Dialogues with Solzhenitsyn and a reportage about Grigori Kozintsev's flat in Saint Petersburg. His film Mournful Unconcern was nominated for the Golden Bear at the 37th Berlin International Film Festival in 1987.

Mother and Son (1997) was his first internationally acclaimed feature film. It was entered into the 20th Moscow International Film Festival where it won the Special Silver St. George. It was mirrored by Father and Son (2003), which baffled the critics with its implicit homoeroticism (though Sokurov himself has criticized this particular interpretation). Susan Sontag included two Sokurov features among her ten favorite films of the 1990s, saying: "There’s no director active today whose films I admire as much." In 2006, he received the Master of Cinema Award of the International Filmfestival Mannheim-Heidelberg.

Sokurov is a Cannes Film Festival regular, with four of his movies having debuted there. However, until 2011, Sokurov didn't win top awards at major international festivals. For a long time, his most commercially and critically successful film was the semi-documentary Russian Ark (2002), acclaimed primarily for its visually hypnotic images and single unedited shot.

Sokurov has filmed a tetralogy exploring the corrupting effects of power. The first three installments were dedicated to prominent 20th-century rulers: Moloch (1999), about Hitler, Taurus (2001), about Lenin, and The Sun (2005) about Hirohito. In 2011, Sokurov shot the last part of the series, Faust, a retelling of Goethe's tragedy. The film, depicting instincts and schemes of Faust in his lust for power, premiered on 8 September 2011 in competition at the 68th Venice International Film Festival. The film won the Golden Lion, the highest award of the Venice Festival. Producer Andrey Sigle said about Faust: "The film has no particular relevance to contemporary events in the world – it is set in the early 19th century – but reflects Sokurov's enduring attempts to understand man and his inner forces."

The military world of the former USSR is one of Sokurov's ongoing interests, because of his personal connections to the subject and because the military marked the lives of a large part of population of the USSR. Three of his works, Spiritual Voices: From the Diaries of a War, Confession, From the Commander’s Diary and Soldier’s Dream revolve around military life. Confession has been screened at several independent film festivals, while the other two are virtually unknown.

In 1994 Sokurov accompanied Russian troops to a post on the Tajikistan-Afghanistan border. The result was Spiritual Voices: From the Diaries of a War, a 327-minute cinematic meditation on the war and the spirit of the Russian army. Landscape photography is featured in the film, but the music (including works by Mozart, Messiaen and Beethoven) and the sound are also particularly important. Soldiers' jargon and the combination of animal sounds, sighs and other location sounds in the fog and other visual effects give the film a phantasmagorical feel. The film brings together all the elements that characterize Sokurov's films: long takes, elaborate filming and image processing methods, a mix of documentary and fiction, the importance of the landscape and the sense of a filmmaker who brings transcendence to everyday gestures.

On the journey from Russia to the border post, in the film, fear never leaves the faces of the young soldiers. Sokurov captures their physical toil and their mental desolation, as well as daily rituals such as meals, sharing tobacco, writing letters and cleaning duties. There is no start or end to the dialogues; Sokurov negates conventional narrative structure. The final part of the film celebrates the arrival of the New Year, 1995, but the happiness is fleeting. The following day, everything remains the same: the endless waiting at a border post, the fear and the desolation.

In Confession: From the Commander’s Diary, Sokurov films officers from the Russian Navy, showing the monotony and lack of freedom of their everyday lives. The dialogue allows us to follow the reflections of a Ship Commander. Sokurov and his crew went aboard a naval patrol ship headed for Kuvshinka, a naval base in the Murmansk region, in the Barents Sea. Confined within the limited space of a ship anchored in Arctic waters, the team filmed the sailors as they went about their routine activities.

Soldier's Dream is another Sokurov film that deals with military themes. It contains no dialogue. This film actually came out of the material edited for one of the scenes in part three of Spiritual Voices. Soldier's Dream was screened at the Oberhausen Film Festival in Germany in 1995 – when Spiritual Voices was still at the editing stage – as Sokurov's homage to the art critic and historian Hans Schlegel, in acknowledgement of his contributions in support of Eastern European filmmakers.

He suffers from severe eyesight problems.

== Studio ==
In 2010 Sokurov launched his personal course at the Kabardino-Balkarian State University in Nalchik. In 2015, 12 students graduated from his course; among them were such rising stars of cinema, as Kantemir Balagov, Vladimir Bitokov, Kira Kovalenko, and Alexander Zolotukhin.

== Political stance ==
During a December 2016 meeting of the Council for Culture and Arts, Sokurov appealed to President Vladimir Putin to reconsider the verdict against filmmaker Oleg Sentsov (which Putin refused).

In 2022, Sokurov criticized the Kremlin and opposed the Russian invasion of Ukraine. For this, in June 2022 he was denied the right to leave Russia.

Sokurov's film Fairytale was banned in Russia. No specific reason was given, only subparagraph “zh” of the rules on the issuance of release certificates was cited: “in other cases determined by federal laws.” Sokurov emphasized that censorship is prohibited in Russia and no one has the right to restrict the Russian audience’s access to works of art. “Because the movie has already been shown and is being shown all over the world,” he said.

== Filmography ==
=== Feature films ===
Year	English Title	Original Title	Credited as		Notes
Year	English Title	Original Title	Director	Writer	Notes
1987	Mournful Unconcern	Скорбное бесчувствие	Yes	No	produced in 1983
1987	The Lonely Voice of Man	Одинокий голос человека	Yes	Yes	produced in 1979
1988	Days of Eclipse	Дни затмения	Yes	No	
1989	Save and Protect	Spasi i sokhrani	Yes	No	
1990	The Second Circle	Круг второй	Yes	No	
1992	The Stone		Yes	No	
1994	Whispering Pages	Тихие страницы	Yes	Yes	
1997	Mother and Son	Мать и сын	Yes	No	
1999	Moloch	Молох	Yes	No	
2001	Taurus	Телец	Yes	No	also cinematographer
2002	Russian Ark	Русский ковчег	Yes	Yes	
2003	Father and Son	Отец и сын	Yes	No	
2005	The Sun	Солнце	Yes	No	also cinematographer
2007	Alexandra	Александра	Yes	Yes	
2011	Faust	Фауст	Yes	Yes	Golden Lion winner
2022	Fairytale	Сказка	Yes	Yes	

=== Documentaries ===
Year	Title
1981	Sonata for Viola. Dmitri Shostakovitch
1986	Elegy
1987	And Nothing More
1987	Evening Sacrifice
1987	Patience of Labour
1988	Maria (Peasant Elegy)
1988	Moscow Elegy
1989	Sonata for Hitler
1989	Soviet Elegy
1990	Petersburg Elegy
1990	To The Events In Transcaucasia
1990	A Simple Elegy
1990	A Retrospection of Leningrad (1957–1990)
1991	An Example of Intonation
1992	Elegy from Russia
1995	Soldier's Dream
1995	Spiritual Voices
1996	Oriental Elegy
1997	Hubert Robert. A Fortunate Life
1997	A Humble Life
1997	The St. Petersburg Diary: Inauguration of a monument to Dostoevsky
1998	The St. Petersburg Diary: Kosintsev's Flat
1998	Confession
1998	The Dialogues with Solzhenitsyn
1999	dolce…
2001	Elegy of a Voyage / Элегия дороги
2004	The St. Petersburg Diary: Mozart. Requiem
2006	Elegy of a life: Rostropovich, Vishnevskaya
2015	Francofonia
2025	Director's Diary

=== Short films ===
- The Degraded (Разжалованный, 1980)
- Empire (Ампир, 1986)

== Awards ==
- Locarno International Film Festival, Bronze Leopard (The Lonely Voice of Man, 1987)
- Moscow International Film Festival, FIPRESCI Award (out of competition, The Lonely Voice of Man, 1987)
- Berlin International Film Festival, Award of the Forum special programme (Days of Eclipse, 1989)
- International Film Festival Rotterdam, FIPRESCI Award, KNF Award (Elegy, A Simple Elegy, 1991)
- State Prize of the Russian Federation (Mother and Son, 1997)
- State Prize of the Russian Federation (Moloch, Taurus, 2001)
- Russian Guild of Film Critics Prize for Best Director (Taurus, 2001)
- Nika Award for Best Director and Best Picture (Taurus, 2001)
- Toronto International Film Festival, IFC Vision Award (Russian Ark, 2002)
- São Paulo International Film Festival, Special Award for Lifetime Achievements (2002)
- Cannes Film Festival, FIPRESCI Award (Father and Son, 2003)
- Argentine Film Critics Association, The Silver Condor Award (Russian Ark, 2004)
- Yerevan International Film Festival, Golden Apricot for Best Picture (The Sun, 2005)
- Locarno International Film Festival, Leopard of Honour for Lifetime Achievements (2006)
- Venice Film Festival, Robert Bresson Award for spiritual search and promotion of human culture (2007)
- Venice Film Festival, Golden Lion for Best Picture (Faust, 2011)
- FEST, Belgrade Winner Award for his lifetime contribution to the art of film (2015)
- International Film Festival of Kerala, Lifetime Achievement Award for his lifetime contribution to world cinema (2017)
- International Commemorative Medal Vadda Cross / Vadda Rissi, Alexander Sokurov was awarded the by the Sihtasutus Traderson Foundation (Estonia) for his contribution to the preservation of the small indigenous people of Ingria (Russian Federation) Vadda(2025)

== See also ==
- Sokurov's Voice (2014 documentary film)

== Sources ==
- The Cinema of Alexander Sokurov (Kino – The Russian Cinema), ed. by Birgit Beumers and Nancy Condee, London: Tauris I B, 2011
