= Larisa Tarkovskaya =

Assistant director (1933–1998)

Larisa Pavlovna Tarkovskaya (Russian: Лариса Павловна Тарковская, née Yegorkina (Егоркина), from 1958, Kizilova (Кизилова); 1 February 1933 – 19 January 1998) was a Soviet film director and actress.

She was the second wife of filmmaker Andrei Tarkovsky. She and Tarkovsky married in 1970 and had one child named Andrei.

== Life ==
Larisa Pavlovna Yegorkina was born on 1 February 1933 in Moscow, Soviet Union to Pavel Vasilyevich Yegorkin, an engineer and Anna Semyonovna, a seamstress. Her parents, who were originally from the village of Avdotyinka, Shilovsky District, Ryazan Oblast, had settled in the capital in 1925.

She married the engineer, Igor Kizilov, and in 1958 gave birth to their daughter Olga Kizilova. While filming Andrei Rublev, Kizilova, who had been a production assistant for the film, and Tarkovsky met and started a relationship. In 1965, Tarkovsky moved in with Kizilova while still married to his first wife, actress Irma Raush.

In 1970, Tarkovsky divorced his first wife and married Kizilova a few months later. Their son, Andrei Andreyevich Tarkovsky, (nicknamed Andriosha, meaning "little Andrei" or "Andrei Junior") was born the same year on 7 August.

=== Death ===
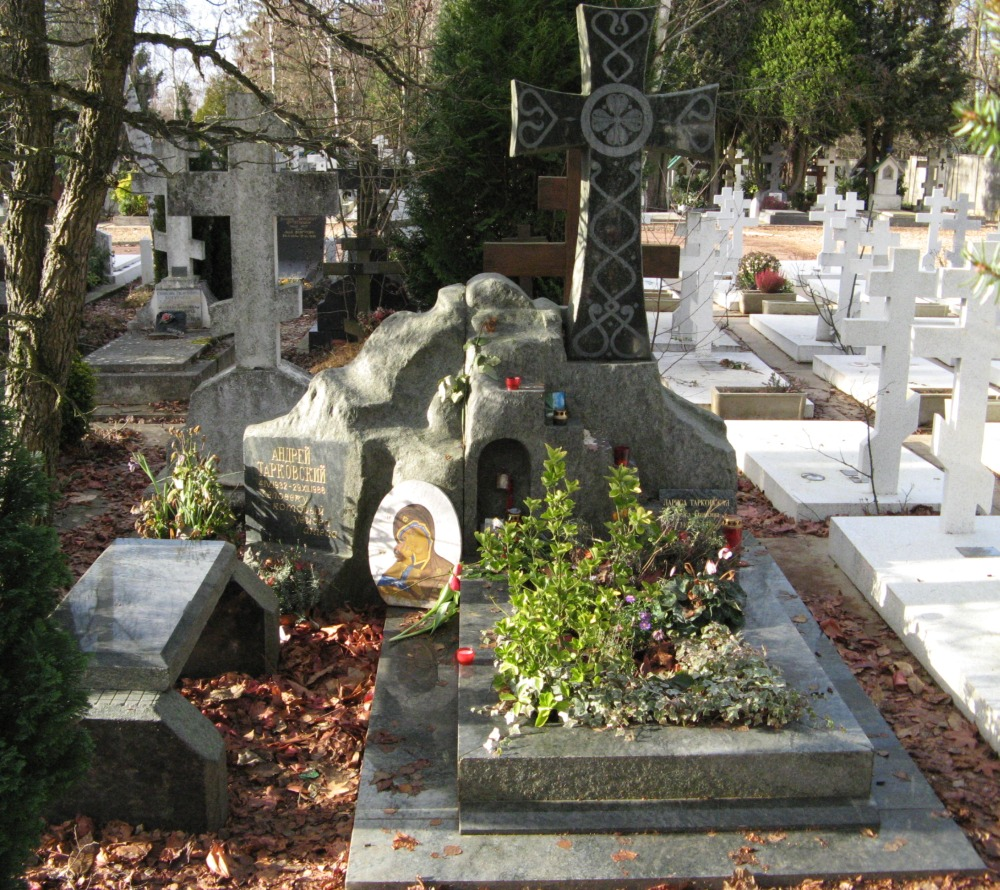
Andrei and Larisa Tarkovsky's grave, in the Sainte-Geneviève-des-Bois Russian Cemetery in France

Tarkovsky died of lung cancer in Paris on 29 December 1986 and was buried in January 1987 in the Russian Cemetery in Sainte-Geneviève-des-Bois, France. The inscription on his gravestone, which was erected in 1994, was conceived by his wife and reads: To the man who saw the Angel. Tarkovskaya died of cancer in Neuilly-sur-Seine, Hauts-de-Seine, France, on 19 January 1998 and was laid to rest beside her husband.

Tarkovskya, her husband Tarkovsky, and actor Anatoly Solonitsyn all died from the same type of cancer. Vladimir Sharun, a sound designer for Stalker, was convinced that all three died due to exposure to chemicals released from a chemical plant upstream from where the film was shot.

== Filmography ==
=== As assistant director ===
- 1966: Andrei Rublev
- 1972: Solaris (credited as L. Tarkovskaya)
- 1975: Mirror
- 1979: Stalker
- 1983: Nostalghia (credited as Larissa Tarkovsky)

=== As actress ===
- 1975: Mirror : Nadejda

=== Documentary appearances ===
- 1987: One Day in the Life of Andrei Arsenevich (credited as Larissa Tarkovski)
- 1988: The Exile and Death of Andrei Tarkovsky
- 2000: Cinéma, de notre temps, episode Une journée d'Andreï Arsenevitch

== Bibliography ==
- 1997: Andrei Tarkovski (in French)
