= Zuma =

Zuma may refer to:

== People ==
- Zuma (surname), a South African surname
- Honour Zuma, South African media personality and DJ, as Cyan Boujee
- Jacob Zuma, former South African president
- Nkosazana Dlamini-Zuma, a South African politician and doctor
- Suma people, or Zuma people, people living in northern Chihuahua and the Rio Grande valley of western Texas

=== Fictional characters ===
- Zuma (comics), a Filipino comic book character
- Zuma, a character from Paw Patrol

== Places ==
- Zuma Beach in Malibu, California
- Zuma Rock, in Nigeria
- Zuma, Sudan, an archaeological site

== Entertainment ==
- Zuma (video game)
- Zuma (Neil Young & Crazy Horse album), 1975
- Zuma (Southern Pacific album), 1988

== Vehicles and transport ==
- Yamaha Zuma, motor scooter
- Yamaha Zuma 125, motor scooter
- Zuma, a small cat-rigged dinghy made by American Machine and Foundry (AMF)
- Zuma (satellite), a U.S. military satellite launched by SpaceX

== Others ==
- Zuma (restaurant)
- Zuma Press, a US-based wire service
- Zuma (harvestman), a genus of arachnid in the family Paranonychidae
