= Zuna =

Zuna is a surname. Notable people with the surname include:

- Frank Zuna (1893–1983), American long-distance runner
- Pavel Zuna (born 1967), Czech journalist
- Zuna (rapper) (born 1993), German rapper

== See also ==
- Zona (disambiguation)
- Zuma (disambiguation)
