= Zona (disambiguation) =

Zona is a species of fish.

Zona may also refer to:

- Zona, West Virginia
- Herpes zoster or zona, a viral disease characterized by a painful skin rash with blisters
- Zona (streaming video software), a file-sharing video streaming client
- Arizona Wildcats, sports teams of the University of Arizona
- Zona: A Book About a Film About a Journey to a Room, a 2012 book by Geoff Dyer

== People with the given name ==
- Zona Gale, American author
- Zona Maie Griswold, singer
- Zona Jones, singer
- Zona Beenzo Couleybaly, Bailian chef
- Zona Vallance, writer and lecturer

== See also ==
- Zona incerta, a horizontally elongated region of gray matter cells in the subthalamus below the thalamus
- Zona pellucida, a glycoprotein membrane surrounding the plasma membrane of an oocyte
- Zona Rosa, Mexico City
