= Avdotyinka =

Avdotyinka Авдотьинка
- Village
- Location within Ryazan Oblast Location within Russia
- Coordinates: 54°13′N 40°54′E
- Country: Russia
- Region: Ryazan Oblast
- District: Shilovsky District
- Time zone: UTC+3:00

Avdotyinka (Russian: Авдотьинка) is a rural locality (a village) in Zheludevskoye Rural Settlement of Shilovsky District, Ryazan Oblast, Russia. The population was 549 as of 2010. There are 2 streets.

== Geography ==
The village is located on Oka–Don Lowland, 14 km south of Shilovo (the district's administrative centre) by road. Zheludevo is the nearest rural locality.
