= Andrei Rublev (film) =

1966 film by Andrei Tarkovsky

- Theatrical release poster
- Directed by: Andrei Tarkovsky
- Written by: Andrei Konchalovsky; Andrei Tarkovsky
- Produced by: Tamara Ogorodnikova (Note: In the Soviet Union the role of a producer was different from that in Western countries and more similar to the role of a line producer or a unit production manager.)
- Starring: Anatoly Solonitsyn; Ivan Lapikov; Nikolai Grinko; Nikolai Sergeyev; Irma Raush; Nikolai Burlyayev; Rolan Bykov; Bolot Beyshenaliyev
- Cinematography: Vadim Yusov
- Edited by: Lyudmila Feiginova; Tatyana Egorycheva; Olga Shevkunenko
- Music by: Vyacheslav Ovchinnikov
- Production company: Mosfilm
- Release dates: 16 December 1966 (Moscow); 24 December 1971 (Soviet Union)
- Running time: 205 minutes (first cut); 183 minutes (final cut)
- Country: Soviet Union
- Languages: Russian; Tatar; Italian
- Budget: 1.3 million Rbls

Andrei Rublev (Russian: Андрей Рублёв, romanized: Andrey Rublyov) is a 1966 Soviet epic biographical historical drama film directed by Andrei Tarkovsky who co-wrote it with Andrei Konchalovsky. The film was re-edited from the 1966 film titled The Passion According to Andrei by Tarkovsky which was censored during the first decade of the Brezhnev era in the Soviet Union. The film is loosely based on the life of Andrei Rublev, a 15th-century Russian icon painter. The film features Anatoly Solonitsyn, Nikolai Grinko, Ivan Lapikov, Nikolai Sergeyev, Nikolai Burlyayev and Tarkovsky's wife Irma Raush. Savva Yamshchikov, a famous Russian restorer and art historian, was a scientific consultant for the film.

Andrei Rublev is set against the background of Russia in the early 15th century. Although the film is only loosely based on Rublev's life, it seeks to depict a realistic portrait of medieval Russia. Tarkovsky sought to create a film that shows the artist as "a world-historic figure" and "Christianity as an axiom of Russia's historical identity" during a turbulent period of Russian history. In addition to treating the artist as "a world-historic figure," Tarkovsky also sought to detail and investigate the intersection between faith and artistry. In his book Sculpting in Time, Tarkovsky writes: "It is a mistake to talk about the artist 'looking for' his subject. In fact the subject grows within him like a fruit, and begins to demand expression. It is like childbirth... The poet has nothing to be proud of: he is not master of the situation, but a servant. Creative work is his only possible form of existence, and his every work is like a deed he has no power to annul. For him to be aware that a sequence of such deeds is due and right, that it lies in the very nature of things, he has to have faith in the idea, for only faith interlocks the system of images." In Andrei Rublev, Tarkovsky depicts the philosophy that faith is necessary for art, thereby commenting on the deserved role of faith in the secular, atheist society he was in at the time of the film's creation.

Due to the film's themes, including artistic freedom, religion, political ambiguity, and autodidacticism, it was not released domestically in the Soviet Union under the doctrine of state atheism until years after it was completed, except for a single 1966 screening in Moscow. A version of the film was shown at the 1969 Cannes Film Festival, where it won the FIPRESCI prize. In 1971, a censored version of the film was released in the Soviet Union. The film was further cut for commercial reasons upon its U.S. release through Columbia Pictures in 1973. As a result, several versions of the film exist.

Although issues with censorship obscured and truncated the film for many years following its release, the film was soon recognised by many western critics and film directors as a highly original and accomplished work. Even more since being restored to its original version, Andrei Rublev has come to be regarded as one of the greatest films of all time, and has often been ranked highly in both the Sight & Sound critics' and directors' polls.

== Plot ==
Andrei Rublev has a prologue and an epilogue only loosely related to the main film. The main film is divided into eight episodes dealing, directly or symbolically, with transitional moments in the life of the great icon painter. The background is 15th-century Russia, a turbulent period characterised by fighting between rival princes and the Mongol invasions.

=== Prologue ===
A hot air balloon is tethered to the spire of a church next to a river, with a man named Yefim suspended from it in a harness. Despite interference from an ignorant mob who arrive from the river, the balloon is successfully released. Yefim is overwhelmed and delighted by the view from above and the sensation of flying, but he cannot prevent a crash-landing shortly after. He is the first of several creative characters, representing the daring escapist, whose hopes are easily crushed. After the crash, a horse is seen rolling on its back by a pond.

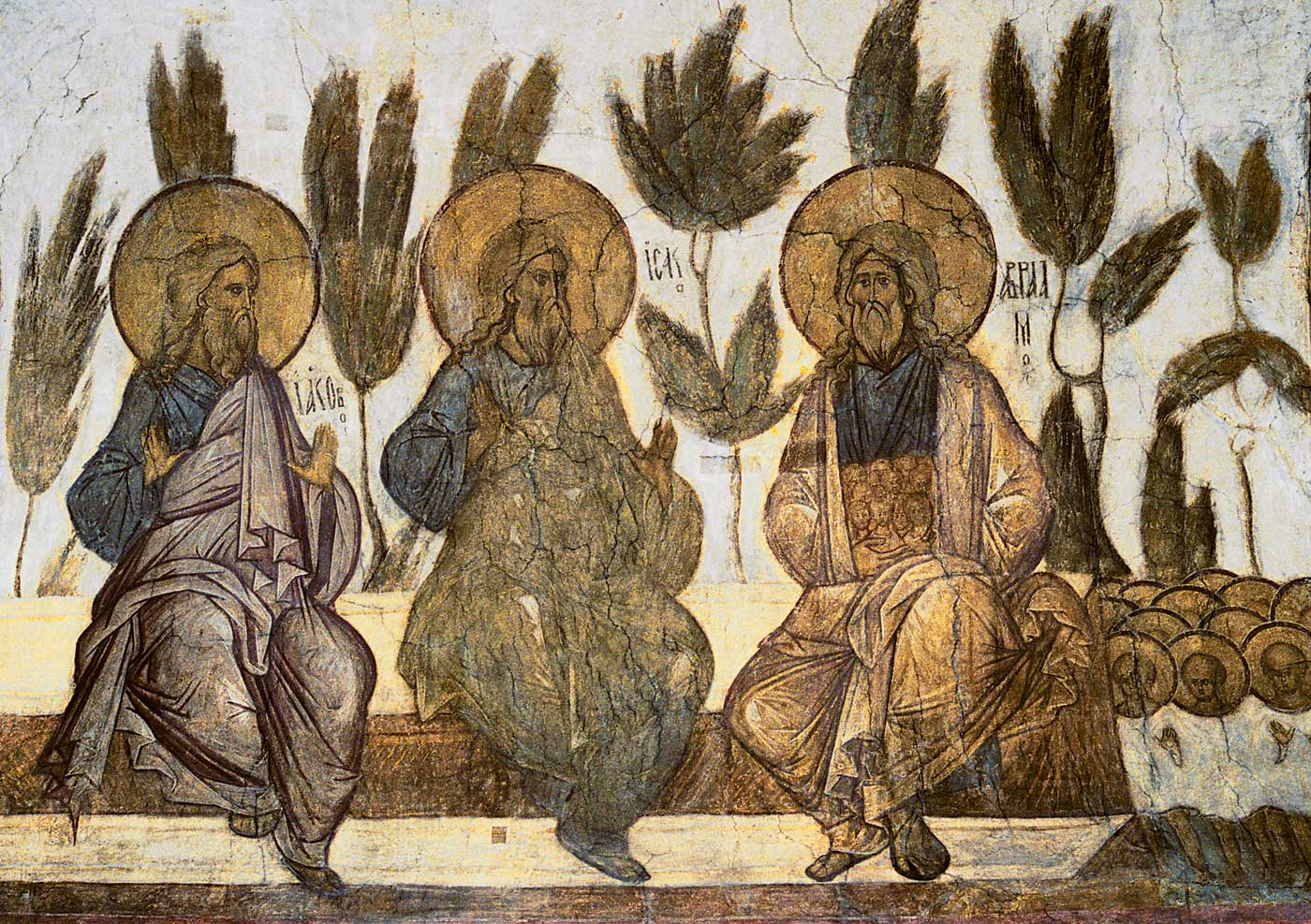
Fresco Bosom of Abraham by the historical Daniil Chyorny (c. 1360–1430)

=== I. The Jester (Summer 1400) ===
Andrei, Daniil and Kirill are wandering monks and religious icon painters, looking for work. The three represent different creative characters.

Andrei is the observer, a humanist who searches for the good in people and wants his art to inspire and not frighten. Daniil is withdrawn and resigned, bent less on creativity than on self-realisation. Kirill lacks talent as a painter, yet still strives to achieve prominence. He is jealous, self-righteous, very intelligent and perceptive.

The three have just left the Andronikov Monastery, where they have lived for many years, heading to Moscow. During a heavy rain shower they seek shelter in a barn, where a group of villagers is being entertained by a jester. The jester, or skomorokh, is a bitterly sarcastic enemy of the state, the Boyars, and the Church, who earns a living with his scathing and obscene social commentary. He lightly mocks the monks as they come in.

Kirill voices his disapproval of jesters and leaves unnoticed. Shortly after, a group of soldiers arrive and arrest the skomorokh, knocking him unconscious and smashing his musical instrument. During a momentary break in the rain, Kirill returns and induces his fellow monks to leave.

=== II. Theophanes the Greek (Summer–Winter–Spring–Summer 1405–1406) ===
Kirill arrives at the workshop of master painter Theophanes the Greek, who is working on a new icon of Jesus Christ. Theophanes is portrayed as a complex character: humanistic and God-fearing in his views yet somewhat cynical and disillusioned with other people, regarding his art more as a craft and a chore.

His young apprentices have all run away to the town square, where a wrongly convicted criminal is about to be tortured and executed. Kirill talks to Theophanes, who is impressed by the monk's understanding and erudition and invites him to work as his apprentice on the decoration of the Cathedral of the Annunciation in Moscow. Kirill eventually accepts, on the condition that Theophanes will personally tender the offer in the Andronikov Monastery, in front of all the fraternity and Andrei Rublev. Andrei has become renowned for his icon painting in the outside world, an admiration shared by Kirill and Theophanes.

A messenger from Theophanes subsequently arrives at the Andronikov Monastery, but hires Andrei instead of Kirill. Daniil refuses to accompany Andrei and reproaches him for accepting Theophanes' offer without considering his fellows, but soon repents of his temper and tearfully wishes Andrei well when the younger monk comes to say goodbye to his friend. Kirill is jealous of Andrei and, in a fit of anger, decides to leave the monastery for the secular world, throwing accusations of greed in the face of his fellow monks, who also dismiss him. Kirill's dog tries to follow him into the countryside, but he savagely beats it with his walking stick and leaves it for dead.

=== III. The Passion (1406) ===
Andrei leaves for Moscow with his young apprentice Foma. While walking in the woods, Andrei and Foma have a conversation about Foma's flaws, in particular lying.

While Foma has talent as an artist, he is less interested in the deeper meaning of his work and more concerned with the practical aspects of the job, like perfecting his use of unstable azure pigment. They encounter Theophanes in the forest, and the old master sends Foma away, unimpressed by his attitude to art. As he leaves, the apprentice finds a dead swan and fantasises about having a bird's-eye view.

In the forest, Andrei and Theophanes argue about religion, while Foma cleans his master's paint brushes. Theophanes argues that the ignorance of the Russian people is due to stupidity, while Andrei says that he does not understand how he can be a painter and maintain such views. This section contains a Passion Play, or a reenactment of Christ's Crucifixion, on a snow-covered hillside which plays out as Andrei recounts the events of Christ's death and expresses his belief that the men who crucified him were obeying God's will and loved him.

=== IV. The Holiday (1408) ===
Camping for the night on a riverbank, Andrei and Foma are collecting firewood for their travelling party when Andrei hears the distant sounds of celebration further upstream in the woods. Going to investigate, he comes upon a large group of naked pagans who are conducting a lit-torch ritual for Kupala Night. Andrei, intrigued and excited by the behaviour of the pagans, is caught spying on a couple making love. He is imprisoned, his arms tied to a crossbeam in a mockery of Jesus' crucifixion, and threatened with drowning in the morning.

A woman named Marfa, dressed only in a fur coat, approaches Andrei, who responds with hostility. After lamenting that her people are persecuted for their beliefs, she drops her coat, kisses Andrei and frees him. Andrei runs away and gets lost in the dense woods, only finding his group the next morning. As they leave on their boats, they see a group of soldiers pursuing several of the pagans, including Marfa. Her lover is captured, but she escapes into the river, swimming right by Andrei's boat. He and his fellow monks look away in shame.

=== V. The Last Judgment (Summer 1408) ===
Andrei and Daniil are working on the decoration of a church in Vladimir, but the project has stalled for two months. Andrei confides to Daniil that the task disgusts him and that he is unable to paint a subject such as the Last Judgement, as he does not want to terrify people into submission. He comes to the conclusion that he has lost the ease of mind that an artist needs for his work. A messenger, Patrikei (Yuri Nikulin), arrives with word from the Bishop, who is furious, to say they have until autumn to finish the job. Foma, impatient and wanting to work, leaves Andrei's group and takes an offer to paint in a smaller, less prestigious church.

Elsewhere, stone carvers and decorators of Andrei's party have finished adorning the mansion of the Grand Prince. To their indignation, the Prince is dissatisfied with their work and tries to make them do it again. The artisans refuse, and leave promising that their new client, the Prince's brother, will have a more splendid house than the one they have just finished. In the forest they are waylaid and blinded by the Grand Prince's henchmen, leaving them incapable of practising their craft.

Back at the church, Andrei is dismayed by the news of the attack on the artisans and angrily throws paint on one of the walls. Sergei (Vladimir Titov), a young apprentice who escaped the assault unharmed, reads a random section of the Bible aloud, at Daniil's request, concerning women. A young woman, Durochka (Irma Raush), whose name identifies her as a holy fool, or Yurodivy, wanders in to take shelter from the rain and is upset by the sight of the paint on the wall. Her feeble-mindedness and innocence inspires in Andrei the idea to paint a feast.

=== VI. The Raid (Autumn 1408) ===
While the Grand Prince is away in Lithuania, his power-hungry younger brother forms an allegiance with a group of Tatars and raids Vladimir. The invasion of the combined armed forces results in great carnage and the burning of the city. One scene shows a horse falling from a flight of stairs.

Foma escapes the chaos in the city and goes into the nearby countryside, but as he is crossing a river he is killed by an arrow. The Tatars force their way into the barricaded church, now fully decorated with Andrei's paintings, where the majority of the citizens have taken refuge. Showing no mercy, the Tatars massacre the people and burn all the painted wooden altarpieces. Andrei, who is also in the church, saves Durochka from being raped by a Russian soldier by killing him with an axe. The bishop's messenger Patrikei is also present; he is tortured, but refuses to reveal the location of the city's gold. Eventually the Tatars kill him by pouring hot liquid metal from a melted crucifix into his mouth.

In the aftermath only Andrei and Durochka are left alive in the church. Andrei imagines a conversation with the dead Theophanes the Greek, lamenting the loss of his work and the cruelty of mankind, while Durochka distractedly plaits the hair of a dead woman. Andrei decides to give up painting and takes a vow of silence to atone for his killing of another man.

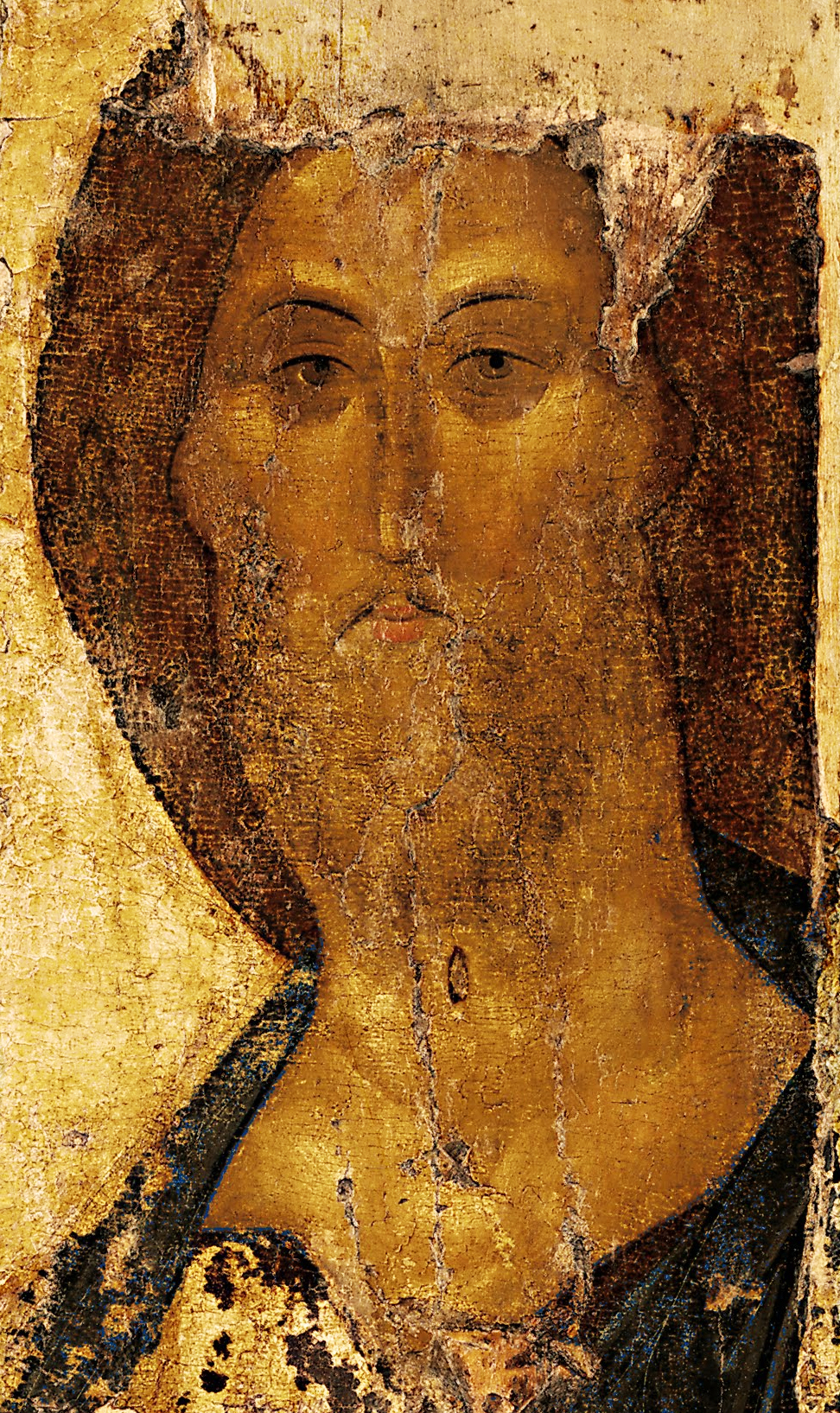
Christ the Redeemer icon from the so-called Zvenigorod Chin (c. 1410; today at the Tretyakov Gallery, Moscow)

=== VII. Silence (Winter 1412) ===
Note: In the 205-minute version known as The Passion According to Andrei, this episode is titled The Charity

Andrei is once again at the Andronikov Monastery as famine and war grip the country. He no longer paints and never speaks, and keeps Durochka with him as a fellow companion in silence.

In the same monastery, refugees discuss the problems plaguing their respective home towns. One man, who escaped from Vladimir, is recognised by a younger monk as the long absent Kirill. He has suffered during his time away from the monastery and begs the father superior to allow him to return. After initial rejections his wish is granted, but he is instructed to copy out the holy scriptures 15 times in penance.

Soon a passing group of Tatars stops at the monastery, much to the concern of Andrei and Kirill who have experienced their brutality firsthand. Durochka has no understanding or memory of what the Tatars did, and interacts freely with the group. The men taunt and play with her, and she is fascinated by one warrior's shining breastplate. Taking a liking to her, the Tatar adorns her with a blanket and his horned helmet, promising to take her away as his eighth, and only Russian, wife.

Delighted with the gifts, Durochka rides away with the Tatars despite Andrei's attempts to stop her. Kirill talks to Andrei for the first time since their departure from the monastery, assuring him that harming a holy fool is considered bad luck and a great sin, and that Durochka will be released unharmed. Andrei still does not speak, despite Kirill's pleading. Instead he continues his menial work of carrying large hot stones from a fire with tongs to heat water for the monastery, dropping one stone in the snow.

=== VIII. The Bell (Spring 1423–Spring 1424) ===
This episode concerns young Boriska, whose father, an expert bellmaker, has recently died in a plague. He secures a commission for a bell from the Grand Prince, claiming that he has peerless technical knowledge learnt at his father's deathbed.

On site, Boriska constantly contradicts and challenges his father's old team of workmen, having his own way in choosing the location of the pit, the selection of the proper clay, the building of the mould, the firing of the furnaces and finally the hoisting of the bell. One worker who refuses his orders is flogged in punishment. Beneath his bold demeanour, Boriska is increasingly bothered by self-doubt. He notices Andrei among the crowd of spectators.

During the bell-making, Andrei is confronted by the skomorokh from the first sequence, who has endured imprisonment and torture and suspects Andrei of having denounced him. Kirill, the true culprit, arrives and intervenes on behalf of the silent Andrei. Later he privately confesses to Andrei that his sinful envy dissipated once he heard Andrei had abandoned painting. He pleads with Andrei to cease wasting his God-given artistic talent, but receives no response.

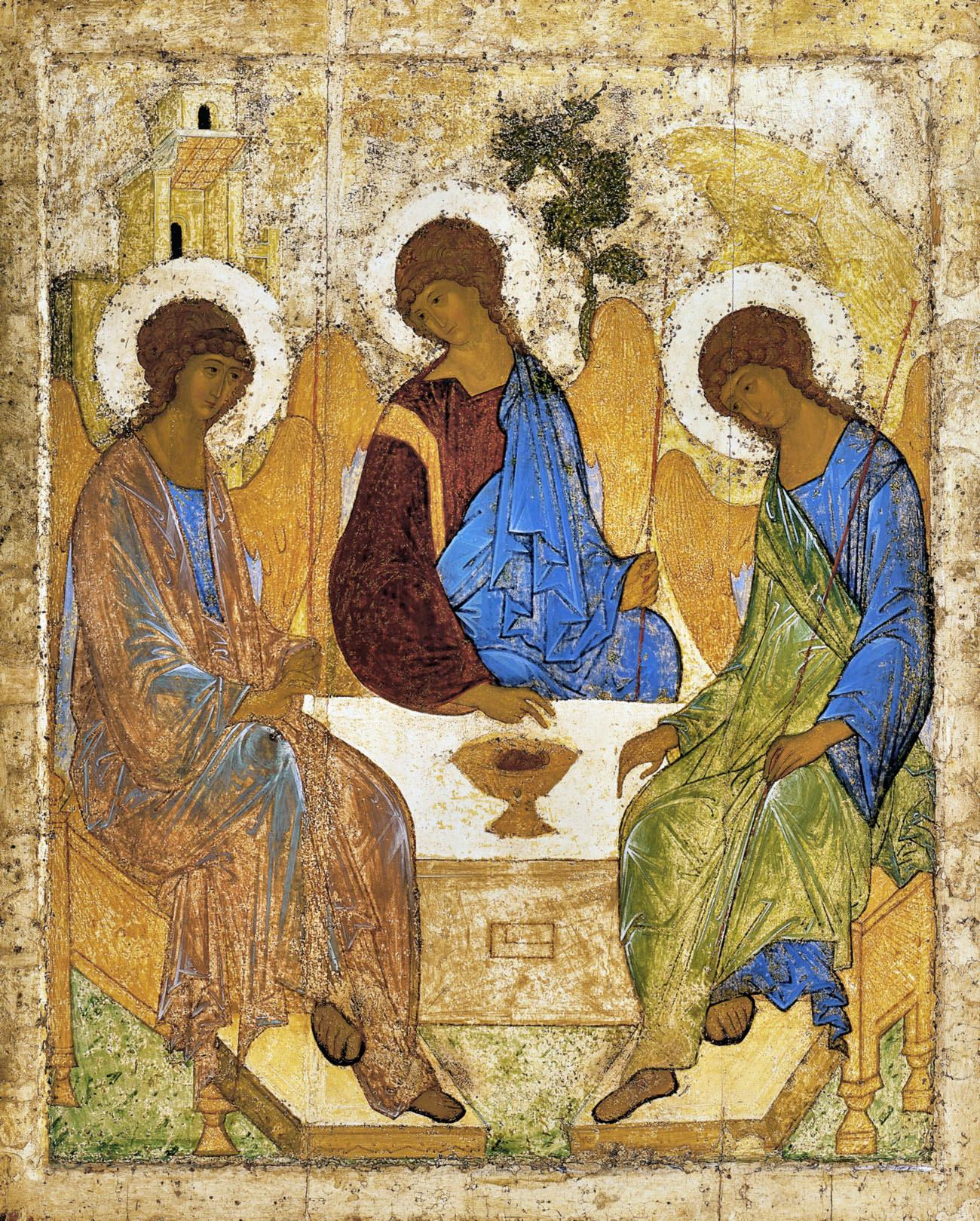
Andrei Rublev's famous icon of the Holy Trinity (c. 1410; Tretyakov Gallery, Moscow)

The successful progress of the bell sends Boriska into a state of stunned, detached disbelief. He gives fewer orders and lets the work crew take over; as the furnaces are opened and the molten metal pours into the mould, he privately asks God for help. After completion, the bell is hoisted into its tower and blessed by a priest. The Grand Prince attends the ceremony, having threatened to execute Boriska and the work crew if the bell fails to ring. It is overheard that he recently beheaded his own brother for the raid on Vladimir.

In the tense moments as the bell is set in motion, Durochka is seen walking through the crowd, leading a horse and preceded by a child which is, presumably, hers. The bell rings perfectly, and she smiles. Boriska, meanwhile, has collapsed. He admits afterward to Andrei that his father never actually told him his bell-casting secret. Andrei, impressed by the effect the successful ringing has had on the rejoicing crowd, realises the joy that his own art might bring. He comforts Boriska, breaking his vow of silence and telling the boy that they should carry on their work together: "You'll cast bells. I'll paint icons." Andrei then sees Durochka, her child and the horse walk off across a muddy field in the distance.

=== Epilogue ===
The epilogue is the only part of the film in colour and shows time-aged, but still vibrant, details of several of Andrei Rublev's actual icons. The icons are shown in the following order: Enthroned Christ, Twelve Apostles, The Annunciation, Twelve Apostles, Jesus entering Jerusalem, Birth of Christ, Enthroned Christ, Transfiguration of Jesus, Resurrection of Lazarus, The Annunciation, Resurrection of Lazarus, Birth of Christ, Trinity, Archangel Michael, Paul the Apostle, The Redeemer. The final scene crossfades from the icons and shows four horses standing by a river in thunder and rain.

== Cast ==
- Anatoly Solonitsyn – Andrei Rublev
- Ivan Lapikov – Kirill
- Nikolai Grinko – Daniil Chyorny
- Nikolai Sergeyev – Theophanes the Greek
- Irma Raush – Durochka (the holy fool girl)
- Nikolai Burlyayev – Boriska
- Yuriy Nazarov – Prince Yury of Zvenigorod/Grand Prince Vasily I of Moscow
- Yuri Nikulin – Patrikei the messenger
- Rolan Bykov – the Skomorokh
- Mikhail Kononov – Foma
- Nikolai Grabbe – sotnik Stepan
- Dmitry Orlovsky – old master (voiced by Ivan Ryzhov)
- Nikolay Glazkov – Yefim
- Nelly Snegina – Marfa
- Bolot Beyshenaliyev – Edigu, Khan of the Nogai Horde
- Igor Donskoy – Jesus in the Passion Play
- Irina Miroshnichenko – Mary Magdalene in the Passion Play

The voices of the Grand Prince's children were provided by Klara Rumyanova.

The film was the debut of Anatoly Solonitsyn.

== Production ==
In 1961, while working on his first feature film Ivan's Childhood, Tarkovsky made a proposal to Mosfilm for a film on the life of Russia's greatest icon painter, Andrei Rublev. The contract was signed in 1962 and the first treatment was approved in December 1963. Tarkovsky and his co-screenwriter Andrei Konchalovsky worked for more than two years on the script, studying medieval writings and chronicles and books on medieval history and art. In April 1964 the script was approved and Tarkovsky began working on the film. At the same time the script was published in the influential film magazine Iskusstvo Kino, and was widely discussed among historians, film critics and ordinary readers. The discussion on Andrei Rublev centred on the sociopolitical and historical, and not the artistic aspects of the film.

According to Tarkovsky, the original idea for a film about the life of Andrei Rublev was due to the film actor Vasily Livanov. Livanov proposed to write a screenplay together with Tarkovsky and Konchalovsky while they were strolling through a forest on the outskirts of Moscow. He also mentioned that he would love to play Andrei Rublev. Tarkovsky did not intend the film to be a historical or a biographical film about Andrei Rublev. Instead, he was motivated by the idea of showing the connection between a creative character's personality and the times through which he lives. He wanted to show an artist's maturing and the development of his talent. He chose Andrei Rublev for his importance in the history of Russian culture.

=== Casting ===
Tarkovsky cast Anatoly Solonitsyn for the role of Andrei Rublev. At this time Solonitsyn was an unknown actor at a theatre in Sverdlovsk. According to Tarkovsky everybody had a different image of the historical figure of Andrei Rublev, thus casting an unknown actor who would not remind viewers of other roles was his favoured approach. Solonitsyn, who had read the script in the film magazine Iskusstvo Kino, was very enthusiastic about the role, travelled to Moscow at his own expense to meet Tarkovsky and even declared that no one could play this role better than him. Tarkovsky felt the same, saying that "with Solonitsyn I simply got lucky". For the role of Andrei Rublev he required "a face with great expressive power in which one could see a demoniacal single-mindedness". To Tarkovsky, Solonitsyn provided the right physical appearance and the talent of showing complex psychological processes. Solonitsyn would continue to work with the director, appearing in Solaris, Mirror, and Stalker, and in the title role of Tarkovsky's 1976 stage production of Hamlet in Moscow's Lenkom Theatre. Before his death from cancer in 1982, Solonitsyn was also intended to play protagonist Andrei Gorchakov in Tarkovsky's 1983 Italian-Russian co-production Nostalghia, and to star in a project titled The Witch which Tarkovsky would significantly alter into his final production, The Sacrifice.

=== Filming ===
According to Johnson, filming did not begin until April 1965, one year after approval of the script, with J. Hoberman reporting an earlier date of September 1964 for the start of filming in his film essay for the Criterion collection release of the film. The initial budget was 1.6 million Rbls, but it was cut several times to one million roubles (In comparison, Sergei Bondarchuk's War and Peace had a budget of eight and half million roubles). As a result of the budget restrictions several scenes from the script were cut, including an opening scene showing the Battle of Kulikovo. Other scenes that were cut from the script are a hunting scene, where the younger brother of the Grand Prince hunts swans, and a scene showing peasants helping Durochka giving birth to her Russian-Tatar child. In the end the film cost 1.3 million Rbls, with the cost overrun due to heavy snowfall, which disrupted shooting from November 1965 until April 1966. The film was shot on location, on the Nerl River and the historical places of Vladimir/Suzdal, Pskov, Izborsk and Pechory.

Tarkovsky chose to shoot the main film in black and white and the epilogue, showing some of Rublev's icons, in colour. In an interview he motivated his choice with the claim that in everyday life one does not consciously notice colours. Consequently, Rublev's life is in black and white, whereas his art is in colour. The film was thus able to express the co-dependence of an artist's art and his personal life. In a 1969 interview, Tarkovsky stated that the flying man in the prologue is "the symbol of daring, in the sense that creation requires from man the complete offering of his being. Whether one wishes to fly before it has become possible, or cast a bell without having learned how to do it, or paint an icon – all these acts demand that, for the price of his creation, man should die, dissolve himself in his work, give himself entirely."

The colour sequence of Rublev's icons begins with showing only selected details, climaxing in Rublev's most famous icon, The Trinity. One reason for including this colour finale was, according to Tarkovsky, to give the viewer some rest and to allow him to detach himself from Rublev's life and to reflect. The film finally ends with the image of horses at river in the rain. To Tarkovsky horses symbolised life, and including horses in the final scene (and in many other scenes in the film) meant that life was the source of all of Rublev's art.

=== Editing ===
The first cut of the film was known as Andrei Passion (Russian: Страсти по Андрею, Strasti po Andryeyu, "The Passion according to Andrei"), though this title was not used for the released version of the film. The first cut of the film was over 195 minutes in length prior to being edited down to its released length. The first cut was completed in July 1966. Goskino demanded cuts to the film, citing its length, negativity, violence, and nudity. After Tarkovsky completed this first version, it would be five years before the film was widely released in the Soviet Union. The ministry's demands for cuts first resulted in a 190-minute version. Despite Tarkovsky's objections expressed in a letter to Alexey Romanov, the chairman of Goskino, the ministry demanded further cuts, and Tarkovsky trimmed the length to 186 minutes.

Robert Bird in his analysis of the comparison of the first cut of the film to the final Tarkovsky cut of the edited film summarised the editing process stating:

"The most conspicuous cuts were the most graphic shots of the stonemasons' gouged-out eyes, the burning cow, and the horse being lanced (although its horrific fall remained). Four embedded scenes of flashbacks or fantasies were also cut completely: Foma's fantasy of flight in episode two, Andrei's reminiscence of the three monks under a rain-soaked oak tree in episode four, the younger prince's fantasy of humiliating the Grand Prince in episode five, and Boriska's recollection of the bellfounding in episode seven. All in all, I have counted thirty-six shots which were completely deleted in the 185-minute version of Andrei Rublev, and about eighty-five which were considerably abbreviated, including nine very long takes which are split each into two or more parts. The total number of shots went from 403 to 390, with the average shot length dropping from 31" to 28". The only sequence which remained inviolable was the Epilogue in color."

=== Depictions of violence ===
Several scenes within the film depict violence, torture, and cruelty toward animals, which sparked controversy at the time of release. Most of these scenes took place during the raid of Vladimir, including one showing the blinding and the torture of a monk. The scenes involving cruelty toward animals were largely simulated. For example, during the Tatar raid of Vladimir a cow is set on fire. In reality the cow had an asbestos-covered coat and was not physically harmed; however, one scene depicts the real death of a horse. The horse falls from a flight of stairs and is then stabbed by a spear. In a 1967 interview for Literaturnoe obozrenie, interviewer Aleksandr Lipkov suggested to Tarkovsky that "the cruelty in the film is shown precisely to shock and stun the viewers. And this may even repel them." In an attempt to downplay the cruelty Tarkovsky responded: "No, I don't agree. This does not hinder viewer perception. Moreover, we did all this quite sensitively. I can name films that show much more cruel things, compared to which ours looks quite modest."

== Release and censorship ==
The film premiered with a single screening at the Dom Kino in Moscow in 1966. Audience reaction was enthusiastic, despite some criticism of the film's naturalistic depiction of violence. But the film failed to win approval for release from Soviet censors; the Central Committee of the Communist Party wrote in its review that "the film's ideological erroneousness is not open to doubt." Andrei Rublev was accused of being "anti-historical" in its failure to portray the context of its hero's life: the rapid development of large cities and the struggle against the Mongols. In February 1967, Tarkovsky and Alexei Romanov complained that the film was not yet approved for a wide release but refused to cut further scenes from the film.

Andrei Rublev was invited to the Cannes Film Festival in 1967 as part of a planned retrospective of Soviet film on occasion of the 50th anniversary of the October Revolution. The official answer was that the film was not yet completed and could not be shown at the film festival. A second invitation was made by the organisers of the Cannes Film Festival in 1969. Soviet officials accepted this invitation, but they only allowed the film to screen at the festival out of competition, and it was screened just once at 4 A.M. on the final day of the festival. Audience response nevertheless was enthusiastic, and the film won the FIPRESCI prize. Soviet officials tried to prevent the official release of the film in France and other countries, but were not successful as the French distributor had legally acquired the rights in 1969.

In the Soviet Union, influential admirers of Tarkovsky's work – including the film director Grigori Kozintsev, the composer Dmitri Shostakovich, and Yevgeny Surkov, the editor of Iskusstvo Kino – began pressuring for the release of Andrei Rublev. Tarkovsky and his second wife, Larisa Tarkovskaya, wrote letters to other influential personalities in support of the film's release, and Larisa Tarkovskaya even went with the film to Alexei Kosygin, then the Premier of the Soviet Union.

Despite Tarkovsky's refusal to make further cuts, Andrei Rublev finally was released on 24 December 1971, in the 186-minute 1966 version. The film was released in 277 prints and sold 2.98 million tickets. When the film was released, Tarkovsky remarked in his diary that in the entire city not a single poster for the film could be seen but that all theatres were sold out.

=== Tarkovsky final cut ===
Despite the cuts having originated with Goskino's demands, Tarkovsky ultimately endorsed the cut of the film over the original 205-minute version:

Nobody has ever cut anything from Andrei Rublev. Nobody except me. I made some cuts myself. In the first version, the film was 3 hours and 20 minutes long. In the second — 3 hours 15 minutes. I shortened the final version to 3 hours 6 minutes. I am convinced the latest version is the best, the most successful. And I only cut certain overly long scenes. The viewer doesn't even notice their absence. The cuts have in no way changed the subject matter nor what was important in the film for us. In other words, we removed overly long scenes which had no significance. We shortened certain scenes of brutality in order to induce psychological shock in viewers, as opposed to a mere unpleasant impression that would only destroy our intent. All my friends and colleagues who, during long discussions, were advising me to make those cuts turned out right in the end. It took me some time to understand it. At first, I got the impression they were attempting to pressure my creative individuality. Later I understood that this final version of the film more than fulfils my requirements for it. And I do not regret at all that the film has been shortened to its present length.

The original 1966 version of the film titled as The Passion According to Andrei was published by The Criterion Collection in 2018 and released in both DVD and Blu-ray format.

=== Unauthorised Soviet television version ===
In 1973, the film was shown on Soviet television in a 101-minute version that Tarkovsky did not authorise. Notable scenes that were cut from this version were the raid of the Tatars and the scene showing naked pagans. The epilogue showing details of Andrei Rublev's icons was in black and white as the Soviet Union had not yet fully transitioned to colour TV. In 1987, when Andrei Rublev was once again shown on Soviet TV, the epilogue was also in black and white, despite the Soviet Union having completely transitioned to colour TV. Another difference from the original version of the film was the inclusion of a short explanatory note at the beginning of the film, detailing the life of Andrei Rublev and the historical background. When the film was released in the U.S. and other countries in 1973, the distributor Columbia Pictures cut it by an additional 20 minutes, making the film an incoherent mess in the eyes of many critics and leading to unfavourable reviews.

=== Scorsese use of the first-cut version ===
In the mid-1990s, Criterion Collection released the first-cut 205-minute version of Andrei Rublev on LaserDisc, which Criterion re-issued on DVD in 1999 (Criterion advertises this version as the "director's cut" despite Tarkovsky's stated preference for the 186-minute version). According to Tarkovsky's sister, Marina Tarkovskaya, one of the editors of the film, Lyudmila Feiginova, secretly kept a print of the 205-minute cut under her bed. Criterion's producer of the project stated that the video transfer was sourced from a film print that filmmaker Martin Scorsese had acquired while visiting Russia. In 2016, a Blu-ray version of the film was released in the United Kingdom using the 186-minute version preferred by Tarkovsky. Criterion released both the first and final cut of the film on DVD and Blu-ray in September 2018.

== Reception ==
=== Critical response ===
Andrei Rublev has an approval rating of 96% on review aggregator website Rotten Tomatoes, based on 47 reviews, and an average rating of 9.0/10. The website's critical consensus states, "Andrei Rublev is a cerebral epic that filters challenging ideas through a grand scope -- forming a moving thesis on art, faith, and the sweep of history".

J. Hoberman, a film critic for The Village Voice, summarised the early reception of the film in the film notes included in the Criterion DVD release of the film stating: "Two years later (in 1973), Rublev surfaced at the New York Film Festival, cut another 20 minutes by its American distributor, Columbia Pictures. Time compared the movie unfavorably to Dr. Zhivago; those other New York reviewers who took note begged off explication, citing Rublev's apparent truncation." Stanley Kauffmann of The New Republic wrote: "Andrei contains some of the most authentic historical reality I have seen on screen with lavishness, intensity, and sweep".

=== Awards and nominations ===
Andrei Rublev won several awards. In 1969, the film was screened at the Cannes Film Festival. Due to pressure by Soviet officials, the film could only be shown out of competition, and was thus not eligible for the Palme d'Or or the Grand Prix. Nevertheless, it won the prize of the international film critics, FIPRESCI. In 1971 Andrei Rublev won the Critics Award of the French Syndicate of Cinema Critics, and in 1973 the Jussi Award for Best Foreign Film.

=== Legacy ===
The film is referenced in Tarkovsky's two films that followed this one. It is first referenced in Solaris, made in 1972, by having an icon by Andrei Rublev being placed in the main character's room. It is next referenced by having a poster of the film being hung on a wall in Mirror, made in 1975.

In 1995, the Vatican placed Andrei Rublev on their list of 45 "great films". The Village Voice ranked the film at number 112 in its Top 250 "Best Films of the Century" list in 1999, based on a poll of critics. The film was voted at No. 77 on the list of "100 Greatest Films" by the prominent French magazine Cahiers du cinéma in 2008. In 2010, Andrei Rublev tied for second in a U.K. newspaper series of the "Greatest Films of All Time" as voted by critics from The Guardian and The Observer. The film was ranked No. 87 in Empire magazine's "The 100 Best Films Of World Cinema" in 2010. Also in 2010, the film topped the list of The Guardian's "25 Best arthouse films of all time". The same year, the Toronto International Film Festival released its "Essential 100" list of films in which Andrei Rublev also placed No. 87.

In 2011, director Joanna Hogg listed it as a film that changed her life. In the 2012 Sight & Sound polls, it was ranked the 26th-greatest film ever made in the critics' poll and 13th in the directors' poll. In the earlier 2002 version of the list the film ranked 35th among critics and 24th among directors. In the critics' poll by the same magazine it ranked 11th and 24th in 1982 and 1992 respectively. In the most recent 2022 edition of the BFI's Greatest films of all time list the film ranked 67th in the critics' poll and 26th in the directors' poll. In 2018 the film ranked at number 40 on the BBC's list of the 100 greatest foreign-language films, as voted on by 209 film critics from 43 countries.

== See also ==
- Middle Ages in film
