= But Beautiful =

But Beautiful may refer to:

- "But Beautiful" (song), 1947 popular song by Johnny Burke and Jimmy Van Heusen
- But Beautiful (Bing Crosby album) (1962), Bing Crosby compilation album
- But Beautiful: A Book About Jazz, 1991 book by Geoff Dyer
- But Beautiful (Nancy Wilson album), 1969 album by Nancy Wilson
- But Beautiful (Kenny Barron and Joe Locke album), 1991 album by Kenny Barron and Joe Locke
- But Beautiful, 1992 album by the Jimmy Raney Trio with George Mraz and Lewis Nash
- But Beautiful (Stan Getz & Bill Evans album), 1996 album, recorded in 1974 by Stan Getz & Bill Evans
- But Beautiful (Boz Scaggs album), 2003 album of jazz standards by Boz Scaggs
