= White Sands: Experiences from the Outside World =

Travel book by Geoff Dyer

- Author: Geoff Dyer
- Publisher: Pantheon Books
- Publication date: May 3, 2016
- ISBN: 9781101870853

White Sands: Experiences from the Outside World is a 2016 travel book written by Geoff Dyer. The book was previously titled White Sands. The writer described the book as a mixture of fiction and non-fiction. The book's narration begins in Tahiti. White Sands is a collection of travel-related essays, short stories, photographs and vignettes.
