= El-Detti =

El Detti is a village in the Northern Province of Sudan, on the right bank of the Nile between the Third and Fourth Cataracts. An Early Makurian cemetery is located there.

== History of research ==
In 1919, American archaeologist G.A. Reisner visited the site, excavated a few of the tombs, and drew a plan of the cemetery. The tumuli field was also recorded in 1992 during a survey carried out as part of a project of the Sudanese National Corporation for Antiquities and Museums (NCAM) and the Italian University of Cassino, which was headed by Irene Vincentelli. Since 2014, the research is conducted in the framework of the "Early Makuria Research Project", a cooperation between the NCAM and the Polish Centre of Mediterranean Archaeology University of Warsaw (PCMA UW). The Polish–Sudanese project is directed by Mahmoud el-Tayeb from the PCMA UW. The first season consisted of a survey and documentation work; regular excavations began in 2015.

== Archaeological discoveries ==
Several dozen tumuli graves are dispersed over an area measuring 500 by 400 m. All were robbed in the past. The main aim of the research is to analyze their construction and compare it to the tombs from the Az-Zuma site, located at a distance of about 7 km. Examined the mortuary customs helped identify the funeral practices of Early Makurian society and track the spread of the Early Makurian society over time. Fragments of ceramic vessels found by the walls located south-east of the cemetery indicate that it may have been a part of a Christian site (as yet unidentified). This suggests that the settlement continued to exist in the Christian period. Similar to the Az-Zuma site, three types of tumuli were distinguished. The mission's work includes anthropological and archaeozoological research as well as studies on pottery and metal objects.
