= Geoff Dyer =

English writer (born 1958)

Geoff Dyer FRSL
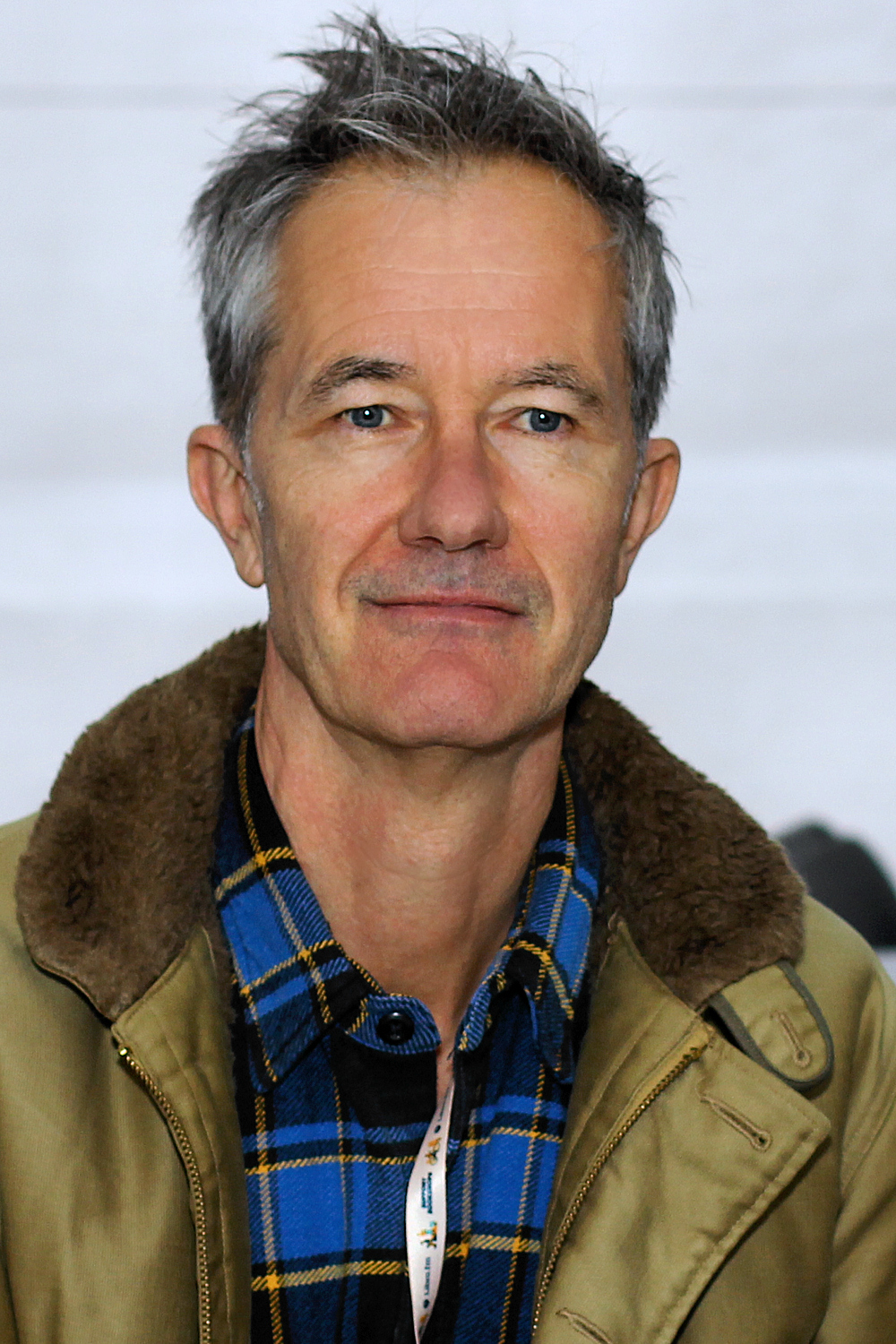
- Dyer at the 2023 Texas Book Festival
- Born: 1958 (age 67–68); Cheltenham, Gloucestershire, England
- Education: Corpus Christi College, Oxford
- Occupation: Writer
- Spouse: Rebecca Wilson
- Writing career
- Notable awards: Somerset Maugham Award; 1992 But Beautiful Best Travel Book Award; 2004 Yoga For People Who Can't Be Bothered To Do It – WH Smith Literary Award; Best Comic Novel – Bollinger Everyman Wodehouse Prize; 2009 Jeff in Venice, Death in Varanasi; National Book Critics Circle Award for Criticism; 2011 Otherwise Known as the Human Condition Windham–Campbell Literature Prize (Non-Fiction); 2015
- Website: geoffdyer.com

Geoff Dyer (born 1958) is an English author. He has written a number of novels and non-fiction books, some of which have won literary awards. Dyer was made a Fellow of the Royal Society of Literature in 2005.

== Early life and education ==
Dyer was born and raised in Cheltenham, England, as the only child of a sheet metal worker father and a school dinner lady mother. He was educated at the local grammar school and won a scholarship to study English at Corpus Christi College, Oxford. After graduating from Oxford, he claimed unemployment benefits, and moved into a property in Brixton with other former Oxford students. He credits this period with teaching him the craft of writing.

== Writing career ==
Dyer's debut novel, The Colour of Memory, is set in Brixton in the 1980s, the decade that he lived there. The novel has been described as a "fictionalization of Dyer's 20s".

Dyer is the author of the following novels: The Colour of Memory (1989), The Search (1993), Paris Trance (1998) and Jeff in Venice, Death in Varanasi (2009). He wrote a critical study of John Berger – Ways of Telling – and two collections of essays: Anglo-English Attitudes and Working the Room. A selection of essays from these collections entitled Otherwise Known as the Human Condition was published in the U.S. in April 2011 and won the National Book Critics Circle Award for Criticism.

Dyer has written the following non-fiction titles: But Beautiful (on jazz); The Missing of the Somme (on the memorialisation of the First World War); Out of Sheer Rage: Wrestling with D. H. Lawrence; Yoga For People Who Can't Be Bothered To Do It; The Ongoing Moment (on photography); Zona (about Andrei Tarkovsky's 1979 film Stalker); and Broadsword Calling Danny Boy (about Brian G. Hutton's 1968 film Where Eagles Dare). In 2019, Out of Sheer Rage was listed by Slate as one of the 50 greatest nonfiction works of the past 25 years. He is the editor of John Berger: Selected Essays and co-editor, with Margaret Sartor, of What Was True: The Photographs and Notebooks of William Gedney.

Dyer's 2014 book Another Great Day at Sea chronicles his experiences on the USS George H.W. Bush, where he was writer-in-residence for two weeks.

In September 2026, Canongate Books acquired L’Avventura, Dyer's first novel in 17 years, from the Wylie Agency for publication in May 2027.

== Academic career ==
In 2013, he was the Bedell Distinguished Visiting Professor at the University of Iowa's Nonfiction Writing Program. He now teaches in the PhD program at the University of Southern California.

== Personal life ==
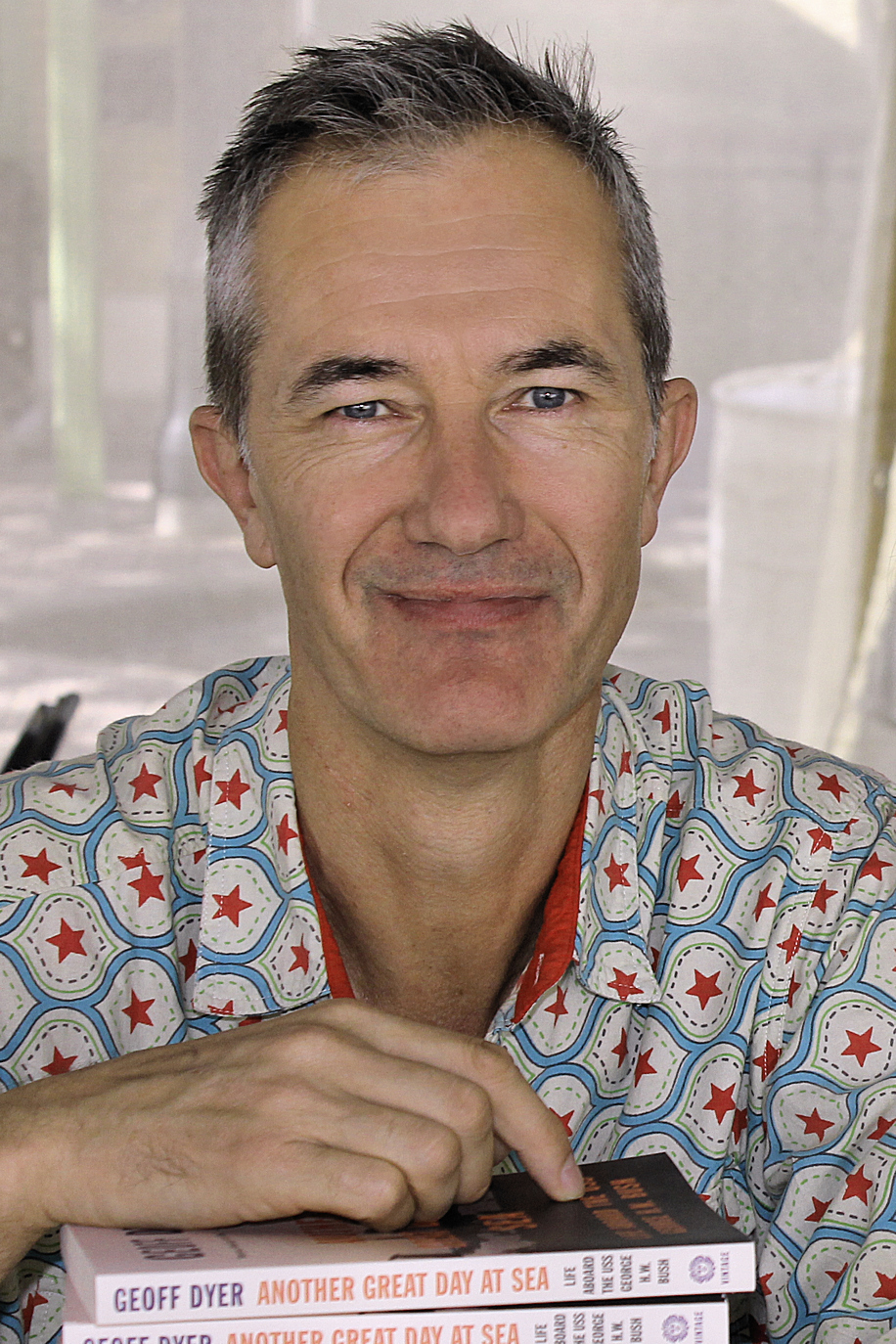
Dyer in 2015.

Dyer is married to Rebecca Wilson, chief curator at Saatchi Art, Los Angeles. He lives in Venice, California. In March 2014, Dyer said he had had a minor stroke earlier in the year, shortly after moving to live in Venice.

== Awards and honours ==
- 1992: Somerset Maugham Award winner for But Beautiful
- 1998: National Book Critics Circle Award for Criticism finalist for Out of Sheer Rage
- 2003: Lannan Literary Fellowship
- 2004: WH Smith Best Travel Book Award winner for Yoga For People Who Can't Be Bothered To Do It
- 2005: Fellow of the Royal Society of Literature
- 2006: International Center of Photography (ICP) Infinity Award for Writing on photography for The Ongoing Moment
- 2009: GQ Writer of the Year Award
- 2009: Bollinger Everyman Wodehouse Prize for Best Comic Novel for Jeff in Venice, Death in Varanasi
- 2011: National Book Critics Circle Award for Criticism winner for Otherwise Known as the Human Condition
- 2014: Honorary Fellow of Corpus Christi College, Oxford.
- 2015: Windham–Campbell Literature Prize (Non-Fiction) valued at $150,000

== Publications ==
=== Books ===
- Dyer, Geoff (1986). Ways of Telling: the work of John Berger. London: Pluto Press.
- — (1989). The Colour of Memory. London: Jonathan Cape.
- — (1991). But Beautiful: A Book About Jazz. London: Jonathan Cape.
- — (1993). The Search. London: Hamish Hamilton.
- — (1994). The Missing of the Somme. London: Hamish Hamilton.
- — (1997). Out of Sheer Rage: In the Shadow of D. H. Lawrence. London: Little, Brown.
  - U.S. edition: Out of Sheer Rage: Wrestling with D. H. Lawrence. U.S. edition. New York: North Point Press. 1998.
- — (1998). Paris Trance. London: Abacus.
- — (1999). Anglo-English Attitudes: essays, reviews, misadventures 1984–99. London: Abacus.
- Sartor, Margaret; Dyer, Geoff, eds. (2000). What Was True: the photographs and notebooks of William Gedney. New York: Center for Documentary Studies.
- Berger, John (2001). Dyer, Geoff (ed.). Selected essays. London: Bloomsbury.
- Dyer, Geoff (2003). Yoga for people who can't be bothered to do it. London: Time Warner.
- — (2005). The Ongoing Moment. London: Little, Brown.
- — (2009). Jeff in Venice, Death in Varanasi. Edinburgh: Canongate.
- — (2010). Working the Room : essays and reviews, 1999–2010. Edinburgh: Canongate.
- — (2011). Otherwise Known as the Human Condition: selected essays and reviews, 1989–2010. Minneapolis, MN: Graywolf Press.
- — (2012). The Colour of Memory. Rev. and updated ed. Edinburgh: Canongate.
- — (2012). Zona: A Book About a Film About a Journey to a Room. Edinburgh: Canongate.
  - — (2012). Zona: a book about a film about a journey to a room. U.S. edition. New York: Pantheon.
- — (2014). Another great day at sea : life aboard the USS George H.W. Bush. Photographs by Chris Steele-Perkins. New York: Pantheon.
- — (2016). White Sands: Experiences from the Outside World. New York: Pantheon.
- — (2018). Broadsword Calling Danny Boy. London: Penguin.
- — (2018). The Street Philosophy of Garry Winogrand. Austin: University of Texas Press. ISBN 978-1477310335.
- — (2021). See/Saw: Looking at Photographs. Edinburgh: Canongate.
- — (2022). The Last Days of Roger Federer: And Other Endings. New York: Farrar, Straus and Giroux.
- — (2025). Homework: A Memoir. New York: Farrar, Straus and Giroux. ISBN 978-0374616229.

=== Critical studies and reviews of Dyer's work ===
- Wood, James (20 April 2009). "From Venice to Varanasi - Geoff Dyer's Wandering Eye". The New Yorker. Vol. 90, no. 9.
