= Nikolai Grinko =

Soviet/Ukrainian actor

Nikolai Grinko PAUkrSSR
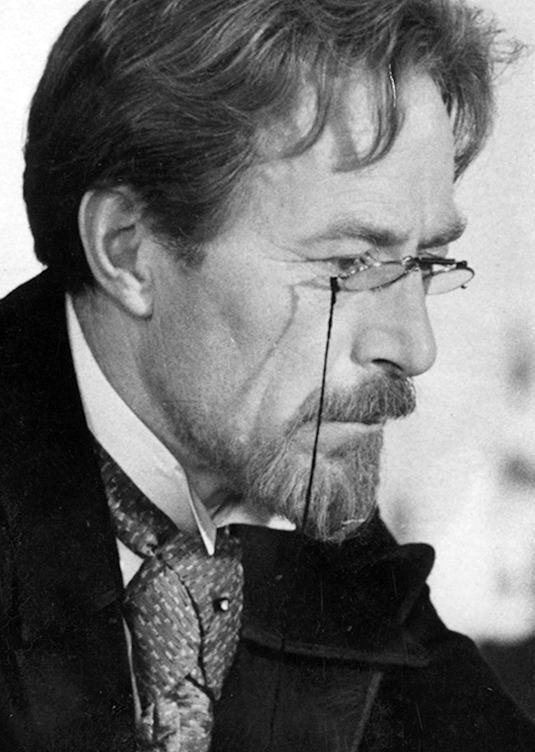
- Grinko in 1968
- Born: 22 May 1920; Kherson, Ukrainian SSR
- Died: 10 April 1989 (aged 68); Kiev, Ukrainian SSR, Soviet Union
- Occupation: Actor
- Years active: 1946–1989

Nikolai Grigoryevich Grinko (Note: Russian: Николай Григорьевич Гринько.) or Mykola Hryhorovych Hrynko (Note: Ukrainian: Микола Григорович Гринько.) ( 22 May 1920 – 10 April 1989) was a Soviet actor.

== Biography ==
Nikolai Grinko was born on 22 May 1920, in Kherson, Ukrainian SSR. He died on 10 April 1989, in Kiev.

His wife was Ayshe Rafetovna Chulak-ogly (born 1932), a violinist of the State Radio and Television Symphony Orchestra of the Ukrainian SSR, a jazz-symphonic ensemble Dnepr.

== Career ==
In 1961, Grinko switched to cinema. But at his "native" Dovzhenko Film Studio, he was not considered a "native" actor, he was filmed very little, and was not offered any leading roles. His screenplay for Ivan Franko's Stolen Happiness had been lying in the studio offices for 6 years and was put on the shelf.

Grinko is well known for his roles in the films of Andrei Tarkovsky, including: Ivan's Childhood, Andrei Rublev, Solaris, Mirror, and Stalker.

He also starred in the 1981 film Teheran 43.

== Selected filmography ==
- Peace to Him Who Enters (1961) − American driver
- Ivan's Childhood (1962) − Gryaznov
- Velká cesta (1963) − red brigade commander
- Shadows of Forgotten Ancestors (1965) − Vatag
- War and Peace (1966−1967, part 1, 3) − Dessalles
- Andrei Rublev (1966) − Daniil Chyorny
- Subject for a Short Story (1969) − Anton Pavlovich Chekhov
- Dangerous Tour (1969) − Andrei Maksimovich
- Solaris (1972) − Nik Kelvin, father of Kris Kelvin
- A Lover's Romance (1974) − Vice Admiral
- Adventures in a City that does not Exist (1974) − Don Quixote
- Mirror (1975) − printing house director
- Afonya (1975) − aunt
- Woodpeckers Don't Get Headaches (1975) − Mukhin's father
- The Adventures of Buratino (1976, TV Movie) − Papa Carlo
- One−Two, Soldiers Were Going... (1977) − Colonel, Konstantin's commander
- Twenty Days Without War (1977) − Colonel Aleksandrov
- Osvobození Prahy (1977) − General Omar Bradley
- Stalker (1979) − professor
- The Adventures of the Elektronic (1979, TV Mini−Series) − professor Gromov
- The Bodyguard (1979) − Nikolai Grigorievich
- The Youth of Peter the Great (1980) − Nektaryi
- At the Beginning of Glorious Days (1980) − Nektaryi
- Teheran 43 (1981) − Hermolin
- Be My Husband (1981) − Holiday–maker, husband of the theatregoer
