= Yamaha BW =

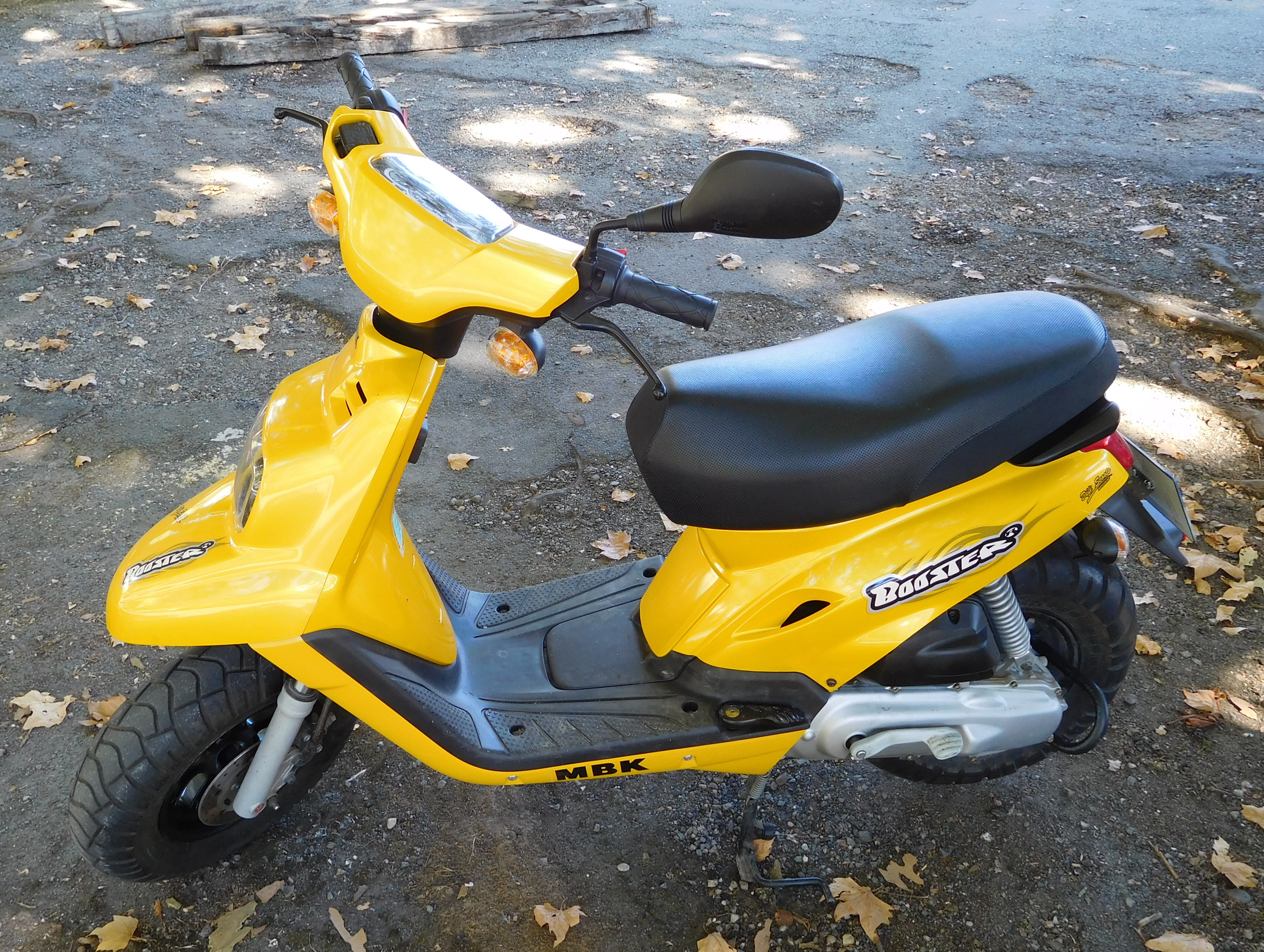
- Manufacturer: Yamaha
- Also called: MBK Booster
- Production: 1988-2011
- Class: Scooter
- Engine: Horizontal Minarelli 49-125 cc air-cooledtwo-stroke, electronic ignition Bore x stroke: 40.0 mm x 39.2 mm Compression ratio: 7.0:1
- Power: 1.9hp
- Transmission: V-belt automatic
- Suspension: Front: Telescopic fork Rear: Single shock
- Brakes: Front: 115mm disc Rear: drum
- Tires: Front: 120/90-10; Rear 130/90-10
- Wheelbase: 50.2 in (1,275 mm)
- Dimensions: L: 74.4 in (1,890 mm); W: 27.8 in (706 mm); H: 43.7 in (1,110 mm)
- Seat height: 30.1 in (765 mm)
- Fuel capacity: 1.5 US gallons (5.7 L)
- Fuel consumption: 123 mpg_{‑US} (1.91 L/100 km)
- Related: Yamaha Zuma

The Yamaha BW is an air-cooled two-stroke scooter made by Yamaha Motor Company. It is also marketed as the MBK Booster.

== Overview ==
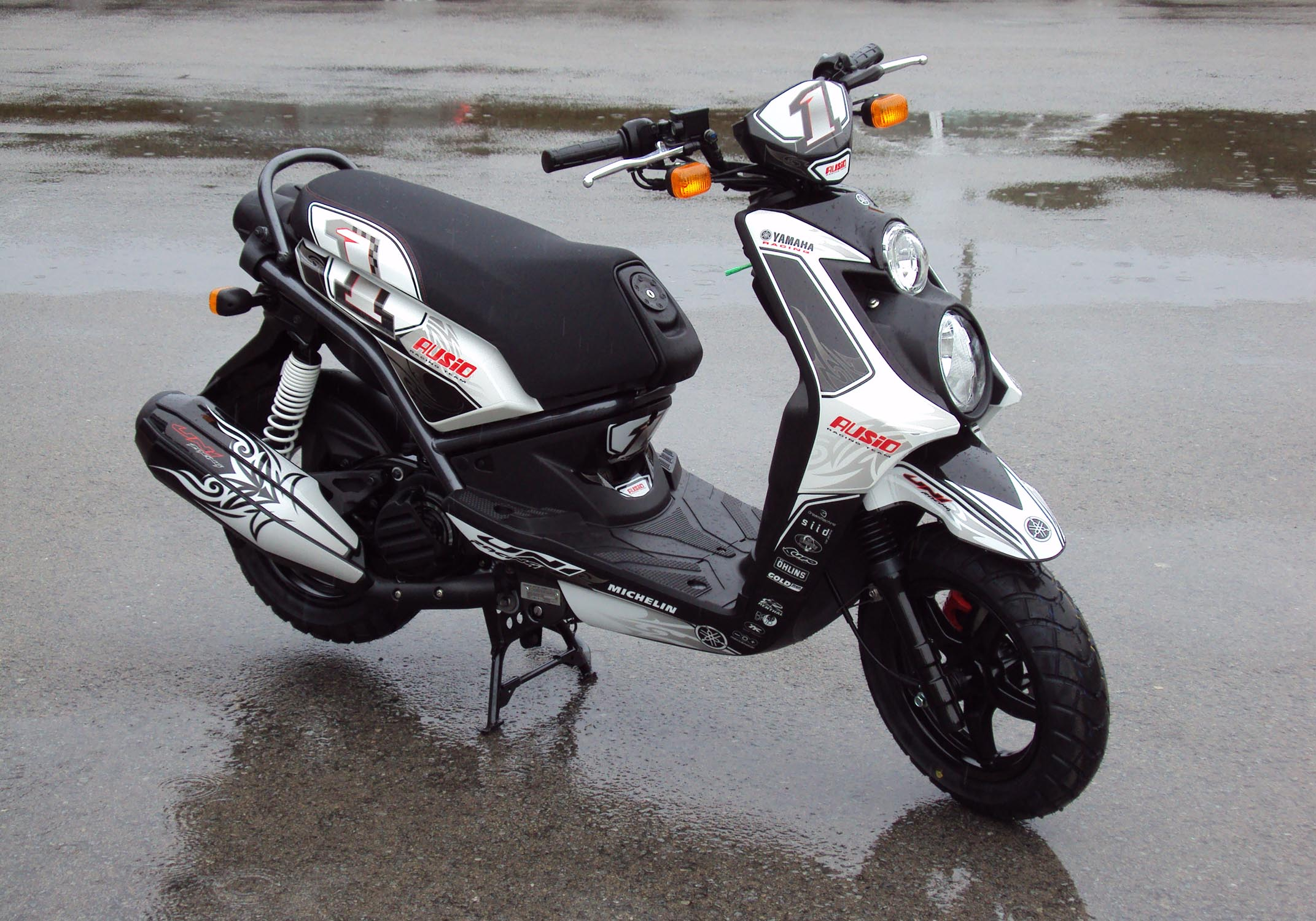
Yamaha BW 125

The Zuma has a 14 mm Teikei carburetor with automatic choke, reed-valve induction, a fan-assisted cooling system, an autolube oil-injection system with an indicator light located on instrument panel which alerts rider when oil level gets low, and electric starting with backup kick start.

It also has five spoke-cast wheels with 120/90-10 front and 130/90-10 rear tires. The front fork has 2.6 inches (66 mm) of travel, and rear shock has 2.4 inches (61 mm) of travel. The scooter also has 155 mm hydraulic front disc brakes and rear drum brakes. (Models until 1998 had front drum brake instead of a hydraulic one.)

The dual seat contains a storage compartment adequate for a single full-face helmet. The rear cargo rack can be used for additional carrying capacity but requires the use of ropes or bungee cords to secure any load. This rack can also function as passenger grabrails. Post-2001 Zumas have "bug-eyed" dual headlights that come with one light wired to low beam and the other wired to high beam (both lamps have filaments for high and low beam functions, however, and many users install an inexpensive and simple wiring modification to make both headlamps light with both the high and low beams). The instrument panel has turn signal indicators, a high beam indicator, a low-oil indicator, a speedometer, a gas level gauge, and an odometer.

Yamaha specifies that the Zuma can safely carry up to 315 lb (143 kg) of passengers and cargo. Yamaha took the Zuma off the market in the U.S. in 2006 and 2007, and then reintroduced the model in 2008–2011. The models from 2008 to 2011 have a slightly higher gear ratio that helps compensate (at the expense of a little less power on take-off).

In 2011 Yamaha introduced the Zuma 125, followed in 2012 by the Zuma 50f (which replaced the 2-stroke version), both 4-stroke fuel-injected models.

== Model codes ==
Yamaha numbers its scooter models according to their make (in the case of the Zuma, all models manufactured between 1989 and 1990 as well as those made between 1997 and 2001 inclusive begin with the letters CW, and those made after 2001 have model numbers beginning with the letters YW) followed by the engine size (given in approximate cubic centimeters— the Zuma's usual 49 cc 1.7 hp engine is assigned the number 50) and the year in which the vehicle was made, given as either a one or two letter designation and increasing by one "letter category" each full year, with an optional letter placed either before or after the year letter category and considered an amendment code. For example, the letter designation for the year 2002 for the Zuma was the letter P, so a Zuma manufactured in 2002 would have the designation YW50P. However, Yamaha made some changes to the model during its year run, so some Zumas manufactured in 2002 have the model code YW50AP to distinguish them from the YW50P model.

All YW50P Zumas are identical in construction design to all other YW50P Zumas but will differ (in this particular instance, only slightly) from a YW50AP. Yamaha did not use the letter Q, and the letter for 2003 is the letter R (there was only one model for this year, the YW50R). For 2004, the letter S (the YW50S model). In 2008, assigned the letter X, Yamaha had two models: the YW50XL and the YW50XB, and so on. In 2011 the numbering system moved to the letter A (YW125AB for the 125 CC model and YW50AL for the 49 CC model).

== Fuel economy ==
The United States Environmental Protection Agency mileage estimates for the Zuma are up to 123 mpg_{‑US} (1.91 L/100 km; 148 mpg_{‑imp}), depending upon how it is ridden, maintenance, road conditions, cargo, and driver/passenger weight.
