= Rebecca Wilson (curator) =

British art curator and editor

- Education: University of Cambridge; University College London
- Occupations: Art curator and editor
- Spouse: Geoff Dyer

Rebecca Wilson is an art curator and editor, who is currently chief curator and vice president of Art Advisory at Saatchi Art.

== Biography ==
Wilson graduated in 1990 with a BA degree from the University of Cambridge and received her MA degree from University College London in 1991. She started her career in book and magazine publishing as publishing director of Weidenfeld & Nicolson publishing house and then became deputy editor of Modern Painters and editor of ArtReview.

She joined Saatchi Gallery in 2006 as director and in 2013 became chief curator and directory of art advisory of Saatchi Art. In 2007, Wilson created the "New Sensations" prize – an award for art students, to support emerging artists in the United Kingdom.

=== Personal life ===
Wilson is married to English writer Geoff Dyer.

== Charles Saatchi lawsuit ==
In 2014, Charles Saatchi sued Wilson for alleged trading in his name after she moved from being director of Saatchi Gallery to her Saatchi Art position.
