= Zona: A Book About a Film About a Journey to a Room =

Book by Geoff Dyer

- First edition
- Author: Geoff Dyer
- Publisher: Canongate Books
- Publication date: United Kingdom; 2012
- Pages: 228pp.
- ISBN: 9780857861665

Zona: A Book About a Film About a Journey to a Room is a 2012 book by Geoff Dyer.

== Content ==
The book is a discussion by Dyer of the film Stalker directed by Andrei Tarkovsky in 1979. The title is taken from the mysterious and enigmatic Zone which is a locus within the film itself. The work is based on a close, scene-by-scene reading with a large number of digressions, including autobiographical discussions such as the time and place where Dyer watched the film (and observations of how his own perspective has changed over time - for example he declares that as he has aged he has grown less and less concerned with trying to find a definite answer to what the film as a whole 'means'). The first time that he saw the film was in his early 20s having just finished his education in English literature at Oxford University. In part, therefore, the work is a meditation on time and how it changes our perspective on the world as a whole and on particular cultural artifacts and works of art. This is apposite, since one of Tarkovsky's most central preoccupations was that of time (he called his book on the process of making films Sculpting in Time). Dyer refers to the long drawing-out of takes by Tarkovsky as being a manifestation of 'Tarkovsky time'.

Early on in the process of writing the book Dyer considered a structure where he could divide up his discussion into the film's 142 shots, but instead discovered that his own lines of argument led off in tangents that prevented such a narrowly constructed work. The discursive and digressive structure of the work in a sense mirrors the journey undertaken by the characters in Tarkosky's film who try to gain access to an omnipotent 'Room' which has the power to grant all our wishes that is rumoured to lie at the centre of the Zone itself; a quest whose object seems to become further away as they advance and progress. As well as general and universal themes regarding the human condition in the film, Dyer also discusses other ways in which it has often been interpreted, such as a depiction of the absurdities and confusion of life under late period Communism or a foreshadowing of the zones of exclusion set up during the 1986 Chernobyl disaster.
