= But Beautiful: A Book About Jazz =

1991 book about jazz and jazz musicians by Geoff Dye

- Author: Geoff Dyer
- Publication date: 1991
- ISBN: 0-349-11005-0

But Beautiful is a book about jazz and jazz musicians by Geoff Dyer. First published in 1991, it is the first of Dyer's so-called "genre-defying" works.

== Summary ==
Like Michael Ondaatje's Coming Through Slaughter, But Beautiful takes a fictionalised look at jazz. Divided into seven sections each covering a different legendary jazz figure, it uses historical details, photographs and music to paint the self-destruction and inspiration behind genius. Short vignettes of Duke Ellington and Harry Carney's famous between-gig road trips are interspersed throughout. It concludes with a seven-part analysis of jazz styles and influences that reads more like conventional music criticism.

== Reception ==
The book is one of Dyer's most acclaimed works. Pianist Keith Jarrett said it was:

"The only book about jazz that I have recommended to my friends. It is a little gem with the distinction of being 'about' jazz rather than 'on' jazz. If closeness to the material determines a great solo, Mr. Dyer's book is one."

In The New York Times Book Review, critic Ralph Blumenthal wrote, "Like the music he evokes so lyrically, Geoff Dyer's But Beautiful, a quasi-biographical critique of nine jazz legends, relies heavily on improvisation. You don't have to be a jazz buff to savor this book—but you may be one when you're done." In The New York Times, critic Richard Bernstein discussed the book's "electrifying, typically gemlike passages of criticism," and called the work, "marvelously lyrical."

== Awards ==
The book was one of the winners of a 1992 Somerset Maugham Award.

== Cultural references ==
"But Beautiful" is also the name of a jazz composition by Johnny Burke and Jimmy Van Heusen and was recorded by two of the book's subjects (Ben Webster and Art Pepper), as well as such notables as Nancy Wilson, Bill Evans, Frank Sinatra and Freddie Hubbard.

== Jazz musicians covered ==
- Duke Ellington and Harry Carney
- Lester Young
- Thelonious Monk
- Bud Powell
- Ben Webster
- Chet Baker
- Art Pepper
- Charles Mingus
