= Zona, West Virginia =

Zona
- Unincorporated community
- Location within the state of West Virginia Zona (the United States)
- Coordinates: 38°43′19″N 81°27′20″W
- Country: United States
- State: West Virginia
- County: Roane
- Elevation: 784 ft (239 m)
- Time zone: UTC-5 (Eastern (EST))
  - Summer (DST): UTC-4 (EDT)
- GNIS ID: 1550002

Zona is an unincorporated community in Roane County, West Virginia, United States.

The community was named after Zona S. Daniell, a local schoolchild.
