= Zuma, Sudan =

Coordinates: 18.366667°N 31.75°E

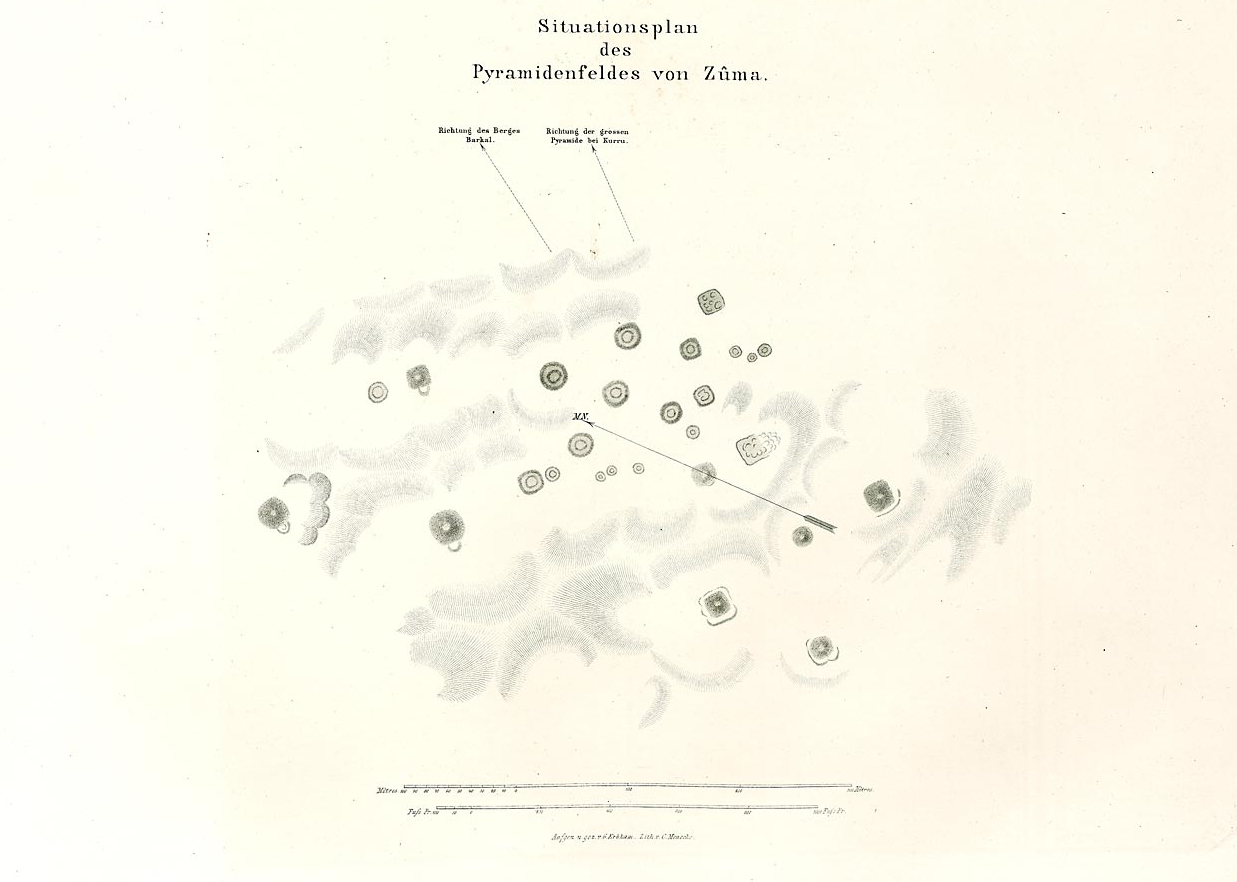
Situation plan of the Ez-Zuma cemetery by Karl Richard Lepsius from the mid-19th century

Zuma (el-Zuma) is an archaeological site including a village and burial ground about 25 miles (40 km) downstream from Jebel Barkal in what is now Sudan. It lies about 10 kilometres (6.2 mi) south of El-Kurru, in the Napatan Region, on the right side of the Nile. The cemetery was visited several times by researchers in the last two hundred years, but there were only brief descriptions written, and no excavations. The tumuli field at el-Zuma has been known, erroneously, as the “El-Zuma Pyramids” since the first half of the 20th century. A plan was drawn up during the expedition of Karl Richard Lepsius. UNESCO inscribed Zuma's 20 hectares as a world cultural heritage site in 2003.

Modern, systematic excavations began in December 2004 by a Polish-Sudanese team led by Mahmoud el-Tayeb from the Polish Centre of Mediterranean Archaeology, University of Warsaw within the "Early Makuria Research Project". On the surface, 29 grave mounds (tumuli) are seen. Three grave types are distinguished, mainly based on the grave mound. Type I consists of hills, which are completely covered with stones. The grave mounds have a diameter of 25–53 metres (82–174 ft) and were 6–13.5 metres (20–44 ft) high. The hills of type II have a diameter of 21–31 metres (69–102 ft). They are built of sand and loose stones. A stone ring that goes around the hill keeps them together. The underground burial shaft is M-shaped (when viewed from above) and has two chambers, one for the funeral and the other for the grave goods. The hills of type III are flat and less than 1 metre (3 ft 3 in) high. They have a diameter of 9–20 metres (30–66 ft) and only a single grave chamber. The same types were distinguished for tumuli graves at El-Detti, which is also studied as part of the "Early Makuria Research Project". All grave at el-Zuma chambers were robbed. However, they showed evidence of having contained pottery, beads, metal fragments and animal bones. Ceramics found in the graves dated late 5th and early 6th centuries.

The differences between the three types of graves point to the different social standing of the people buried in them rather than to a different chronology. The eight largest tumuli probably belonged to the representatives of the elite. The most spectacular are Tumuli 6 and 7 where the tunnels are divided by a row of pillars. These two graves are located in the highest part of the site.
