= Stalker (1979 film) =

1979 Soviet epic science fantasy film by Andrei Tarkovsky

- Original release poster
- Russian: Сталкер
- Directed by: Andrei Tarkovsky
- Screenplay by: Arkady Strugatsky; Boris Strugatsky
- Based on: Roadside Picnic by: Arkady Strugatsky; Boris Strugatsky
- Produced by: Aleksandra Demidova (Note: In the Soviet Union the role of a producer was different from that in Western countries and more similar to the role of a line producer or a unit production manager.)
- Starring: Alexander Kaidanovsky; Anatoly Solonitsyn; Alisa Freindlich; Nikolai Grinko
- Cinematography: Alexander Knyazhinsky
- Edited by: Lyudmila Feiginova
- Music by: Eduard Artemyev
- Production company: Mosfilm
- Distributed by: Goskino
- Release date: 25 May 1979
- Running time: 161 minutes
- Country: Soviet Union
- Language: Russian
- Budget: 1 million Rbls
- Box office: 4.3 million tickets

Stalker (Russian: Сталкер, IPA: [ˈstaɫkʲɪr]) is a 1979 Soviet post-apocalyptic drama film directed by Andrei Tarkovsky with a screenplay written by Arkady and Boris Strugatsky, loosely based on their 1972 novel Roadside Picnic. The film tells the story of an expedition led by a figure known as the "Stalker" (Alexander Kaidanovsky), who guides his two clients—a melancholic writer (Anatoly Solonitsyn) and a professor (Nikolai Grinko)—through a hazardous wasteland to a mysterious restricted site known simply as the "Zone", where there supposedly exists a room which grants a person's innermost desires. The film combines elements of science fiction and fantasy with dramatic, philosophical, and psychological themes.

The film was shot over a year on film stock that was later discovered to be unusable and had to be almost entirely reshot with a new cinematographer, Alexander Knyazhinsky. Stalker was released by Goskino in May 1979. Upon release, the film garnered praise in the Soviet and Warsaw Pact press, but only mixed reviews in the West. In later years it was recognised as one of the greatest films of all time. In the decennial critics' and directors' polls published by the British Film Institute's magazine Sight and Sound in 2022, Stalker placed 43rd and 14th, respectively. The film sold over 4 million tickets, mostly in the Soviet Union, against a budget of 1 million roubles.

== Plot ==
"The Zone" is a huge tract of open land where the normal laws of physics supposedly do not apply, containing supernatural hazards. At the heart of the Zone lies a "Room" that is said to grant the wishes of anyone who steps inside. The government has fenced off the Zone, subjecting "Stalkers", people who illegally guide others through the Zone, to harsh prison time if caught crossing the border.

One Stalker has just returned from a long prison sentence to his wife and daughter. To his wife's horror, a disaffected writer and a physics professor immediately hire the Stalker to take them through the Zone. Needing the money, he meets the Writer and Professor in a rundown bar-café, warning them that they must do what he says to survive the dangers that lie ahead. He explains that the Zone is a living thing that visitors must respect.

The trio evades the Zone's military guards by following a train through the gate, riding through the Zone's vast wilderness on a railway work car. (Note: The film goes from sepia or a similar high-contrast brown monochrome (set outside the Zone) to full color at this point. Most scenes in the Zone are in color, with the exception of some reflective closeups of the Stalker's face which revert to sepia. Also, toward the end, scenes outside the Zone featuring the Stalker's daughter are shot in color.) The Zone contains such human remnants as old abandoned industrial facilities, corpses, guns, and tanks. The Stalker cautiously tests for anomalies as they painstakingly make their way toward the Room, though nothing unusual occurs.

The three men discuss their reasons for wanting to visit the Room as they travel: the Writer fears losing his inspiration, the calm Professor hopes to analyze the Zone in order to win a Nobel Prize, and the Stalker insists he has no motive beyond the altruistic aim of aiding the desperate to their desires. He mentions that his mentor, another Stalker named "Porcupine", obtained great riches by entering the Room but then hanged himself when he returned home.

The trio draw lots to determine that the Writer will go first through an especially long, dark, ominous passageway that the Stalker calls the "meat grinder". Nervously, the Writer passes through without harm, shocking the Stalker, who reveals that the meat grinder kills anyone the Zone deems morally unworthy. The Writer forges ahead and delivers a soliloquy directly to camera about the futility of knowledge and feeling overwhelmed and criticized by other people. He returns to the others, and the Stalker reveals that Porcupine sent a brother ahead of him into the meat grinder, where the brother was killed. The Stalker then recites a poem about never being satisfied, and the Writer rages at the Stalker for assuming he was morally unworthy.

Suddenly, a phone in the antechamber rings. The surprised Professor uses it to call an old enemy scientist, gloating about finding a bomb the scientist had hidden, which the Professor previously worked on. As the trio prepare to enter the Room, the Professor reveals he has brought the 20-kiloton bomb in his backpack to destroy the Room and therefore prevent evil men from abusing it for gain. He blames the Room, the Stalkers, and their clients for the recent rise of crime, political strife, and destructive science. After a brief scuffle over the bomb, the Stalker weeps, claiming that only the Room has given him meaning in his otherwise pitiful life and that it is the last beacon of hope for humanity.

The Writer deduces that the Stalker's mentor Porcupine hanged himself because of the guilt the Room caused him when it presented him with riches rather than the return of his deceased brother, showing that Porcupine subconsciously cared more about wealth than love. Thus, the Room's ability to grant one's deepest and most secret desire additionally provides a window into the morality of one's soul. The Writer suggests that it is impossible to use the Room for selfish reasons because nobody can know their deepest subconscious desires. The Professor's fears soothed, he dismantles the bomb. The three men sit just outside the Room in silence; none attempt to enter it.

The Stalker, the Writer, and the Professor are met back outside the Zone at the bar-café by the Stalker's wife and daughter. The Stalker returns home in total distress, lamenting to his wife how humanity has lost its capacity for faith, which is needed to traverse the Zone and live a good life. As the Stalker sleeps, his wife contemplates their relationship in a soliloquy delivered to the camera. She says that she would prefer an interesting life of hardship over an easy, boring one. The couple's daughter sits alone, while a love poem by Fyodor Tyutchev is recited through voice-over. The girl appears to use psychokinesis to push three drinking glasses across the table, a train shakes the room as it passes by, and Beethoven's "Ode to Joy" is heard.

== Cast ==
- Alexander Kaidanovsky as the Stalker
- Anatoly Solonitsyn as the Writer
- Alisa Freindlich as the Stalker's wife
- Nikolai Grinko as the Professor
- Natasha Abramova as Martyshka, the Stalker's daughter
- Faime Jurno as the Writer's companion
- Evgeny Kostin as Lyuger, owner of the bar-café (credited as E. Kostin)
- Raimo Rendi as the patrolman

== Title ==
The meaning of the word "stalker" was derived from its use by the Strugatsky brothers in their novel Roadside Picnic, upon which the movie is based. In Roadside Picnic, "Stalker" was a common nickname for men engaged in the illegal enterprise of prospecting for and smuggling alien artefacts out of the "Zone". According to Boris Strugatsky, "prospectors" and "trappers" were potential word choices before "stalker" was decided on, which was at least partially inspired by Rudyard Kipling's character "Stalky" in his Stalky & Co. stories, of which both authors were fans. Their calque of the English word into Russian is pronounced slightly differently, and it came into common usage in Russian after being "coined" by the authors. Tarkovsky also wrote of the English word, "Stalker is from the word 'to stalk'—to creep" in a 1976 diary entry. In the film, a "stalker" is a professional guide to the Zone, someone having the ability and desire to cross the border into the dangerous and forbidden place for a reason.

== Themes and interpretations ==
In a review in Slant Magazine, the critic, Nick Schager, describes the film as a "dense, complex, often-contradictory, and endlessly pliable allegory about human consciousness, the necessity for faith in an increasingly secular, rational world, and the ugly, unpleasant dreams and desires that reside in the hearts of men", while conceding that the obliqueness of the imagery renders definitive interpretation "both pointless... [and] somewhat futile".

Several critics have identified the nature of human desire as the theme of the film. James Berardinelli interprets the film as suggesting that "one's innermost desire may not be what one thinks it is and that one may be better off not achieving it", while Schager describes the film as capturing "the essence of what man is made of... a yearning for something that's simultaneously beyond our reach and yet intrinsic to every one of us".

Geoff Dyer argues the Stalker is "seeking asylum from the world", and says that "while the film may not be about the gulag, it is haunted by memories of the camps, from the overlap of vocabulary ("Zona", "the meat grinder") to the Stalker's Zek-style shaved head".

Writer Lilya Kaganovsky compares the film's mysterious Zone with the Chernobyl exclusion zone that was established in 1986 (seven years after the release of the film) in the aftermath of the Chernobyl disaster, and some of the people employed to take care of the Chernobyl power plant referred to themselves as "stalkers".

Midway in the film, the Stalker has an interior monologue in which he quotes the entire section 76 of Laozi's Tao Te Ching, the text of which characterizes softness and pliancy as qualities of a newborn, hence, new life; hardness and strength, on the contrary, are qualities nearing death. ("Man, when he enters life, is soft and weak. When he dies he is hard and strong.")

Slavistic Nils Åke Nilsson says that in the context of late Soviet stagnation, Tarkovsky makes a contrast between the oppressive dystopia of the outside world—marked by industrial decay, pollution, alienation, and political repression—and the Zone, a realm of beauty and mystery. In conjunction with the Room, they act as representations of new possibilities, a utopia amidst the anti-utopian world of modern society, offering an escape from the constraints of the decaying society. The film reflects the disillusionment of late socialism, which fell short of the communist utopia, resulting in a stagnant and sterile reality.

In this film, Tarkovsky wishes to emphasize two essentially human aspects, faith and love. He believes that faith "cannot be dissolved or broken down, [it] forms like a crystal in the soul of each of us and constitutes its great worth," and that when humans feel that there is no more hope in the world, love is what proves to them otherwise. The Writer feels as though the world has become mundane and ordinary, and has become cynical regarding it; he desires to be shaken by the unknown that is the Zone. What ends up surprising him is not the Zone, but instead, the Stalker's wife and her faithfulness to the stalker even after all he has put her through. "Her love and her devotion are that final miracle which can be set against the unbelief, cynicism, moral vacuum poisoning the modern world, of which both the Writer and the Scientist are victims." In Tarkovsky's films, he believes that it is his responsibility to make his viewers aware and reflect on their need to love and to give their love.

== Style ==
Like Tarkovsky's other films, Stalker relies on long takes with slow, subtle camera movement, rejecting the use of rapid montage. The film contains 142 shots in 163 minutes, with an average shot length of more than one minute and many shots lasting for more than four minutes. (Note: For comparison, modern Hollywood films typically have an average shot length of four to six seconds.)

== Production ==
=== Writing ===
After reading the novel Roadside Picnic, by Arkady and Boris Strugatsky, Tarkovsky initially recommended it to a friend, the film director Mikhail Kalatozov, thinking Kalatozov might be interested in adapting it into a film. Kalatozov abandoned the project when he could not obtain the rights to the novel. Tarkovsky then became very interested in adapting the novel and expanding its concepts. He hoped it would allow him to make a film which conformed to the classical Aristotelian unity: a single action, on a single location, within 24 hours (single point in time).

Tarkovsky viewed the idea of the Zone as a dramatic tool to draw out the personalities of the three protagonists, particularly the psychological damage from everything that happens to the idealistic views of the Stalker as he finds himself unable to make others happy: "This, too, is what Stalker is about: the hero goes through moments of despair when his faith is shaken; but every time he comes to a renewed sense of his vocation to serve people who have lost their hopes and illusions."

The film departs considerably from the novel. According to an interview with Tarkovsky in 1979, the film has basically nothing in common with the novel except for the two words "Stalker" and "Zone".

=== Filming ===
In an interview on the MK2 DVD, the production designer, Rashit Safiullin, recalled that Tarkovsky spent a year shooting all the outdoor scenes. However, when the crew returned to Moscow, they found that the film had been improperly developed and their footage was unusable. The film had been shot on new Kodak 5247 stock with which Soviet laboratories were not very familiar. Even before the film stock problem was discovered, relations between Tarkovsky and Stalker's first cinematographer, Georgy Rerberg, had deteriorated. After seeing the poorly developed material, Tarkovsky fired Rerberg. Safiullin contends that Tarkovsky was so despondent at having to discard all the outdoor work that he wanted to abandon further work on the film.

After the loss of the film stock, the Soviet film boards wanted to shut the film down, but Tarkovsky came up with a solution: he asked to be allowed to make a two-part film, which meant additional deadlines and more funds. Tarkovsky ended up reshooting almost all of the film with a new cinematographer, Alexander Knyazhinsky. According to Safiullin, the finished version of Stalker is completely different from the one Tarkovsky originally shot.

The documentary film Rerberg and Tarkovsky: The Reverse Side of "Stalker" by Igor Mayboroda offers a different interpretation of the relationship between Rerberg and Tarkovsky. Rerberg felt that Tarkovsky was not ready for this script. He told Tarkovsky to rewrite the script in order to achieve a good result. Tarkovsky ignored him and continued shooting. After several arguments, Tarkovsky sent Rerberg home. Ultimately, Tarkovsky shot Stalker three times, consuming over 5,000 metres (16,000 ft) of film. People who have seen both the first version shot by Rerberg (as Director of Photography) and the final theatrical release say that they are almost identical. Tarkovsky sent home other crew members in addition to Rerberg, excluding them from the credits, as well.

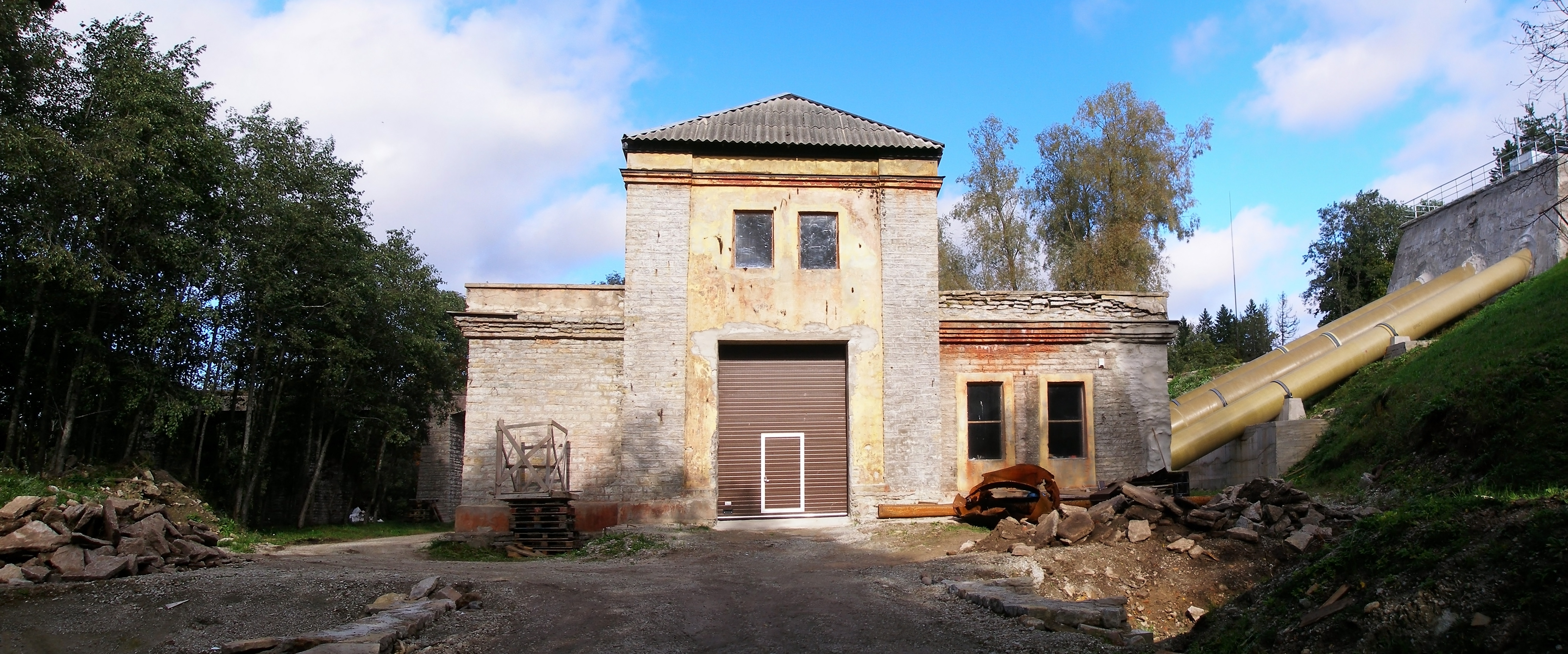
One of the deserted hydro power plants near Tallinn, Estonia, where the central part of Stalker was shot

The central part of the film, in which the characters travel within the Zone, was shot in a few days at two deserted hydropower plants on the Jägala river near Tallinn, Estonia. The shot before they enter the Zone is an old Flora chemical factory in the center of Tallinn, next to the old Rotermann salt storage (now Museum of Estonian Architecture), and the former Tallinn Power Plant, now Tallinn Creative Hub, where a memorial plate of the film was set up in 2008. Some shots within the Zone were filmed in Maardu, next to the Iru Power Plant, while the shot with the gates to the Zone was filmed in Lasnamäe, next to Punane Street behind the Idakeskus. Other shots were filmed near the Tallinn–Narva highway bridge on the Pirita river. A small set was built in Moscow not far from the CHPP-20 thermal power plant for the scene exiting the bar.

Several people involved in the film production, and possibly Tarkovsky himself, died from causes that some crew members attributed to the film's long shooting schedule in toxic locations. Sound designer Vladimir Sharun recalled:

We were shooting near Tallinn in the area around the small river Jägala with a half-functioning hydroelectric station. Up the river was a chemical plant and it poured out poisonous liquids downstream. There is even this shot in Stalker: snow falling in the summer and white foam floating down the river. In fact it was some horrible poison. Many women in our crew got allergic reactions on their faces. Tarkovsky died from cancer of the right bronchial tube. And Anatoly Solonitsyn too. That it was all connected to the location shooting for Stalker became clear to me when Larisa Tarkovskaya died from the same illness in Paris.

== Soundtrack ==
The Stalker film score was composed by Eduard Artemyev, who had also composed the scores for Tarkovsky's previous films Solaris and Mirror. For Stalker, Artemyev composed and recorded two different versions of the score. The first score was done with an orchestra alone but was rejected by Tarkovsky. The second score that was used in the final film was created on a synthesizer along with traditional instruments that were manipulated using sound effects.

In the final film score, the boundaries between music and sound were blurred, as natural sounds and music interact to the point where they are indistinguishable. In fact, many of the natural sounds were not production sounds but were created by Artemyev on his synthesizer.

For Tarkovsky, music was more than just a parallel illustration of the visual image. He believed that music distorts and changes the emotional tone of a visual image while not changing the meaning. He also believed that in a film with complete theoretical consistency, music will have no place and that instead music is replaced by sounds. According to Tarkovsky, he aimed at this consistency and moved into this direction in Stalker and Nostalghia.

In addition to the original monophonic soundtrack, the Russian Cinema Council (Ruscico) created an alternative 5.1 surround sound track for the 2001 DVD release. In addition to remixing the mono soundtrack, music and sound effects were removed and added in several scenes. Music was added to the scene where the three are traveling to the Zone on a motorized draisine. In the opening and the final scene Beethoven's Ninth Symphony was removed and in the opening scene in Stalker's house ambient sounds were added, changing the original soundtrack, in which this scene was completely silent except for the sound of a train.

=== Film score ===
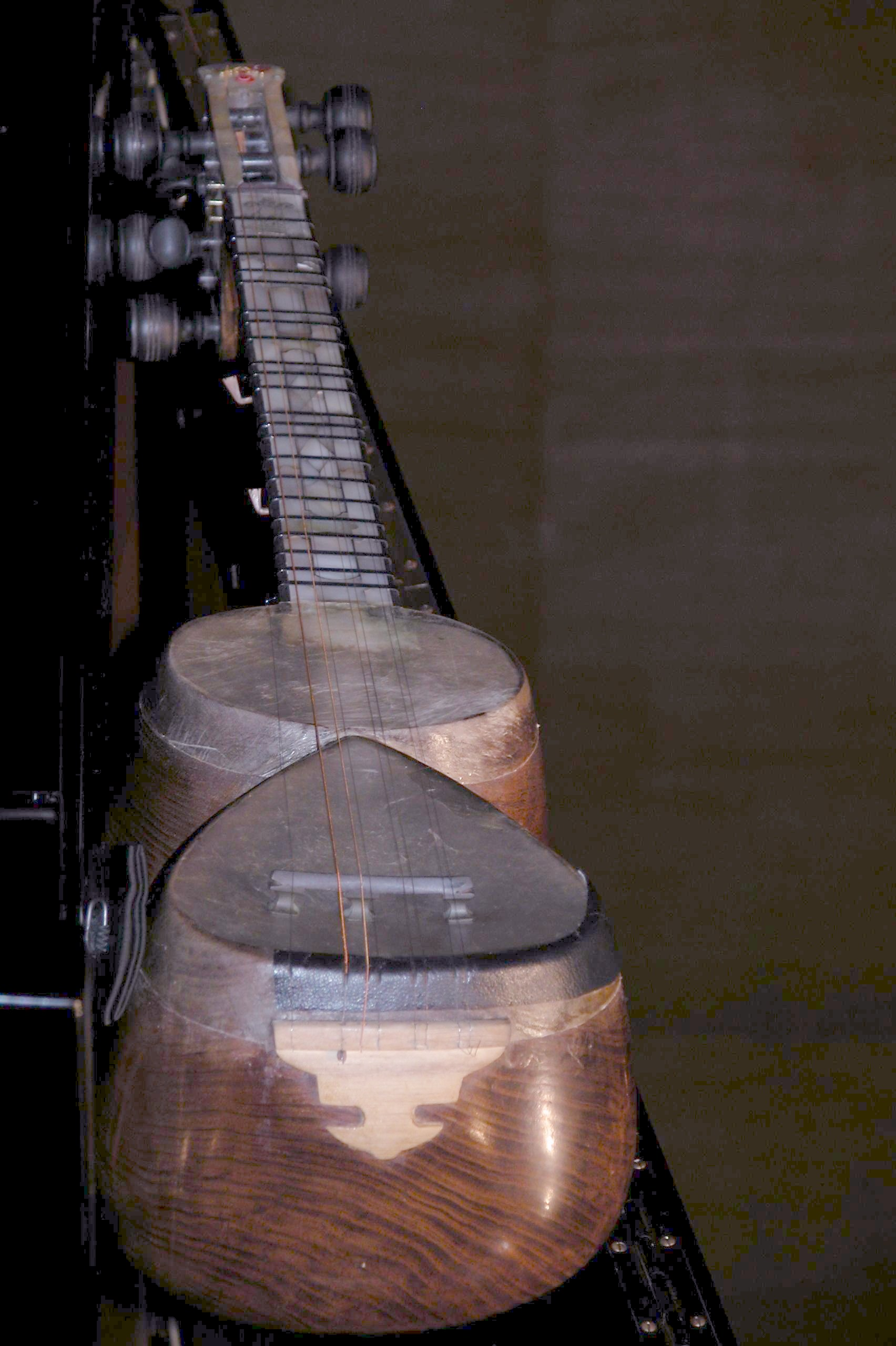
Azerbaijani tar is used in the Stalker theme.

Initially, Tarkovsky had no clear understanding of the musical atmosphere of the final film and only an approximate idea where in the film the music was to be. Even after he had shot all the material he continued his search for the ideal film score, wanting a combination of Oriental and Western music. In a conversation with Artemyev he explained that he needed music that reflects the idea that although the East and the West can coexist, they are not able to understand each other. One of Tarkovsky's ideas was to perform Western music on Oriental instruments (or vice versa). Artemyev proposed to try this idea with the motet Pulcherrima Rosa by an anonymous 14th century Italian composer dedicated to the Virgin Mary.

In its original form Tarkovsky did not perceive the motet as suitable for the film and asked Artemyev to give it an Oriental sound. Later, Tarkovsky proposed to invite musicians from Armenia and Azerbaijan and to let them improvise on the melody of the motet. A musician was invited from Azerbaijan who played the main melody on a tar based on mugham, accompanied by orchestral background music written by Artemyev. Tarkovsky, who, unusually for him, attended the full recording session, rejected the final result as not what he was looking for.

Rethinking their approach, they finally found the solution in a theme that would create a state of inner calmness and inner satisfaction, or as Tarkovsky said "space frozen in a dynamic equilibrium". Artemyev knew about a musical piece from Indian classical music where a prolonged and unchanged background tone is performed on a tanpura. As this gave Artemyev the impression of frozen space, he used this inspiration and created a background tone on his synthesizer similar to the background tone performed on the tanpura. The tar then improvised on the background sound, together with a flute as a European, Western instrument. To mask the obvious combination of European and Oriental instruments he passed the foreground music through the effect channels of his SYNTHI 100 synthesizer. These effects included modulating the sound of the flute and lowering the speed of the tar, so that what Artemyev called "the life of one string" could be heard. Tarkovsky was amazed by the result, especially liking the sound of the tar, and used the theme without any alterations in the film.

=== Sound design ===
The title sequence is accompanied by Artemyev's main theme. The opening sequence of the film showing Stalker's room is mostly silent. Periodically one hears what could be a train. The sound becomes louder and clearer over time until the sound and the vibrations of objects in the room give a sense of a train's passing by without the train being visible. This aural impression is quickly subverted by the muffled sound of Beethoven's Symphony No. 9. The source of this music is unclear, thus setting the tone for the blurring of reality in the film. For this part of the film Tarkovsky was also considering music by Richard Wagner or the Marseillaise.

In an interview with Tonino Guerra in 1979, Tarkovsky said that he wanted, "... music that is more or less popular, that expresses the movement of the masses, the theme of humanity's social destiny ... But this music must be barely heard beneath the noise, in a way that the spectator is not aware of it."

I would like most of the noise and sound to be composed by a composer. In the film, for example, the three people undertake a long journey in a railway car. I'd like that the noise of the wheels on the rails not be the natural sound but elaborated upon by the composer with electronic music. At the same time, one mustn't be aware of music, nor natural sounds.

— Andrei Tarkovsky, interviewed by Tonino Guerra in 1979.

The journey into the Zone on a motorized rail car features a disconnection between the visual image and the sound. The presence of the rail car is registered only through the clanking sound of the wheels on the tracks. Neither the rail car nor the scenery passing by is shown, since the camera is focused on the faces of the characters. This disconnection draws the audience into the inner world of the characters and transforms the physical journey into an inner journey. This effect on the audience is reinforced by Artemyev's synthesizer effects, which make the clanking wheels sound less and less natural as the journey progresses. When the three arrive in the Zone initially, it appears to be silent. Only after some time, and only slightly audibly can one hear the sound of a distant river, the sound of the blowing wind, or the occasional cry of an animal. These sounds grow richer and more audible while the Stalker makes his first venture into the Zone, as if the sound draws him toward the Zone. The sparseness of sounds in the Zone draws attention to specific sounds, which, as in other scenes, are largely disconnected from the visual image. Animals can be heard in the distance but are never shown. A breeze can be heard, but no visual reference is shown. This effect is reinforced by occasional synthesizer effects which meld with the natural sounds and blur the boundaries between artificial and alien sounds and the sounds of nature.

During the journey in the Zone, the sound of water becomes more and more prominent, which, combined with the visual image, presents the Zone as a drenched world. In an interview Tarkovsky dismissed the idea that water has a symbolic meaning in his films, saying that rain is so prominent in his films because it is always raining in Russia. In another interview, on the film Nostalghia, however, he said "Water is a mysterious element, a single molecule of which is very photogenic. It can convey movement and a sense of change and flux." Emerging from the tunnel called the "meat grinder" by the Stalker, they arrive at the entrance of their destination, the Room. Here, as in the rest of the film, sound is constantly changing and not necessarily connected to the visual image. The journey ends with the three sitting beside the door to the Room in silence. When the sound resumes, it is again the sound of water but with a different timbre, softer and gentler, as if to give a sense of catharsis and hope. The transition back to the world outside the Zone is supported by sound. While the camera still shows a pool of water inside the Zone, the audience begins to hear the sound of a train and Ravel's Boléro, reminiscent of the opening scene. The soundscape of the world outside the Zone is the same as before, characterized by train wheels, foghorns of a ship and train whistles. The film ends as it began, with the sound of a train passing by, accompanied by the muffled sound of Beethoven's Symphony No. 9, this time the Ode to Joy from the final moments of the symphony. As in the rest of the film the disconnect between the visual image and the sound leaves the audience unclear whether the sound is real or an illusion.

== Reception ==
=== Box office ===
Stalker sold 4.3 million tickets in the Soviet Union.

=== Critical response ===
Upon its release the film's reception was less than favorable. Officials at Goskino, a government group otherwise known as the State Committee for Cinematography, were critical of the film. On being told that Stalker should be faster and more dynamic, Tarkovsky replied: "The film needs to be slower and duller at the start so that the viewers who walked into the wrong theatre have time to leave before the main action starts." The Goskino representative then stated that he was trying to give the point of view of the audience. Tarkovsky supposedly retorted: "I am only interested in the views of two people: one is called Bresson and one called Bergman."

More recently, reviews of the film have been highly positive. On review aggregator Rotten Tomatoes, Stalker is rated at 100% based on 46 reviews with an average rating of 8.8/10. Its critical consensus states, "Stalker is a complex, oblique parable that draws unforgettable images and philosophical musings from its sci-fi/thriller setting." Metacritic assigned the film a weighted average score of 85 out of 100, based on 17 critics, indicating "universal acclaim". It earned a place in the British Film Institute's "100 Greatest Films of All Time" poll conducted for Sight & Sound in September 2012. The group's critics listed Stalker at joint No. 29. Directors ranked it at No. 30. In the most recent 2022 edition of Sight & Sound's Greatest Films of All Time list, the film ranked 43rd in the critics' poll, and 14th in the directors' poll. In The Guardian, Geoff Dyer described the film as "synonymous both with cinema's claims to high art and a test of the viewer's ability to appreciate it as such". Critic Derek Adams of the Time Out Film Guide has compared Stalker to Francis Ford Coppola's Apocalypse Now, also released in 1979, and argued that "as a journey to the heart of darkness" Stalker looks "a good deal more persuasive than Coppola's." Slant Magazine reviewer Nick Schager has praised the film as an "endlessly pliable allegory about human consciousness".

In 2018, the film was voted the 49th greatest non-English-language film of all time in a poll by BBC Culture involving 209 critics in 43 countries.

=== Accolades ===
The film was awarded the Prize of the Ecumenical Jury at the 1980 Cannes Film Festival, and the Audience Jury Award – Special Mention at Fantasporto.

== Home media ==
RUSCICO produced a version for the international market containing the film on two DVDs with remastered audio and video. It contains the original Russian audio in an enhanced Dolby Digital 5.1 remix, with a later revision adding the original mono version. The DVD also contains subtitles in 13 languages and interviews with cameraman Alexander Knyazhinsky, painter and production designer Rashit Safiullin and composer Eduard Artemyev. The contents of the discs have been licensed to various companies, including Artificial Eye in the United Kingdom, MK2 in France, Llamentol in Spain, Spectrum Entertainment in South Korea, and both Image Entertainment and Kino International in the United States (with the latter's release also including English and French voice-overs).

The Criterion Collection released a remastered edition DVD and Blu-ray on 17 July 2017. Included in the special features is an interview with film critic Geoff Dyer, author of the book Zona: A Book About a Film About a Journey to a Room.

== Influence and legacy ==
=== Cultural events ===
- The film heavily influenced the Cacophony Society, which began in 1986 in the San Francisco Bay Area and which organized "Zone Trips" for participants.
- The first burning of a wooden, symbolic man at Black Rock Desert, Nevada, occurred on "Zone Trip Number 4" in 1990. This occasion evolved into an enormous annual festival of arts, music, and culture called Burning Man.

=== Film and television ===
- The French filmmaker Chris Marker used Tarkovsky's concept of "The Zone" from the film for his film, Sans Soleil (1983).
- Stalker, the Russian International Human Rights Film Festival, was named after the film at its founding in 1995.
- Jonathan Nolan, co-creator of Westworld (2016–2022), cites Stalker as an influence on his work for the HBO series.
- Annihilation (2018), a science fiction psychological horror film written and directed by Alex Garland, although based on the eponymous novel by Jeff VanderMeer, for some critics seems to have obvious similarities with the Roadside Picnic and Stalker. However, such notions prompted the author of the Annihilation novel, upon which the movie is based, to state that his story "is 100% NOT a tribute to Picnic/Stalker" via his official Twitter account.
- The documentary film Shadowland (2024) portrays an esoteric Pyrenean community led by Richard Stanley, who borrows the Zone concept both as a personal interpretation of the supernatural and as a tool of manipulation.

=== Literature ===
- In 2012, the English writer Geoff Dyer published Zona: A Book About a Film About a Journey to a Room drawing together his personal observations as well as critical insights about the film and the experience of watching it.

=== Music ===
- Stalker was the inspiration for the 1995 album of the same title by Robert Rich and B. Lustmord, which has been noted for its eerie soundscapes and dark ambience.
- The lyrics of the 2013 album Pelagial by the progressive metal band The Ocean are inspired by the film.
- The 2024 song "Tarkovski" by New York band Bodega refers to "The Zone." The title is "a pun on the famous Russian director and skiing," according to vocalist Ben Hozie.
- 80s Argentine post-punk band Don Cornelio y la Zona takes its name from "The Zone".

=== Video games ===
- In 2007, the Ukrainian video-game developer GSC Game World published S.T.A.L.K.E.R.: Shadow of Chernobyl, an open-world, first-person shooter very loosely based on the film, the original novel, and the real-life Chernobyl disaster. While the story in the game differs completely from both the book and the movie, several characters offer parallels to those found in both. The game was a critical and commercial success, selling over 15 million copies through 2021 and leading to two sequels set in a similar environment.
- On 20 November, 2024, S.T.A.L.K.E.R. 2: Heart of Chornobyl, the sequel to S.T.A.L.K.E.R.: Shadow of Chernobyl, was released.
- Pacific Drive is inspired by the novel Roadside Picnic, on which the film was based.

== See also ==
- List of cult films
