= Yamaha Zuma 125 =

Yamaha Zuma
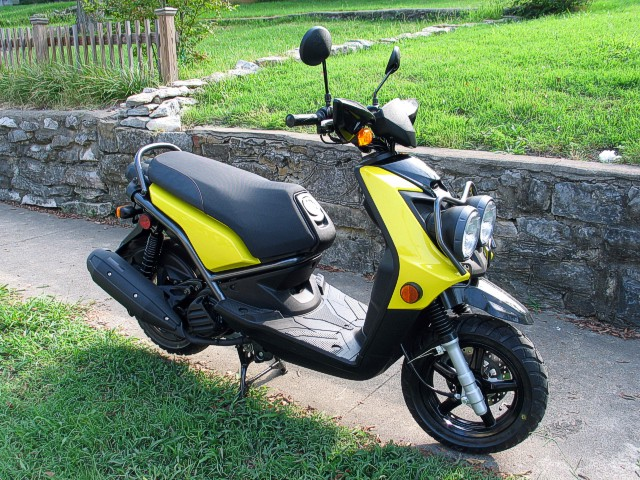
- Manufacturer: Yamaha Motor Company
- Production: 2009-present
- Class: Scooter
- Engine: 125 cc (7.6 cu in) forced air-cooled 4-stroke single cylinder; SOHC, 4-valve; Electronic Fuel Injection; Bore x Stroke - 52.4 x 57.9 mm Compression Ratio = 10:1
- Transmission: Dry centrifugal automatic clutch; V-belt automatic CVT
- Suspension: Front - 27 mm Telescopic Forks; Rear - Dual Shocks
- Brakes: Front - 220 mm disc Rear - drum
- Tires: Front - 120/70-12 51L; Rear - 130/70-12 56L
- Wheelbase: 50.8 in (1,290 mm)
- Dimensions: L: = 75.2 in (1,910 mm); W: 30.1 in (760 mm)
- Seat height: 30.7 in (780 mm)
- Fuel capacity: 1.3 US gal (4.9 L)
- Fuel consumption: 89 mpg_{‑US} (2.6 L/100 km)

The Yamaha Zuma is a scooter introduced by Yamaha Motor Company in September 2008 and updated in 2016.

== Model information ==
The body design of the Zuma is similar to the BW in respect to its overall form and dual headlight configuration. Its size is slightly larger, and it includes a metal bracket around the headlights. The Taiwanese, Japanese and South American models have stacked front lights with a single headlight. The bulbs used are HS1 styled halogen lights.

It is intended as a street-bike, with the capacity for handling light off-road conditions such as unpaved roads. Many of the design components like the steel frame, wide tires, oiled-type air filters, robust shocks, and front/rear off-road-style brush deflectors were included to facilitate both riding conditions.

=== Engine ===
The engine is a 50-125 cc 4-stroke SOHC 4-valve with 10:1 compression. The fuel injection system is similar to the ones installed on most Yamaha bikes, and uses a 24mm injector. The exhaust manifold comes equipped with an O2 sensor. The rated power output is close to 8 bhp (6.0 kW). After the break in period, the Zuma 125 can achieve a maximum speed of around 61 mph (98 km/h).

This same engine (minus the fuel injection) is also used in Yamaha's Cygnus-X scooter. There is currently an established aftermarket with numerous parts that allow the engine to be enlarged up to 287 cc. Depending on driving style and riding conditions, the Zuma's 125 fuel economy is around 89 mpg_{‑US} (2.6 L/100 km).

=== 2016 Update ===
The bike was updated technically and cosmetically in 2016. The dual independent headlamps were replaced by a single unit with integrated dual lamps, one for low beam and one for high beam.
