= Shilovo, Shilovsky District, Ryazan Oblast =

Shilovo Шилово
- Urban-type settlement
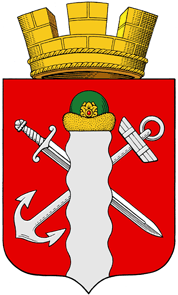
- Coat of arms
- Interactive map of Shilovo
- Location of Shilovo Shilovo (Ryazan Oblast)
- Coordinates: 54.3194°N 40.8878°E
- Country: Russia
- Federal subject: Ryazan Oblast
- Administrative district: Shilovsky District

Population (2010 Census)
  - Total: 15,669
  - Estimate (2023): 13,598 (−13.2%)
- Time zone: UTC+3 (MSK)
- Postal codes: 391500, 391502
- OKTMO ID: 61658151051

Shilovo (Russian: Шилово) is an urban locality (an urban-type settlement) in Shilovsky District of Ryazan Oblast, Russia. Population: 15,669 (2010 census); 16,572 (2002 census); 18,374 (1989 Soviet census).
