= Zuma (surname) =

Zuma is a South African surname. Outside of South Africa, it is also prevalent in several other African countries and in Brazil.

Notable people with this surname include:

- Cyril Zuma (1985–2015), South African footballer
- Brumelda Zuma, daughter of Jacob Zuma
- Duduzane Zuma (born 1982), son of Jacob Zuma
- Honour Zuma, South African media personality and DJ, as Cyan Boujee
- Jacob Zuma (born 1942), former President of South Africa and the African National Congress
- Khulubuse Zuma, South African businessman, nephew of Jacob Zuma
- Luyanda Zuma (born 2001), South African actress and beauty pageant titleholder
- Lwandiswa Zuma (born 1996), South African cricketer
- Nkosazana Dlamini-Zuma (born 1949), South African politician and anti-apartheid activist
- Sibusiso Zuma (born 1975), South African footballer
- Thuthukile Zuma (born 1989), daughter of Jacob Zuma
