= Shilovsky District =

Shilovsky District Шиловский район (Russian)
- District
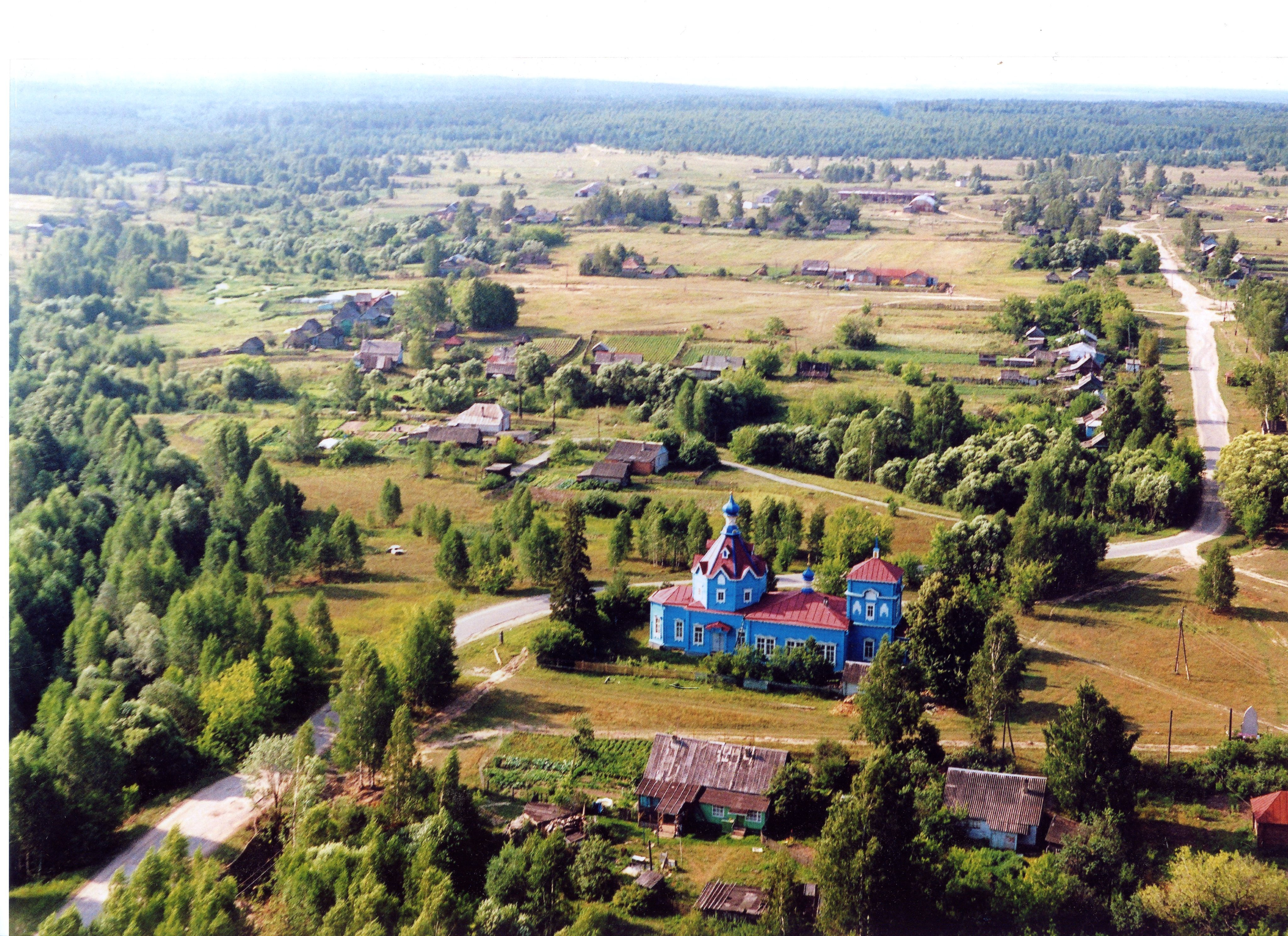
- Bogoroditskaya Church: Borovoe, Shilovsky District

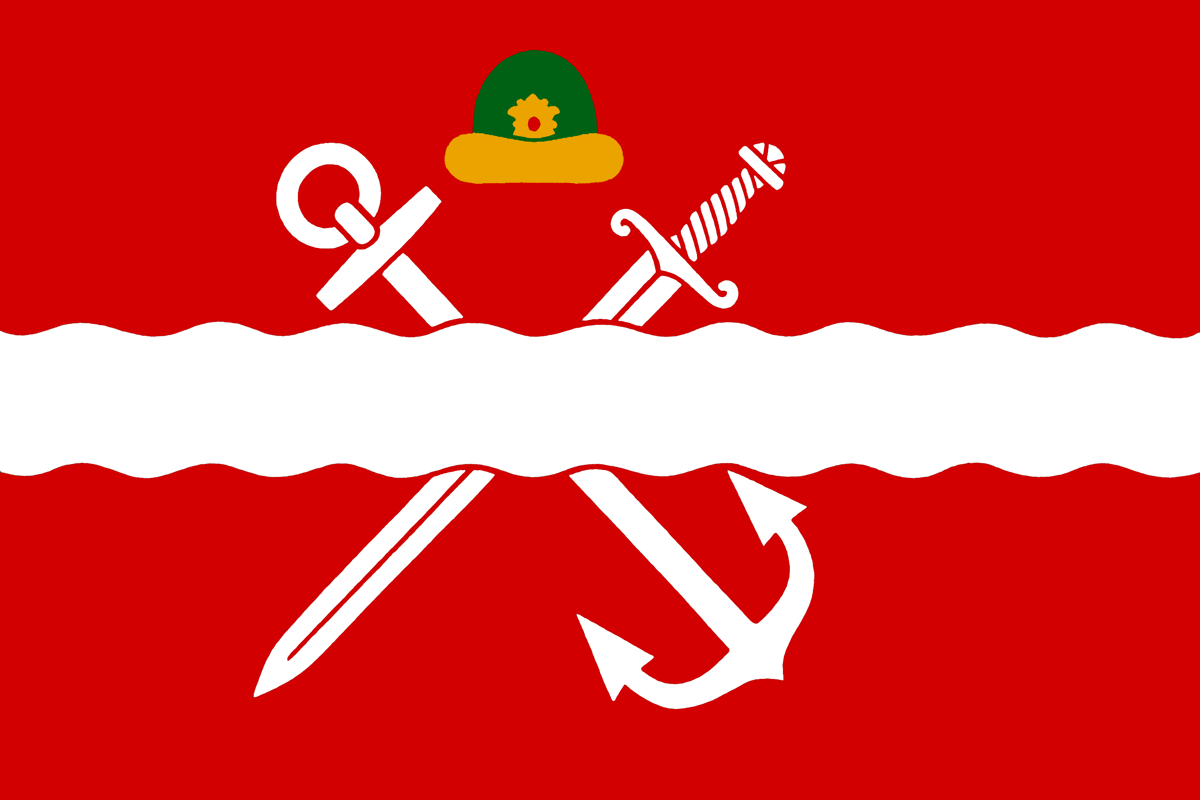
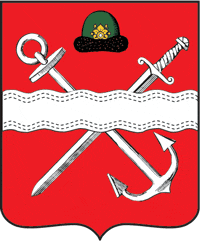
- Flag Coat of arms
- Location of Shilovsky District in Ryazan Oblast
- Coordinates: 54°19′20″N 40°52′30″E
- Country: Russia
- Federal subject: Ryazan Oblast
- Administrative center: Shilovo

Area
  - Total: 2,390 km^{2} (920 sq mi)

Population (2010 Census)
  - Total: 40,334
  - Density: 16.9/km^{2} (43.7/sq mi)
  - Urban: 57.8%
  - Rural: 42.2%

Administrative structure
  - Administrative divisions: 2 Work settlements, 21 Rural okrugs
  - Inhabited localities: 2 urban-type settlements, 106 rural localities

Municipal structure
  - Municipally incorporated as: Shilovsky Municipal District
  - Municipal divisions: 2 urban settlements, 15 rural settlements
- Time zone: UTC+3 (MSK)
- OKTMO ID: 61658000
- Website: http://shilovoadm.ru/

Shilovsky District (Russian: Ши́ловский райо́н) is an administrative and municipal district (raion), one of the twenty-five in Ryazan Oblast, Russia. It is located in the center of the oblast. The area of the district is 2,390 square kilometers (920 sq mi). Its administrative center is the urban locality (a work settlement) of Shilovo. Population: 40,334 (2010 Census); 44,197 (2002 census); 52,202 (1989 Soviet census). The population of Shilovo accounts for 38.9% of the district's total population.
