= List of stage productions directed by Ingmar Bergman =

This is a list of plays directed by Ingmar Bergman.

== Television theatre ==
Year	English title	Original title	Playwright
1957	Mr. Sleeman Is Coming	Herr Sleeman kommer	Hjalmar Bergman
1958	The Venetian	Venetianskan	Anonymous (La Venexiana)
1958	Rabies	Rabies	Olle Hedberg
1960	Storm Weather	Oväder	August Strindberg
1963	Wood Painting	Trämålning	Ingmar Bergman (Wood Painting)
1963	A Dream Play	Ett drömspel	August Strindberg (A Dream Play)
1965	Don Juan	Don Juan	Molière (Dom Juan)
1974	The Misanthrope	Misantropen	Molière (The Misanthrope)
1983	The School for Wives	Hustruskolan	Molière (The School for Wives)
1992	Madame de Sade	Markisinnan de Sade	Yukio Mishima (Madame de Sade)
1993	The Bacchae	Backanterna	Euripides (The Bacchae)
1995	The Last Gasp	Sista skriket	Ingmar Bergman
2000	The Image Makers	Bildmakarna	Per Olov Enquist

== Stage productions ==
List of plays that Ingmar Bergman directed for the stage and/or radio theatre.

- Outward Bound (Mäster Olofs-gården; 1938)
- The Man Who Lived His Life Over (Mäster Olofs-gården; 1939)
- Christmas/Advent (Mäster Olofs-gården; 1939)
- Autumn Rhapsody/The Romantics (Mäster Olofs-gården; 1939)
- Evening Cabaret For the Entire Family (Mäster Olofs-gården; 1939)
- Lucky Per's Journey (Mäster Olofs-gården; 1939)
- The Hangman/The Golden Chariot (Mäster Olofs-gården; 1939)
- Swanwhite (Mäster Olofs-gården; 1940)
- The Merchant of Venice (Norra Latin; 1940)
- The Pelican (Kårhusscenen; 1940)
- Return (at ?; 1940)
- The Hour Glass/The Pot of Broth (Stortorget 3 IV; 1940)
- Macbeth (Mäster-Olofs-gården; 1940)
- The Black Glove (Mäster Olofs-gården; 1940)
- In Betlehem (Mäster Olofs-gården; 1940)
- Bluebird (Medborgarteatern - Sagoteatern; 1941)
- A Midsummer Night's Dream (Medborgarteatern - Sagoteatern; 1941)
- A Ghost Sonata (Medborgarteatern; 1941)
- The Tinder Box (Medborgarhuset; 1941)
- The Father (Folke Walder's tour at Kårhusscenen; 1941)
- A Midsummer Night's Dream (Norra Latin; 1942)
- Death of Punch (SU - Student Theatre; 1942)
- Beppo the Clown (Medborgarhuset/Folkparkerna; 1942)
- Little Red Riding Hood (Medborgarhuset/Folkparkerna; 1942)
- Sniggel snuggel / The Three Stupidities (Medborgarteatern - Sagoteatern; 1942)
- The Fun Fair (Kårhusscenen; 1943)
- Niels Ebbesen (Borgarskolan; 1943)
- En däjlig rosa (A beautiful rose) (Folkparkerna; 1943)
- Geography and Love (Folkparkerna; 1943)
- Just Before Awakening (Kårhusscenen; 1943)
- U-boat 39 (Dramatikerstudion; 1943)
- When the Devil Makes an Offer (SU - Student Theatre; 1943)
- The Tinder Box (Helsingborg City Theatre; 1944)
- Macbeth (Helsingborg City Theatre; 1944)
- When the Devil Makes an Offer (Helsingborg City Theatre; 1944)
- The Ascheberg Widow at Wittskövle (Helsingborg City Theatre; 1944)
- Little Red Riding Hood (Boulevardteatern; 1944)
- The Gambling Hall/Mr. Sleeman Cometh (Borgarskolan; 1944)
- The Hotel Room (Boulevardteatern; 1944)
- The Pelican (Malmö City Theatre, Intiman; 1945)
- Rabies (Helsingborg City Theatre; 1945; later adapted for radio)
- Jacobowsky and the Colonel (Helsingborg City Theatre; 1945)
- Reduce Morals (Helsingborg City Theatre; 1945)
- The Legend (Helsingborg City Theatre; 1945)
- Kriss-Krass-Filibom: New Year's Cabaret (Helsingborg City Theatre; 1945)
- Caligula (Gothenburg City Theatre; 1946)
- Rachel and the Cinema Doorman (Malmö City Theatre; 1946)
- Requiem (Helsingborg City Theatre; 1946; later adapted for radio)
- Unto My Fear (Gothenburg City Theatre; 1947)
- Magic (Gothenburg City Theatre; 1947)
- The Day Ends Early (Gothenburg City Theatre; 1947)
- Mother Love (at ?; 1948)
- Thieves' Carnival (Gothenburg City Theatre; 1948)
- Macbeth (Gothenburg City Theatre; 1948)
- Dancing on the Pier (Gothenburg City Theatre; 1948)
- A Streetcar Named Desire (Gothenburg City Theatre; 1949)
- The Restless Heart (Gothenburg City Theatre; 1949)
- A Shadow / Medea (Intiman; 1950)
- The Three-penny Opera (Intiman; 1950)
- Divine Words (Gothenburg City Theatre; 1950)
- The Rose Tattoo (Norrköping-Linköping City Theatre; 1951)
- The Country Girl (Folkparkerna; 1951)
- Light in the Schack (Royal Dramatic Theatre; 1951)
- The Crown Bride (Malmö City Theatre; 1952)
- Murder at Barjärna (Malmö City Theatre; 1952)
- The Castle (Malmö City Theatre, Intiman; 1953)
- Six Characters in Search of an Author (Malmö City Theatre, Intiman; 1953)
- The Ghost Sonata (Malmö City Theatre; 1954)
- The Monk Strolls in the Meadow (at ?; 1955)
- Twilight Games (Malmö City Theatre; 1954)
- The Merry Widow (Malmö City Theatre; 1954)
- Wood Painting (Malmö City Theatre, Intiman; 1955)
- The Tea House of the August Moon (Malmö City Theatre; 1955)
- Don Juan (Malmö City Theatre; 1955)
- Leah and Rachel (Malmö City Theatre; 1955)
- Erik XIV (Malmö City Theatre; 1956)
- Cat on a Hot Tin Roof (Malmö City Theatre; 1956)
- The Poor Bride (Malmö City Theatre; 1956)
- The Misanthrope (Malmö City Theatre; 1957)
- Peer Gynt (Malmö City Theatre; 1957)
- The People of Värmland (Malmö City Theatre; 1958)
- Ur-Faust (Malmö City Theatre; 1958)
- The Legend (Malmö City Theatre; 1958; later adapted for radio)
- The Rake's Progress (Royal Swedish Opera; 1961)
- The Seagull (Royal Dramatic Theatre; 1961)
- The Legend (Royal Dramatic Theatre; 1963)
- Who's Afraid of Virginia Woolf? (Royal Dramatic Theatre; 1963)
- Hedda Gabler (Royal Dramatic Theatre; 1964)
- Three Knives from Wei (Royal Dramatic Theatre; 1964)
- Tiny Alice (Royal Dramatic Theatre; 1965)
- Don Juan (Royal Dramatic Theatre at Chinateatern; 1965)
- School for Wives/The Criticism of the School for Wives (Royal Dramatic Theatre; 1966)
- The Investigation (Royal Dramatic Theatre; 1966; later adapted for radio)
- Six Characters in Search of an Author (Nationaltheatret; 1967)
- Woyzeck (Royal Dramatic Theatre; 1969)
- Hedda Gabler (Royal National Theatre/Cambridge Theatre; 1970)
- The Dream Play (Royal Dramatic Theatre; 1970)
- Show (Royal Dramatic Theatre; 1971)
- The Wild Duck (Royal Dramatic Theatre; 1972)
- The Misanthrope (Royal Danish Theatre; 1973)
- The Ghost Sonata (Royal Dramatic Theatre; 1973)
- To Damascus (Royal Dramatic Theatre; 1974)
- Twelfth Night, or What You Will (Royal Dramatic Theatre; 1975)
- A Dream Play (Residenztheater München; 1977)
- Three Sisters (Residenztheater München; 1978)
- Hedda Gabler (Residenztheater München; 1979)
- Tartuffe (Residenztheater München; 1979)
- Yvonne, Princess of Burgundy (Residenztheater München; 1980)
- Nora/Julie/Scenes from a Marriage (Residenztheater/Marstall; 1981)
- Dom Juan (Landestheater Salzburg/Cuvilliéstheater München; 1983)
- The Dance of the Rainsnakes (Residenztheater München; 1984)
- King Lear (Royal Dramatic Theatre; 1984)
- Miss Julie (Royal Dramatic Theatre; 1985)
- John Gabriel Borkman (Residenztheater München; 1985)
- Hamlet (Royal Dramatic Theatre; 1986)
- A Dream Play (Royal Dramatic Theatre; 1986)
- Long Day's Journey into Night (Royal Dramatic Theatre; 1988)
- A Doll's House (Royal Dramatic Theatre; 1989)
- Madame de Sade (Royal Dramatic Theatre; 1989)
- Peer Gynt (Royal Dramatic Theatre; 1991)
- The Bacchae (Royal Swedish Opera/SVT/CD; 1991)
- Miss Julie (BAM; 1991)
- The Time and the Room (Royal Dramatic Theatre; 1993)
- The Last Gasp (SFI/Royal Dramatic Theatre; 1993)
- The Winter's Tale (Royal Dramatic Theatre; 1994)
- Goldberg Variations (Royal Dramatic Theatre; 1994)
- Yvonne, Princess of Burgundy (Royal Dramatic Theatre; 1995)
- The Misanthrope (Royal Dramatic Theatre; 1995)
- The Bacchae (Royal Dramatic Theatre; 1996)
- Harald & Harald (Royal Dramatic Theatre; 1996)
- The Imagemakers (Royal Dramatic Theatre; 1998)
- Mary Stuart (Royal Dramatic Theatre; 2000)
- The Ghost Sonata (Royal Dramatic Theatre; 2000)
- Ghosts (Royal Dramatic Theatre; 2002)

== Radio productions ==
- Rabies (radio theatre; 1945; adapted from the Helsingborg City Theatre Production)
- Summer (radio theatre; 1946)
- Requiem (radio theatre; 1946; adapted from the Helsingborg City Theatre Production)
- Playing with Fire (radio theatre; 1947)
- The Waves (radio theatre; 1947)
- The Dutchman (radio theatre; 1947)
- Lodolezzi Sings (radio theatre; 1948)
- Come Up Empty (radio theatre; 1949)
- The People of Värmland (radio theatre; 1951)
- Summer (radio theatre; 1951)
- The City (radio theatre; 1951)
- The Restless Heart (radio theatre; 1952)
- The Day Ends Early (radio theatre; 1952)
- Easter (radio theatre; 1952)
- Blood Wedding (radio theatre; 1952)
- Crimes and Crimes (radio theatre; 1952)
- The Guiltburden of the Night (radio theatre; 1952)
- The Dutchman (radio theatre; 1953)
- A Caprice (radio theatre; 1953)
- Unto My Fear (radio theatre; 1953)
- The Apple-Tree Table (radio theatre; 1954)
- Wood Painting (radio theatre; 1954)
- The Ball (radio theatre; 1955)
- Portrait of a Madonna (radio theatre; 1956)
- The Tunnel (radio theatre; 1956)
- Everyman (radio theatre; 1956)
- Vox humana (radio theatre; 1956)
- Grandma and Our Lord (radio theatre; 1956)
- Counterfeiters (radio theatre; 1957)
- The Prisoner (radio theatre; 1957)
- He Who Nothing Owns (radio theatre; 1958)
- The Legend (radio theatre; 1958; adapted from the Malmö City Theatre production)
- First Warning (radio theatre; 1960)
- Playing with Fire (radio theatre; 1961)
- The Investigation (radio theatre; 1966; adapted from the Royal Dramatic Theatre production)
- A Hearsay (radio theatre; 1984)
- A Spiritual Matter (radio theatre; 1990)
- Storm Weather (radio theatre; 1999)
- John Gabriel Borkman (radio theatre; 2001)
- The Pelican / Death Island (radio theatre; 2003)
- Rosmersholm (radio theatre; 2004)

== Sources ==
- "Ingmar Bergman Theatre and radio". Ingmar Bergman Face to Face. Ingmar Bergman Foundation. Archived from the original on 6 July 2011.
- "Ingmar Bergman: Films". Swedish Film Database. Swedish Film Institute.

== See also ==
- Ingmar Bergman filmography
