= Ingmar Bergman filmography =

Filmography

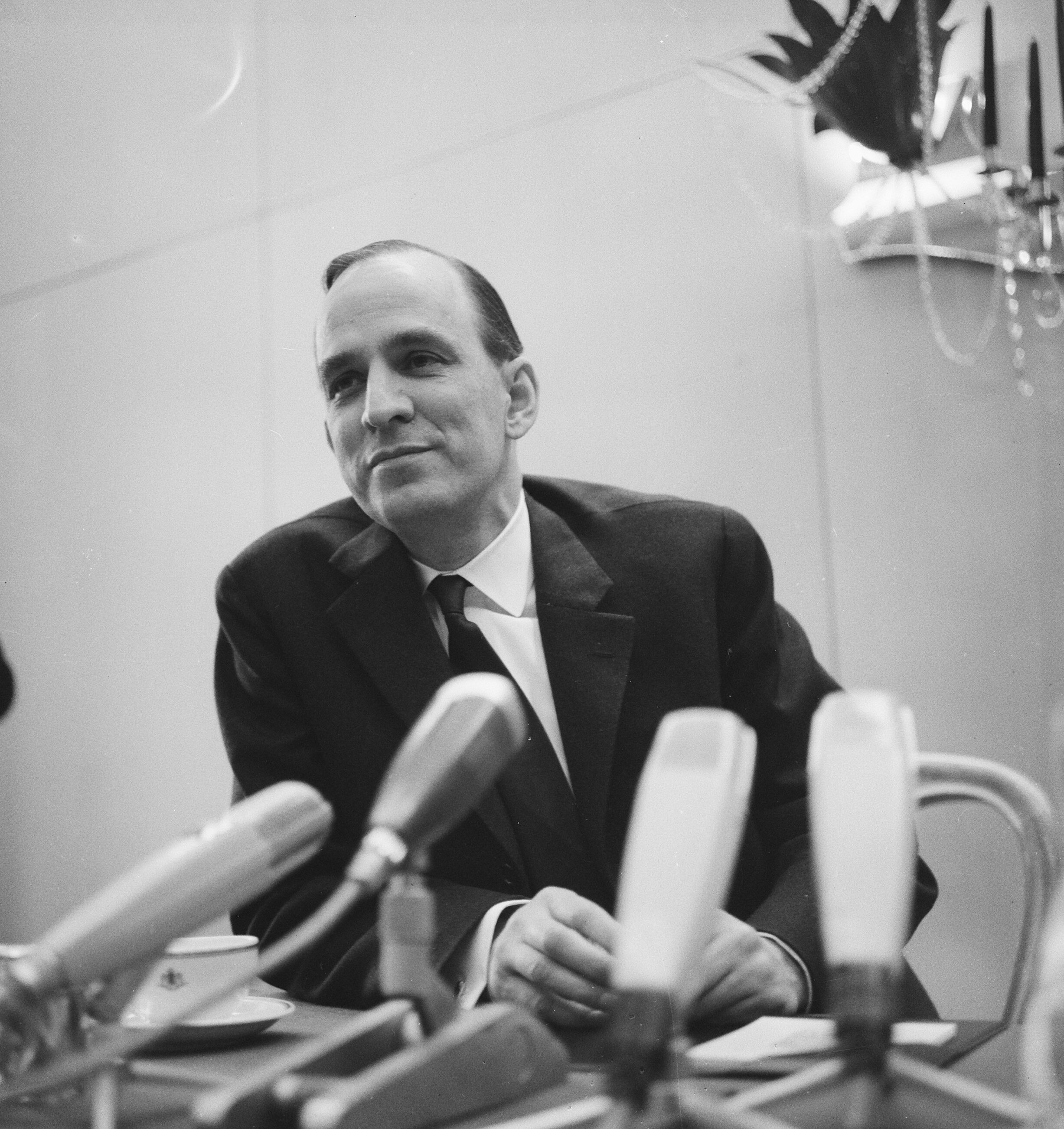
Bergman in 1966

Ingmar Bergman was a Swedish screenwriter and film director. Between 1944 and 2003 he directed 48 feature-length films, being 44 narrative films and 4 documentaries, as well as many short films. He also served as writer and producer for many other films.

In addition to his work in film, Bergman was playwright and theatre director, and he simultaneously worked extensively in theatre throughout his film career.

== Films as director ==
=== Narrative ===
Year	English title	Original title	Functioned as		Premiere		Notes
Year	English title	Original title	Director	Writer	Premiere		Notes
1946	Crisis	Kris	Yes	Yes	Theatrical	25 February	Based on the play Moderhjertet by Leck Fischer
1946	It Rains on Our Love	Det regnar på vår kärlek	Yes	Yes	Theatrical	9 November	Based on the play Bra mennesker by Oskar Braaten
1947	A Ship Bound for India	Skepp till Indialand	Yes	Yes	Theatrical	22 September	Based on the play Skepp till Indialand by Martin Söderhjelm
1948	Music in Darkness / Night Is My Future	Musik i mörker	Yes	Yes	Theatrical	17 January	Written by Bergman and Dagmar Edqvist, based on Edqvist's novel
1948	Port of Call	Hamnstad	Yes	Yes	Theatrical	11 October	Based on the story "Guldet och murarna" by Olle Länsberg
1949	Prison / The Devil's Wanton	Fängelse	Yes	Yes	Theatrical	19 March	
1949	Thirst / Three Strange Loves	Törst	Yes	No	Theatrical	17 October	Written by Herbert Grevenius, based on the story collection Törst by Birgit Tengroth
1950	To Joy	Till glädje	Yes	Yes	Theatrical	20 February	
1950	This Can't Happen Here	Sånt händer inte här	Yes	No	Theatrical	23 October	Written by Herbert Grevenius, based on the novel I løpet av tolv timer by Peter Valentin
1951	Summer Interlude / Illicit Interlude	Sommarlek	Yes	Yes	Theatrical	1 October	Based on the story "Mari" by Ingmar Bergman
1952	Secrets of Women / Waiting Women	Kvinnors väntan	Yes	Yes	Theatrical	3 November	
1953	Summer with Monika	Sommaren med Monika	Yes	Yes	Theatrical	9 February	Based on the novel Sommaren med Monika by Per Anders Fogelström
1953	Sawdust and Tinsel	Gycklarnas afton	Yes	Yes	Theatrical	14 September	
1954	A Lesson in Love	En lektion i kärlek	Yes	Yes	Theatrical	4 October	
1955	Dreams	Kvinnodröm	Yes	Yes	Theatrical	22 August	
1955	Smiles of a Summer Night	Sommarnattens leende	Yes	Yes	Theatrical	26 December	
1957	The Seventh Seal	Det sjunde inseglet	Yes	Yes	Theatrical	16 February	Based on the play Trämålning by Ingmar Bergman
1957	Wild Strawberries	Smultronstället	Yes	Yes	Theatrical	26 December	
1958	Brink of Life / So Close to Life	Nära livet	Yes	No	Theatrical	31 March	Written by Ulla Isaksson, based on her stories "Det vänliga, värdiga" and "Det orubbliga"
1958	The Magician	Ansiktet	Yes	Yes	Theatrical	26 December	
1960	The Virgin Spring	Jungfrukällan	Yes	No	Theatrical	31 March	Written by Ulla Isaksson, based on the ballad "Töres dotter i Wänge"
1960	The Devil's Eye	Djävulens öga	Yes	Yes	Theatrical	17 October	Based on the radio play Don Juan vender tilbage by Oluf Bang
1961	Through a Glass Darkly	Såsom i en spegel	Yes	Yes	Theatrical	16 October	
1963	Winter Light	Nattvardsgästerna	Yes	Yes	Theatrical	11 February	
1963	The Silence	Tystnaden	Yes	Yes	Theatrical	23 September	
1964	All These Women	För att inte tala om alla dessa kvinnor	Yes	Yes	Theatrical	15 June	Also known as Now About These Women
1966	Persona	Persona	Yes	Yes	Theatrical	18 October	
1967	Stimulantia	Stimulantia	Yes	Yes	Theatrical	28 March	Segment "Daniel"
1968	Hour of the Wolf	Vargtimmen	Yes	Yes	Theatrical	19 February	
1968	Shame	Skammen	Yes	Yes	Theatrical	29 September	
1969	The Rite	Riten	Yes	Yes	Television	25 March	Received a limited theatrical release outside Scandinavia
1969	The Passion of Anna	En passion	Yes	Yes	Theatrical	19 November	
1971	The Touch	Beröringen	Yes	Yes	Festival	6 June	
1972	Cries and Whispers	Viskningar och rop	Yes	Yes	Theatrical	21 December	
1973	Scenes from a Marriage	Scener ur ett äktenskap	Yes	Yes	Television	11 April	Later released in a shorter theatrical version
1975	The Magic Flute	Trollflöjten	Yes	Yes	Television	1 January	Based on The Magic Flute by Wolfgang Amadeus Mozart and Emanuel Schikaneder, also released theatrically
1976	Face to Face	Ansikte mot ansikte	Yes	Yes	Theatrical	5 April	Also released in a longer television version
1977	The Serpent's Egg	The Serpent's Egg / Ormens ägg / Das Schlangenei	Yes	Yes	Theatrical	28 October	
1978	Autumn Sonata	Höstsonaten	Yes	Yes	Theatrical	8 October	
1980	From the Life of the Marionettes	Aus dem Leben der Marionetten	Yes	Yes	Television	8 October	
1982	Fanny and Alexander	Fanny och Alexander	Yes	Yes	Theatrical	17 December	Also released in a longer television version
1984	After the Rehearsal	Efter repetitionen	Yes	Yes	Television	9 April	Based on the play Efter repetitionen by Ingmar Bergman; Received theatrical release internationally
1986	The Blessed Ones	De två saliga	Yes	No	Television	19 February	Written by Ulla Isaksson, based on her novel
1997	In the Presence of a Clown	Larmar och gör sig till	Yes	Yes	Television	1 November	Based on the play Larmar och gör sig till by Ingmar Bergman
2000	The Image Makers	Bildmakarna	Yes	No	Television	15 November	Written by Per Olov Enquist
2003	Saraband	Saraband	Yes	Yes	Television	1 December	Received theatrical release internationally

=== Documentary ===
Year	English title	Original title	Notes
1953		"Bakomfilm Gycklarnas afton"	Short film
1954		"Bakomfilm Kvinnodröm"	Short film
1954		"Bakomfilm En lektion i kärlek"	Short film
1955		"Bakomfilm Sommarnattens leende"	Short film
1956		"Bakomfilm Det sjunde inseglet"	Short film
1957		"Bakomfilm Smultronstället"	Short film
1957		"Bakomfilm Nära livet"	Short film
1958		"Bakomfilm Ansiktet"	Short film
1961		"Bakomfilm Såsom i en spegel"	Short film
1961		"Bakomfilm Nattvardsgästerna"	Short film
1967		"Bakomfilm Vargtimmen"	Short film
1970	Fårö Document	Fårödokument	
1972		"Bakomfilm Viskningar och rop"	Short film
1973		"Bakomfilm Scener ur ett äktenskap"	Short film
1976		"Bakomfilm Ansikte mot ansikte"	Short film
1976	"The Dance of the Damned Women"	"De fördömda kvinnornas dans"	Short film
1978	The Making of Autumn Sonata	Bakomfilm Höstsonaten	
1979	Fårö Document 1979	Fårödokument 1979	
1980		"Bakomfilm Aus dem Leben der Marionetten"	Short film
1984		"Bakomfilm Efter repetitionen"	Short film
1984	The Making of Fanny and Alexander	Dokument Fanny och Alexander	
1986	"Karin's Face"	"Karins ansikte"	Short film

== Other film work ==
=== Narrative ===
Year	English title	Original title	Functioned as		Premiere		Notes
Year	English title	Original title	Writer	Producer	Premiere		Notes
1944	Torment	Hets	Yes	No	Theatrical	2 October	Directed by Alf Sjöberg
1947	Woman Without a Face	Kvinna utan ansikte	Yes	No	Theatrical	16 September	Directed by Gustaf Molander
1948	Eva	Eva	Yes	No	Theatrical	26 December	Directed by Gustaf Molander
1950	While the City Sleeps	Medan staden sover	No	No	Theatrical	8 September	Provided some input Directed by Lars-Eric Kjellgren, based on the novel Ligister by Per Anders Fogelström
1951	Divorced	Frånskild	Yes	No	Theatrical	26 December	Directed by Gustaf Molander
1956	Last Pair Out	Sista paret ut	Yes	No	Theatrical	12 November	Directed by Alf Sjöberg
1961	The Pleasure Garden	Lustgården	Yes	No	Theatrical	26 December	Directed by Alf Kjellin
1970	The Lie / The Sanctuary	Reservatet: en banalitetens tragi-komedi	Yes	No	Television	28 October	Directed by Jan Molander
1977	Summer Paradise	Paradistorg	No	Yes	Theatrical	2 February	Producer, directed by Gunnel Lindblom
1981	Sally and Freedom	Sally och friheten	No	Yes	Theatrical	28 February	Producer, directed by Gunnel Lindblom
1991	The Best Intentions	Den goda viljan	Yes	No	Television	25 December	Directed by Bille August, also released in a shorter theatrical version
1992	Sunday's Children	Söndagsbarn	Yes	No	Theatrical	28 August	Directed by Daniel Bergman
1996	Private Confessions	Enskilda samtal	Yes	No	Television	12 December	Directed by Liv Ullmann, based on the book Enskilda samtal by Ingmar Bergman, also released in a shorter festival version
2000	Faithless	Trolösa	Yes	No	Festival	13 May	Directed by Liv Ullmann

=== Documentary ===
Year	English title	Original title	Notes
1979	My Beloved	Min älskade	Produced by Ingmar Bergman, directed and written by Kjell Grede
1987	Gotska sandön	Gotska sandön	Produced by Ingmar Bergman and Lisbet Gabrielsson, directed by Arne Carlsson

== See also ==
- List of stage productions directed by Ingmar Bergman

== Bibliography ==
- "Ingmar Bergman: Films". Swedish Film Database. Swedish Film Institute.
- "Ingmar Bergman Theatre and radio". Ingmar Bergman Face to Face. Ingmar Bergman Foundation. Archived from the original on 6 July 2011.
