= Serner =

Serner is a surname. Notable people with the surname include:

- Anna Serner (born 1964), Swedish legal professional
- Håkan Serner (1933–1984), Swedish actor
- Walter Serner (1889–1942), German-language writer and essayist
