= Gun Bergman =

Swedish translator, linguist, journalist

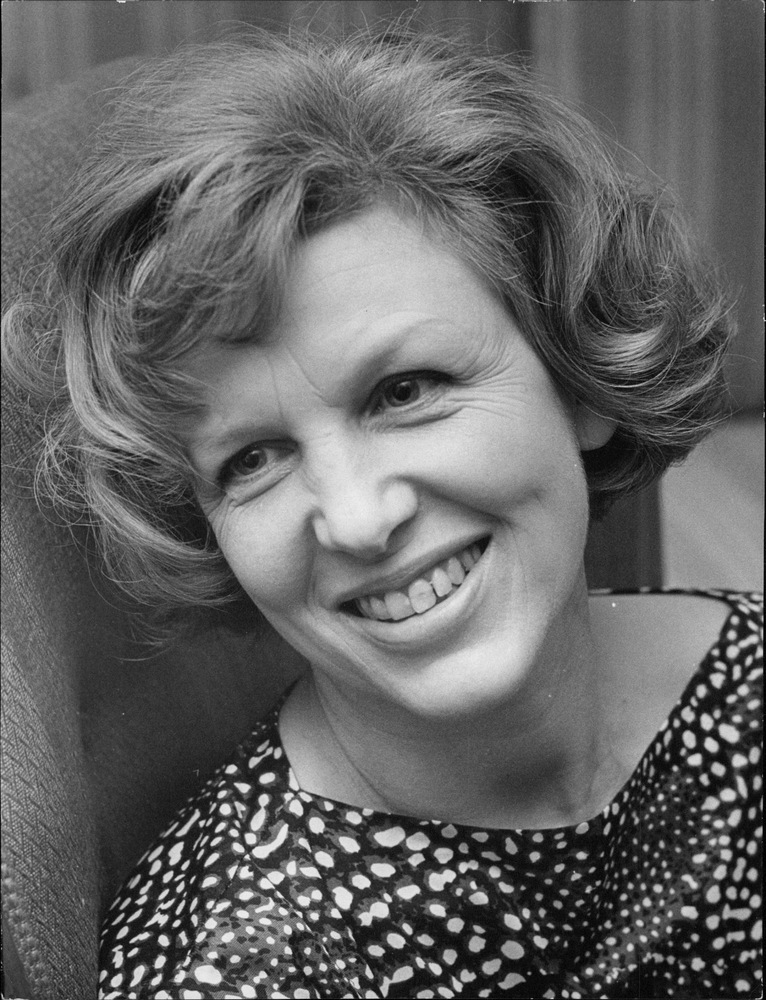
- Gun Bergman in 1964
- Born: Gunvor Marianne Hagberg; 28 October 1916; Linköping, Sweden
- Died: 1 July 1971 (aged 54); Yugoslavia
- Education: Uppsala University
- Occupations: Translator; linguist; journalist
- Spouses: Hugo Grut (m. 1941; div. 1950); Ingmar Bergman (m. 1951; div. 1959)
- Awards: Svenska Akademiens översättarpris

Gun Bergman (28 October 1916 – 1 July 1971) was a Swedish translator, linguist, and journalist. Known for her translations from Slavic languages to Swedish, her greatest feat was her translation of Ivo Andrić's novel The Bridge on the Drina in 1960. She was married to Swedish film director Ingmar Bergman from 1951 to 1959.

== Life ==
Gun Bergman was born Gunvor Marianne Hagberg in Linköping, Sweden, on 28 October 1916. She was the daughter of Robert Hagberg, a restaurateur, and his wife Ebba (née Westerberg). After graduating from the Linkoping High School, she moved to Stockholm, where she worked for the Bonnier publishing house, and also worked as a dancer at private theatres. In 1941, Bergman married Hugo Grut, an engineer. They had two sons.

During the 1940s, Bergman began working as a journalist for the Scandinavian newspaper Expressen. In August 1949, she met the film director Ingmar Bergman, and they traveled to Paris in September of the same year. Gun and Hugo Grut divorced in 1950, and she married Ingmar Bergman in 1951. The same year their son Ingmar Bergman Jr. was born. According to Ingmar Bergman's autobiography Laterna magica, Gun Bergman served as a model for many female characters of his films. Examples include: Karen Lobelius in Secrets of Women (1952), Marijana Egerman in A Lesson in Love (1954), and Desiree Armfeldt in Smiles of a Summer Night (1955). The couple divorced in 1959.

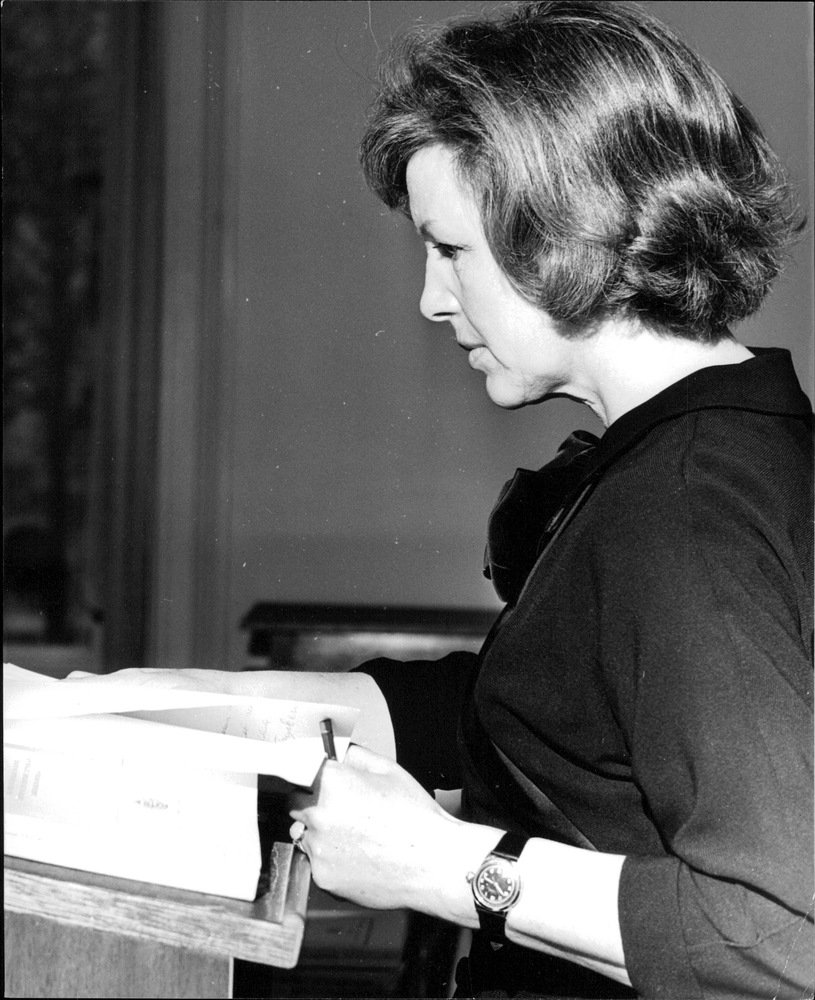
Gun Bergman in 1964.

In the early 1950s, Bergman studied Slavic languages and began working towards a PhD at the Uppsala University. During this time, she taught Serbo-Croatian, Old Church Slavonic and Russian languages at several academic institutions in Uppsala and Stockholm. She simultaneously began her career as a translator, producing translations of Russian and Yugoslav plays for the Swedish Radio. Among her translated works were Leo Tolstoy's comedy The Origin of Everything as well as several novels of Yugoslavic writer Ivo Andrić.

Bergman's breakthrough work is her translation of Andrić's historical novel The Bridge on the Drina. Published by Bonnier AB in 1960, it became her first major published work and she achieved her greatest fame with it. The following year, Andrić was awarded the Nobel Prize in Literature. He later thanked Bergman in a letter for her nuanced translations of his works, which he felt contributed to the success of his books in Sweden. He wrote, "[...] there is only one publisher in Sweden, and that is Bonniers, and only one translator, and that is you". Following the success of The Bridge on the Drina in Sweden, Bergman was awarded the Svenska Akademiens översättarpris (Swedish Academy's Translator's Prize) in 1962. In 1964, she earned her PhD with a dissertation on Russian manuscripts.

In the latter part of her life, Bergman translated poetry by South Slav and French-language African poets. Among these were Léopold Sédar Senghor's Elegier (1969), Elisaveta Bagryana's Livet jag ville göra till dikt (1970), Vasko Popa's Den ena benknotan till den andra (1972), and Aimé Césaire's De underbara vapnen (1975).

Bergman died in a car accident at the age of 54, on 1 July 1971.
