= Else Fisher =

Swedish choreographer (1918–2006)

- Born: Else Marie Fisher; 1 March 1918; Melbourne, Victoria, Australia
- Died: 3 March 2006 (aged 88)
- Other name: Else Fisher-Bergman
- Occupations: choreographer, dancer, theater director, writer
- Spouse: Ingmar Bergman (m. 1943; div. 1945)
- Children: Lena Bergman

Else Marie Fisher-Bergman (1 March 1918 – 3 March 2006) was a Swedish choreographer, dancer, theatre director, and writer.

== Career ==
Fisher wrote several children's books and theatre plays (including Beppo the Clown (Clownen Beppo), a dance pantomime directed by Ingmar Bergman, while working as a choreographer and director at various theaters in Sweden.

== Personal life ==
Fisher was born 1 March 1918 in Melbourne, Australia. From 1943 to 1945, she was married to Swedish director Ingmar Bergman, with whom she had a daughter, Lena Bergman, before their divorce. She died 3 March 2006.

== Filmography ==
=== Actor ===
- 1948 – Stanna en stund!
- 1950 – Två trappor över gården
- 1952 – Bom the Flyer
- 1956 – Rasmus, Pontus och Toker

=== Choreography ===
- 1956 – Det renaste ni drömt om...
- 1957 – The Seventh Seal (Det sjunde inseglet)
