= Arkivet för orealiserbara drömmar och visioner =

2012 play by Marcus Lindeen

- Original language: Swedish
- Written by: Marcus Lindeen
- Based on: abandoned ideas by Ingmar Bergman

Premiere
- Date: 27 May 2012
- Place: Stockholm City Theatre
- Directed by: Marcus Lindeen

Arkivet för orealiserbara drömmar och visioner (lit. 'The Archive for Unrealisable Dreams and Visions') is a 2012 play by the Swedish writer Marcus Lindeen. It is based on a series of discarded ideas found in Ingmar Bergman's private archive.

== Plot ==
The play consists of unconnected scenes taken from discarded film ideas, story drafts and screenplays by Ingmar Bergman, found in a private archive Bergman referred to as "the shit" (Swedish: skiten). Marcus Lindeen spent a year looking through the archive. The abandoned projects he took parts of and incorporated in the play include an erotic comedy film from the 1970s, a play about cannibals, an opera libretto and scenes set inside a womb.

== Production history ==
The play premiered at the Stockholm City Theatre on 27 May 2012, directed by Lindeen and starring an ensemble of six actors. The playtime was 1 hour and 25 minutes. Jonas Holmberg of Expressen praised the first half of the play, writing that he could not stop laughing, whereas the second half, although more complex and visual, is weaker.

== See also ==
- List of abandoned and unfinished films
