= Ingmar Bergman =

Swedish filmmaker (1918–2007)

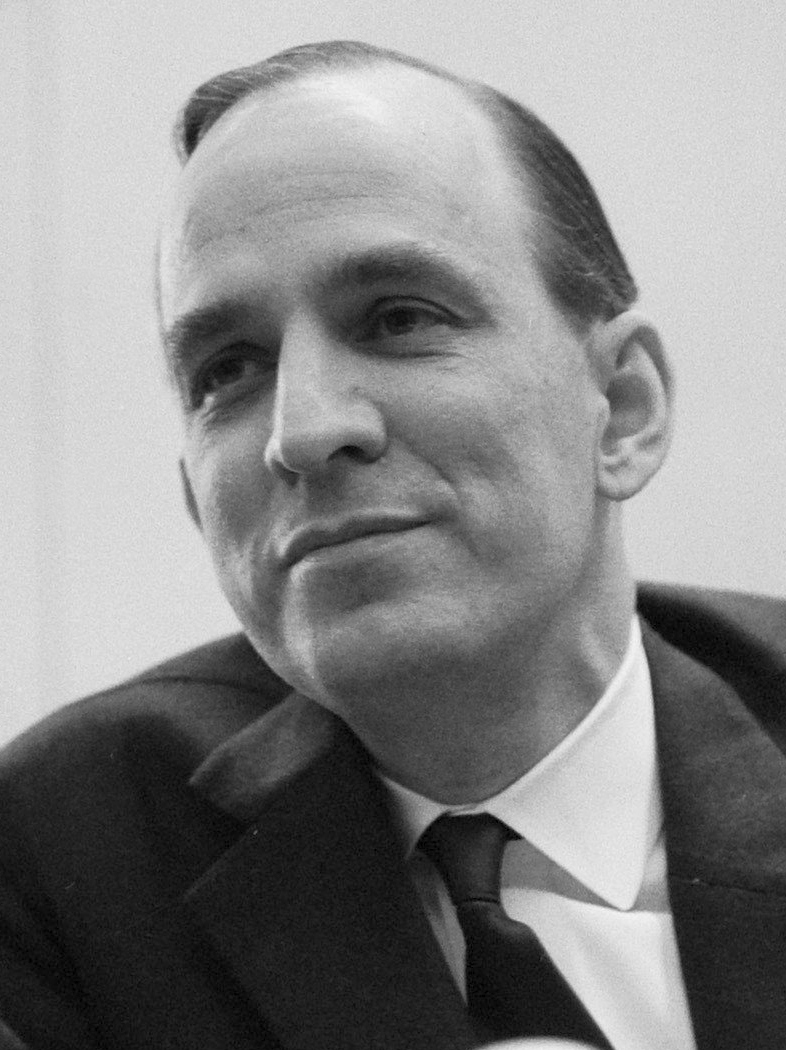
- Bergman in 1966
- Born: Ernst Ingmar Bergman; 14 July 1918; Uppsala, Sweden
- Died: 30 July 2007 (aged 89); Fårö, Sweden
- Occupations: Director; screenwriter
- Years active: 1944–2005
- Works: Full list
- Spouses: Else Fisher (m. 1943; div. 1945); Ellen Lundström (m. 1945; div. 1950); Gun Grut (m. 1951; div. 1959); Käbi Laretei (m. 1959; div. 1969); Ingrid von Rosen (m. 1971; died 1995)
- Children: 9, including Linn, Eva, Mats, Anna and Daniel
- Father: Erik Bergman
- Awards: Full list

Signature
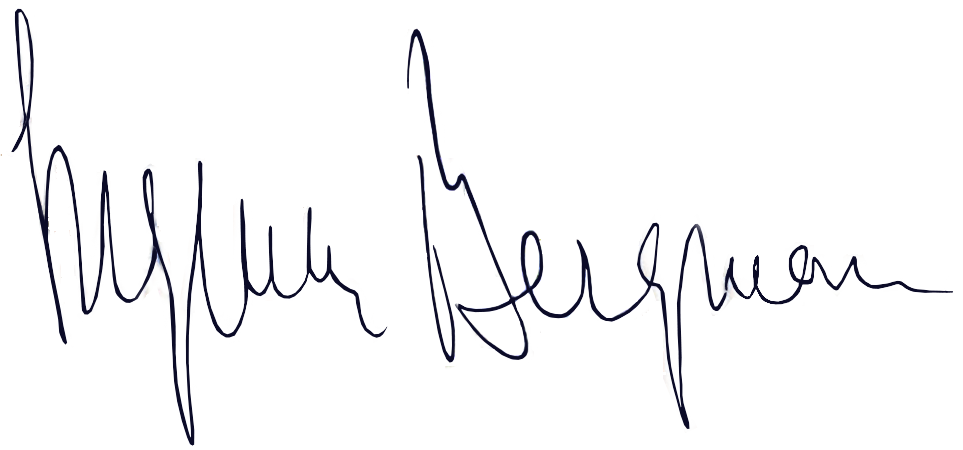

Ernst Ingmar Bergman (Note: Swedish: [ˈɪ̌ŋːmar ˈbæ̌rjman]) (14 July 1918 – 30 July 2007) was a Swedish filmmaker and theatre director. He is considered one of the greatest and most important filmmakers in the history of cinema, most notably as a prominent figure of both European film industry and Swedish cinema. His films have been described as "profoundly personal meditations into the myriad struggles facing the psyche and the soul."

Among his most acclaimed works are The Seventh Seal (1957), Wild Strawberries (1957), Persona (1966) and Fanny and Alexander (1982), which were included in the 2012 edition of Sight & Sound's Greatest Films of All Time. He was also ranked No. 8 on the magazine's 2002 "Greatest Directors of All Time" list. Other notable works include Sawdust and Tinsel (1953), A Lesson in Love (1954), Smiles of a Summer Night (1955), The Virgin Spring (1960), Through a Glass Darkly (1961), Winter Light and The Silence (both 1963), Shame (1968) which was called the director's ultimate personal vision of war, Cries and Whispers (1972), Scenes from a Marriage (1973) and Autumn Sonata (1978). His films led to international acclaim and garnered Academy Award wins and nominations throughout his career, including his personal Irving G. Thalberg Memorial Award and three competitive wins accepted for Best Foreign Language Film to Swedish entries.

Bergman directed more than 60 films and documentaries, most of which he also wrote, for both cinema releases and television screenings. Most of his films were set in Sweden, and many of his films from 1961 onward were filmed on the island of Fårö. He forged a creative partnership with his cinematographers Gunnar Fischer and Sven Nykvist. Bergman also had a theatrical career that included periods as Leading Director of Sweden's Royal Dramatic Theatre in Stockholm and of Germany's Residenztheater in Munich. He directed more than 170 plays. Among his company of actors were Harriet Andersson, Bibi Andersson, Liv Ullmann, Gunnar Björnstrand, Erland Josephson, Ingrid Thulin, Gunnel Lindblom and Max von Sydow.

== Biography ==
=== Early life ===
Ernst Ingmar Bergman was born in Uppsala on 14 July 1918, the son of nurse Karin (née Åkerblom) and Lutheran minister (and later chaplain to the King of Sweden) Erik Bergman. His mother was of Walloon descent. (Note: In a book published in 2011, Bergman's niece Veronica Ralston suggested that the director was not identical to the child born to Erik and Karin Bergman in July 1918. Ralston's claim was that this child would have died and been substituted for another child allegedly born to Erik Bergman in an extramarital relationship. The DNA evidence was weakened after the laboratory consulted by Ralston clarified that it had only been possible to extract DNA from one out of two stamps submitted for testing, and the child supposedly substituted for the newborn child of Karin Bergman was later identified as having emigrated to the US in 1923 with his adopted parents and lived there until his death in 1982.) The Bergman family was originally from Järvsö. On his father's side, Bergman was a descendant of the noble Bröms, Ehrenskiöld, and Stockenström clergy families of Finnish, German, and Swedish origin. His father also descended from the German noble families Flach and de Frese introduced at the Swedish Riddarhuset. Bergman's paternal grandmother and maternal grandfather were cousins, making his parents second cousins. On his mother's side, he was descended from Dutch merchant Paul Calwagen, who left Holland for Sweden in the 17th century; Paul's Dutch-Swedish wife, Maria van der Hagen, was a descendant of the court painter Laurens van der Plas. Bergman's mother was also a descendant of the noble Tigerschiöld and Weinholz families, as well as the Bure family.

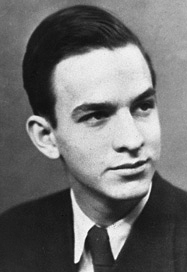
Bergman as a young man

Bergman grew up with his older brother Dag and younger sister Margareta surrounded by religious imagery and discussion. His father was a conservative parish minister with strict ideas of parenting. Ingmar was locked up in dark closets for infractions such as wetting himself. "While father preached away in the pulpit and the congregation prayed, sang, or listened", Ingmar wrote in his autobiography Laterna Magica, "I devoted my interest to the church's mysterious world of low arches, thick walls, the smell of eternity, the coloured sunlight quivering above the strangest vegetation of medieval paintings and carved figures on ceilings and walls. There was everything that one's imagination could desire—angels, saints, dragons, prophets, devils, humans..." Although raised in a devout Lutheran household, Bergman later stated that he lost his faith at age eight, and came to terms with this fact while making Winter Light in 1962. His interest in theatre and film began early; at the age of nine, he traded a set of tin soldiers for a magic lantern. Within a year, he had created a private world by playing with this toy in which he felt completely at home. He fashioned his own scenery, marionettes, and lighting effects and gave puppet productions of Strindberg plays in which he spoke all the parts." (Note: For an extended discussion of the profound influence that August Strindberg's work played in Bergman's life and career, see: Ottiliana Rolandsson, Pure Artistry: Ingmar Bergman, the Face as Portal and the Performance of the Soul, Ph.D. dissertation, University of California, Santa Barbara, 2010, especially chapter 3, "Bergman, Strindberg and the Territories of Imagination".)

Bergman attended the Palmgren School as a teenager. His school years were unhappy, and he remembered them unfavourably in later years. In a 1944 letter concerning the film Torment (sometimes known as Frenzy), which sparked debate on the condition of Swedish high schools (and which Bergman had written), the school's principal Henning Håkanson wrote, among other things, that Bergman had been a "problem child". Bergman wrote in a response that he had strongly disliked the emphasis on homework and testing in his formal schooling.

In 1934, aged 16, he was sent to Germany to spend the summer holidays with family friends. He attended a Nazi rally in Weimar at which he saw Adolf Hitler. He later wrote in Laterna Magica (The Magic Lantern) about the visit to Germany, describing how the German family had put a portrait of Hitler on the wall by his bed, and that "for many years, I was on Hitler's side, delighted by his success and saddened by his defeats". Bergman commented that "Hitler was unbelievably charismatic. He electrified the crowd. ... The Nazism I had seen seemed fun and youthful." Bergman did two five-month stretches of mandatory military service in Sweden. He later reflected,

When the doors to the concentration camps were thrown open, at first I did not want to believe my eyes ... When the truth came out it was a hideous shock for me. In a brutal and violent way I was suddenly ripped of my innocence.

Bergman enrolled at Stockholm University College (later renamed Stockholm University) in 1937, to study art and literature. He spent most of his time involved in student theatre and became a "genuine movie addict". At the same time, a romantic involvement led to a physical confrontation with his father which resulted in a break in their relationship which lasted for many years. Although he did not graduate from the university, he wrote a number of plays and an opera, and became an assistant director at a local theatre. In 1942, he was given the opportunity to direct one of his own scripts, Caspar's Death. The play was seen by members of Svensk Filmindustri, which then offered Bergman a position working on scripts. He married Else Fisher in 1943.

=== Film career until 1975 ===
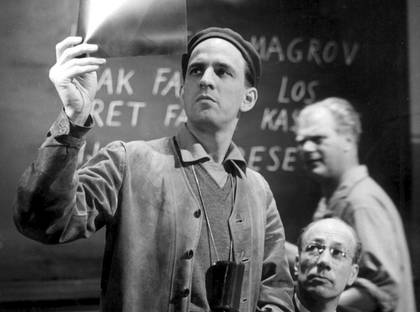
Bergman in 1957

Bergman's film career began in 1941 with his work rewriting scripts, but his first major accomplishment was in 1944 when he wrote the screenplay for Torment (a.k.a. Frenzy) (Hets), a film directed by Alf Sjöberg. Along with writing the screenplay, he was also appointed assistant director of the film. In his second autobiographical book, Images: My Life in Film, Bergman describes the filming of the exteriors as his actual film directorial debut. The film sparked debate on Swedish formal education. When Henning Håkanson (the principal of the high school Bergman had attended) wrote a letter following the film's release, Bergman, according to scholar Frank Gado, disparaged in a response what he viewed as Håkanson's implication that students "who did not fit some arbitrary prescription of worthiness deserved the system's cruel neglect". Bergman also stated in the letter that he "hated school as a principle, as a system and as an institution. And as such I have definitely not wanted to criticize my own school, but all schools." The international success of this film led to Bergman's first opportunity to direct a year later. During the next ten years he wrote and directed more than a dozen films, including Prison (Fängelse) in 1949, as well as Sawdust and Tinsel (Gycklarnas afton) and Summer with Monika (Sommaren med Monika), both released in 1953.

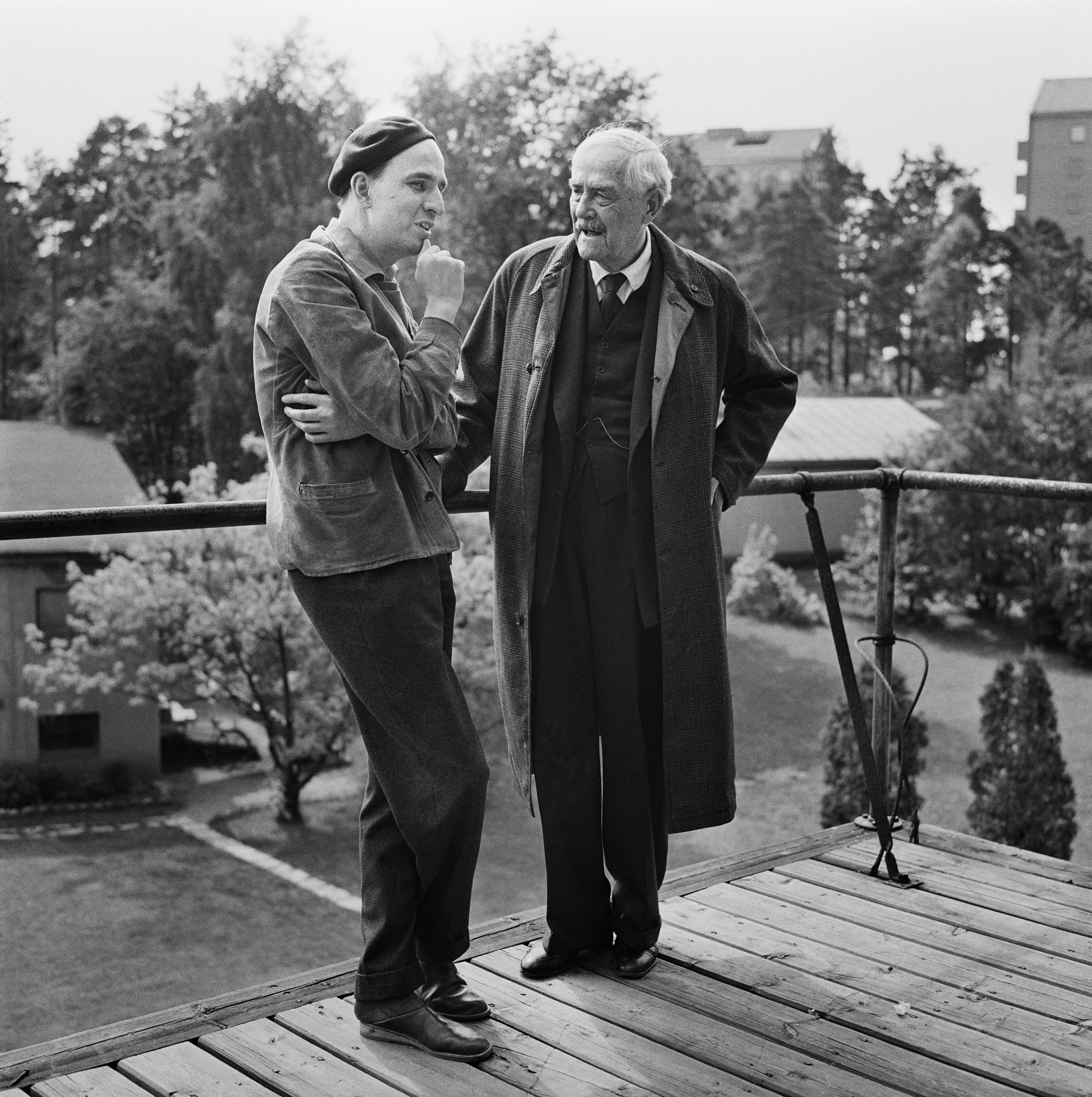
Bergman and Victor Sjöström on the set of Wild Strawberries (1957)

Bergman first achieved worldwide success with Smiles of a Summer Night (Sommarnattens leende, 1955), which won for "Best poetic humour" and was nominated for the Palme d'Or at Cannes the following year. This was followed by The Seventh Seal (Det sjunde inseglet) and Wild Strawberries (Smultronstället), released in Sweden ten months apart in 1957. The Seventh Seal won a special jury prize and was nominated for the Palme d'Or at Cannes, and Wild Strawberries won numerous awards for Bergman and its star, Victor Sjöström. Bergman continued to be productive for the next two decades. From the early 1960s, he spent much of his life on the island of Fårö, where he made several films.

In the early 1960s he directed three films that explored the theme of faith and doubt in God, Through a Glass Darkly (Såsom i en Spegel, 1961), Winter Light (Nattvardsgästerna, 1962), and The Silence (Tystnaden, 1963). Critics created the notion that the common themes in these three films made them a trilogy or cinematic triptych. Bergman initially responded that he did not plan these three films as a trilogy, and that he could not see any common motifs in them, but he later seemed to adopt the notion, with some equivocation. (Note: In contrast, in 1964 Bergman had the three scripts published in a single volume: "These three films deal with reduction. Through a Glass Darkly – conquered certainty. Winter Light – penetrated certainty. The Silence – God's silence — the negative imprint. Therefore, they constitute a trilogy." The Criterion Collection groups the films as a trilogy in a boxed set. In the 1963 documentary Ingmar Bergman Makes a Movie, about the making of Winter Light, supports the idea that Bergman did not plan a trilogy. In the interview with Bergman about writing the script of Winter Light, and the interviews made during the shooting of it, he hardly mentions Through a Glass Darkly. Instead, he discusses the themes of Winter Light, in particular the religious issues, in relation to The Virgin Spring.) His parody of the films of Federico Fellini, All These Women (För att inte tala om alla dessa kvinnor) was released in 1964.

Persona (1966), starring Bibi Andersson and Liv Ullmann, is a film Bergman considered one of his most important works. While the highly experimental film won few awards, it has been considered his masterpiece. Other films of the period include The Virgin Spring (Jungfrukällan, 1960), Hour of the Wolf (Vargtimmen, 1968), Shame (Skammen, 1968) and The Passion of Anna (En Passion, 1969). With his cinematographer Sven Nykvist, Bergman made use of a crimson color scheme for Cries and Whispers (1972), which received a nomination for the Academy Award for Best Picture. He also produced extensively for Swedish television at this time. Two works of note were Scenes from a Marriage (Scener ur ett äktenskap, 1973) and The Magic Flute (Trollflöjten, 1975).

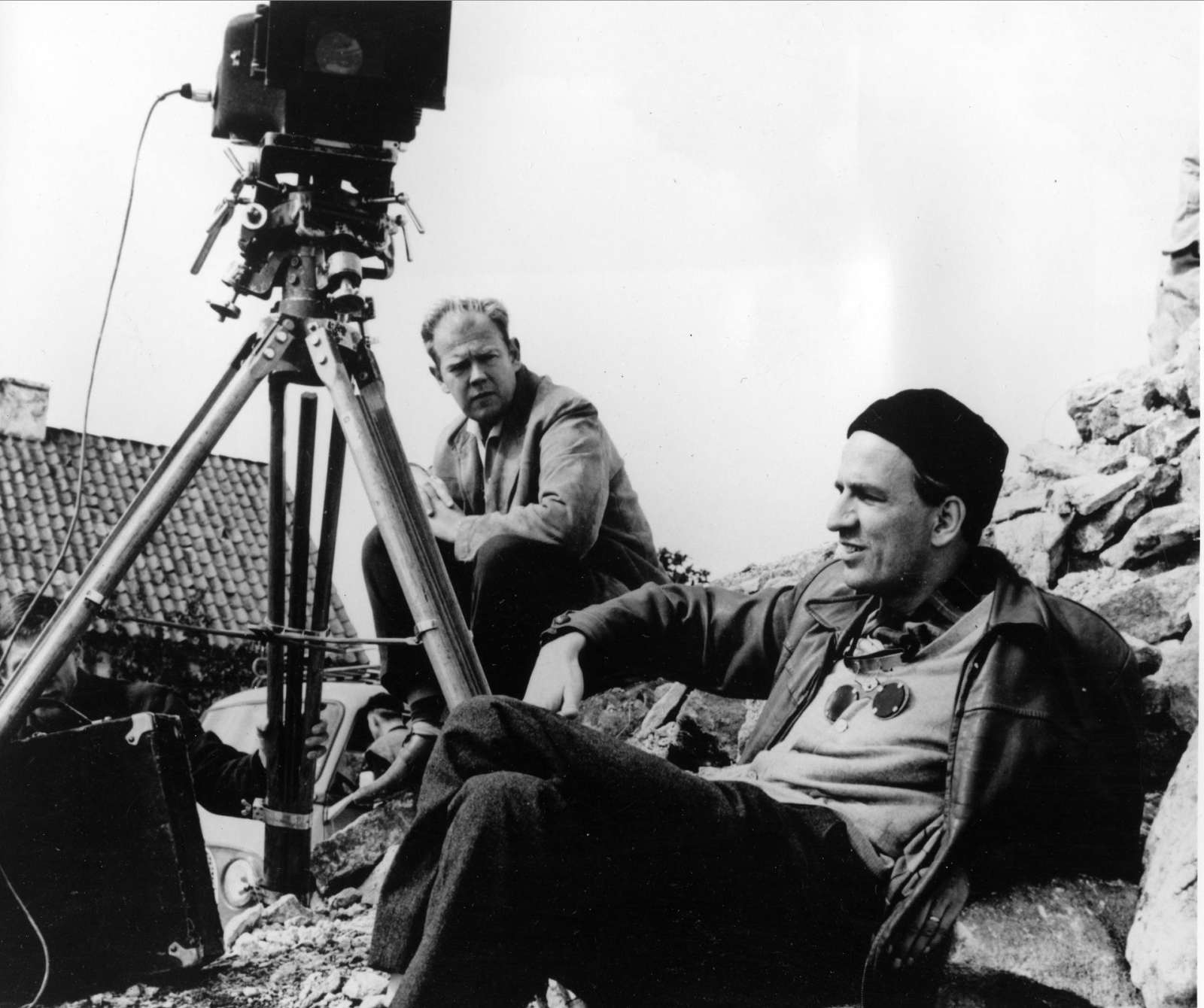
Bergman with his long-time cinematographer Sven Nykvist during the production of Through a Glass Darkly (1960)

=== Tax evasion charges in 1976 ===
On 30 January 1976, while rehearsing August Strindberg's The Dance of Death at the Royal Dramatic Theatre in Stockholm, he was arrested by two plainclothes police officers and charged with income tax evasion. The impact on Bergman was devastating. He suffered a nervous breakdown as a result of the humiliation, and was hospitalised in a state of deep depression.

The investigation focused on an alleged 1970 transaction of 500,000 Swedish kronor (SEK) between Bergman's Swedish company Cinematograf and its Swiss subsidiary Persona, an entity that was mainly used for the paying of salaries to foreign actors. Bergman dissolved Persona in 1974 after having been notified by the Swedish Central Bank and subsequently reported the income. On 23 March 1976, the special prosecutor Anders Nordenadler dropped the charges against Bergman, saying that the alleged crime had no legal basis, and added that it would be like bringing "charges against a person who has stolen his own car, thinking it was someone else's". Director General Gösta S Ekman, chief of the Swedish Internal Revenue Service, defended the failed investigation, saying that the investigation was dealing with important legal material, and that Bergman was treated just like any other suspect. He expressed regret that Bergman had left the country, hoping that Bergman was a "stronger" person now when the investigation had shown that he had not done any wrong.

Although the charges were dropped, Bergman became disconsolate, fearing he would never again return to directing. Despite pleas by the Swedish prime minister Olof Palme, high public figures, and leaders of the film industry, he vowed never to work in Sweden again. He closed down his studio on the island of Fårö, suspended two announced film projects, and went into self-imposed exile in Munich, West Germany. Harry Schein, director of the Swedish Film Institute, estimated the immediate damage as ten million SEK and hundreds of jobs lost.

=== Aftermath following arrest ===
Bergman then briefly considered the possibility of working in America. His next film, The Serpent's Egg (1977) was a West German-U.S. production and was his second English-language film (the first being The Touch, 1971). This was followed by a British-Norwegian co-production, Autumn Sonata (Höstsonaten, 1978) starring Ingrid Bergman (no relation) and Liv Ullmann, and From the Life of the Marionettes (Aus dem Leben der Marionetten, 1980) which was a British-West German co-production.

He temporarily returned to his homeland to direct Fanny and Alexander (Fanny och Alexander, 1982). Bergman stated that the film would be his last, and that afterwards he would focus on directing theatre. After that he wrote several film scripts and directed a number of television specials. As with previous work for television, some of these productions were later theatrically released. The last such work was Saraband (2003), a sequel to Scenes from a Marriage. It was directed by Bergman when he was 84 years old.

Although he continued to operate from Munich, by mid-1978 Bergman had overcome some of his bitterness toward the Swedish government. In July of that year he visited Sweden, celebrating his sixtieth birthday on the island of Fårö, and partly resumed his work as a director at Royal Dramatic Theatre. To honour his return, the Swedish Film Institute launched a new Ingmar Bergman Prize to be awarded annually for excellence in filmmaking. Still, he remained in Munich until 1984. In one of his last major interviews, conducted in 2005 on the island of Fårö, Bergman said that despite being active during the exile, he had effectively lost eight years of his professional life.

=== Retirement and death ===
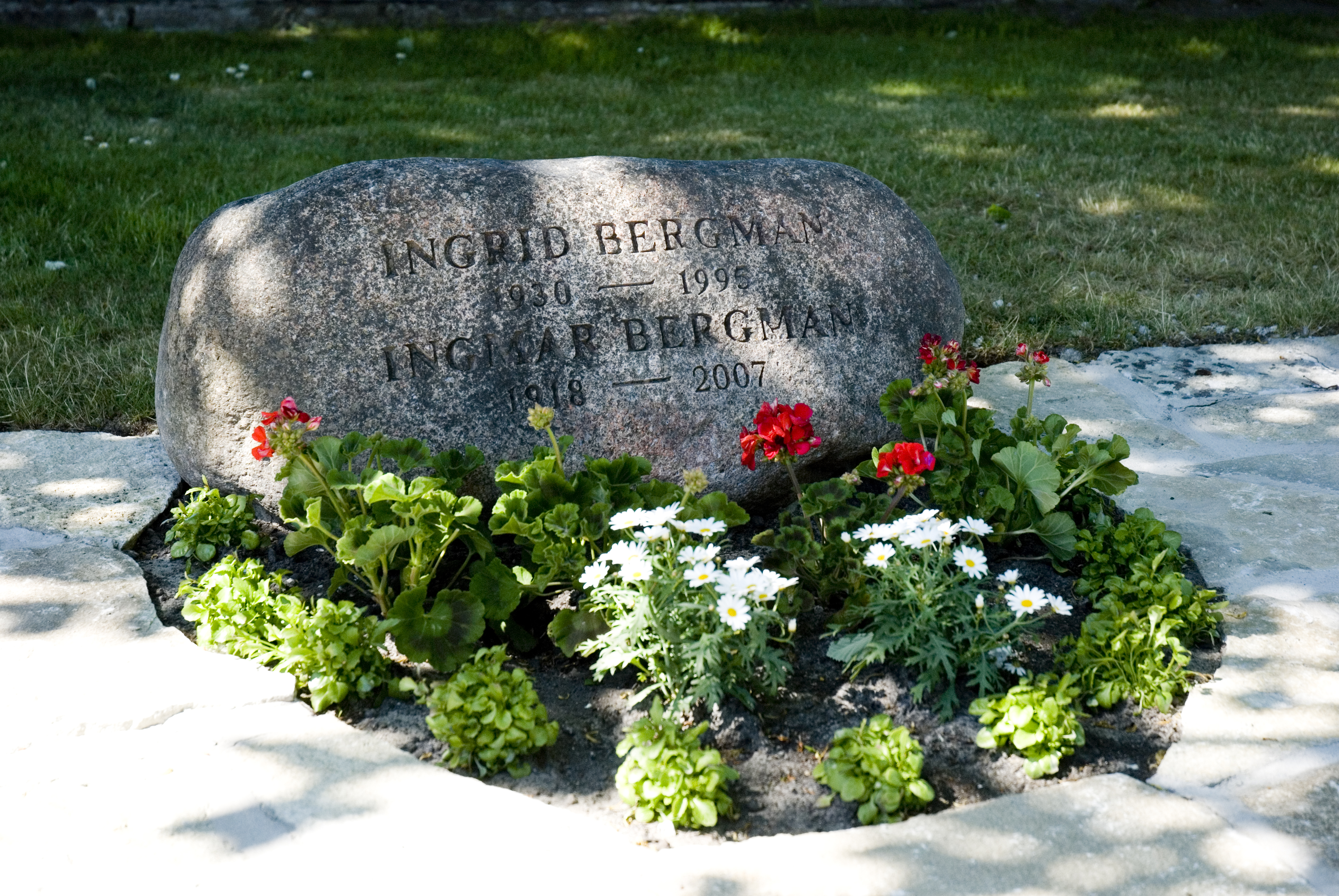
The grave of Bergman and his last wife Ingrid.

Bergman retired from filmmaking in December 2003. He had hip surgery in October 2006 and was making a difficult recovery. He died in his sleep at age 89; his body was found at his home on the island of Fårö, on 30 July 2007. It was the same day another renowned existentialist film director, Michelangelo Antonioni, died. The interment was private, at the Fårö Church on 18 August 2007. A place in the Fårö churchyard was prepared for him under heavy secrecy. Although he was buried on the island of Fårö, his name and date of birth were inscribed under his wife's name on a tomb at Roslagsbro churchyard, Norrtälje Municipality, several years before his death.

== Bibliography ==
- The Seventh Seal (1956) [screenplay]
- Wild Strawberries (1957) [screenplay]
- Four Screenplays: Smiles of a Summer Night, The Seventh Seal, Wild Strawberries, and The Magician (1969) [screenplays]
- Three Films: Through a Glass Darkly, Winter Light, and The Silence (1970) [screenplays]
- A Dream Play (1971) [adaptation of A Dream Play by August Strindberg].
- Persona and Shame: the Screenplays of Ingmar Bergman (1972) [screenplays]
- Scenes from a Marriage (1974) [screenplay]
- Four Stories: The Touch, Cries and Whispers, The Hour of the Wolf, and The Passion of Anna (1976) [screenplays]
- The Serpent's Egg (1976) [screenplay]
- From the Life of the Marionettes (1980) [screenplay]
- Fanny and Alexander (1982) [screenplay]
- The Marriage Scenarios: Scenes from a Marriage, Face to Face, and Autumn Sonata (1983) [screenplays]
- A Project for the Theatre (1983) [adaptations of A Doll's House, Miss Julie, and Scenes from a Marriage]
- The Magic Lantern: An Autobiography (1987) [nonfiction]
- Images: My Life in Film (1990) [nonfiction])
- The Best Intentions (1991) [novel]
- Sunday's Children (1993) [novel]
- The Fifth Act (1994, contains Monologue, After the Rehearsal, The Last Scream, In the Presence of a Clown) [plays and screenplays]
- Private Confessions (1996) [novel]

== Style of working ==
=== Repertory company ===
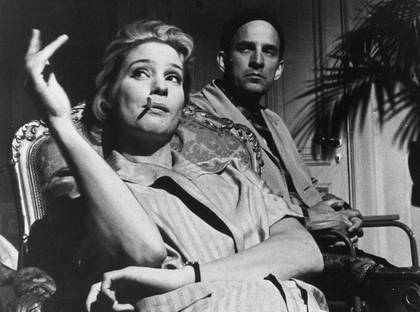
Bergman and actress Ingrid Thulin during the production of The Silence, 1963

Bergman developed a personal "repertory company" of Swedish actors whom he repeatedly cast in his films, including Max von Sydow, Bibi Andersson, Harriet Andersson, Erland Josephson, Ingrid Thulin, Gunnel Lindblom, and Gunnar Björnstrand, each of whom appeared in at least five Bergman features. Norwegian actress Liv Ullmann, who appeared in nine of Bergman's films and one televisual film (Saraband), was the last to join this group (in the film Persona), and ultimately became the most closely associated with Bergman, both artistically and personally. They had a daughter together, Linn Ullmann (born 1966).

In Bergman's working arrangement with Sven Nykvist, his best-known cinematographer, the two men developed sufficient rapport to allow Bergman not to worry about the composition of a shot until the day before it was filmed. On the morning of the shoot, he would briefly speak to Nykvist about the mood and composition he hoped for, and then leave Nykvist to work, lacking interruption or comment until post-production discussion of the next day's work.

=== Financing ===
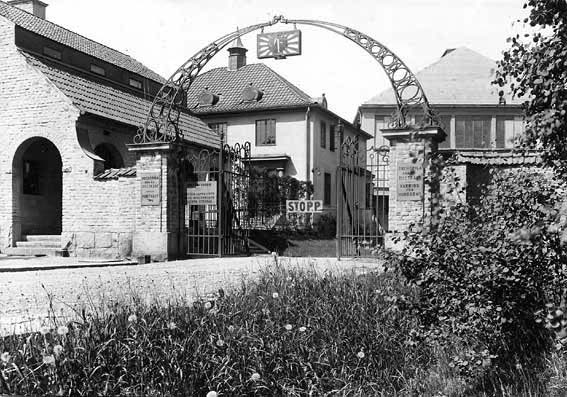
A great number of Bergman's interior scenes were filmed at the Filmstaden studios north of Stockholm.

By Bergman's own account, he never had a problem with funding. He was one of the few film makers of the time who had managed to stay clear of international financing, working out his own techniques for funding films. He cited two reasons for this: one, that he did not live in the United States, which he viewed as obsessed with box-office earnings; and two, that his films tended to be low-budget affairs. (Cries and Whispers, for instance, was finished for about $450,000, while Scenes from a Marriage, a six-episode television feature, cost only $200,000.)

=== Technique ===
Bergman usually wrote his films' screenplays, thinking about them for months or years before starting the actual process of writing, which he viewed as somewhat tedious. His earlier films are carefully constructed and are either based on his plays or written in collaboration with other authors. Bergman stated that in his later works, when on occasion his actors would want to do things differently from his own intention, he would let them, noting that the results were often "disastrous" when he did not do so. As his career progressed, Bergman increasingly let his actors improvise their dialogue. In his later films, he wrote just the ideas informing the scene and allowed his actors to determine the exact dialogue. When viewing daily rushes, Bergman stressed the importance of being critical but unemotive, claiming that he asked himself not if the work was great or terrible, but rather if it was sufficient or needed to be reshot.

=== Subjects ===
Bergman's films usually deal with existential questions of mortality, loneliness, and religious faith. In addition to these cerebral topics, however, sexual desire features in the foreground of most of his films, whether the central event is medieval plague (The Seventh Seal), upper-class family activity in early twentieth century Uppsala (Fanny and Alexander), or contemporary alienation (The Silence). His female characters are usually more in touch with their sexuality than their male equivalents, and unafraid to proclaim it, sometimes with breathtaking overtness (as in Cries and Whispers) as would define the work of "the conjurer," as Bergman called himself in a 1960 TIME cover story. In an interview with Playboy in 1964, he said: "The manifestation of sex is very important, and particularly to me, for above all, I don't want to make merely intellectual films. I want audiences to feel, to sense my films. This to me is much more important than their understanding them." Film, Bergman said, was his demanding mistress. While he was a social democrat as an adult, Bergman stated that "as an artist I'm not politically involved ... I don't make propaganda for either one attitude or the other."

=== Bergman's views on his career ===
When asked in the series of interviews later titled "Ingmar Bergman – 3 dokumentärer om film, teater, Fårö och livet" conducted by Marie Nyreröd for Swedish TV and released in 2004, Bergman said that of his works, he held Winter Light, Persona, and Cries and Whispers in the highest regard. There he also states that he managed to push the envelope of film making in the films Persona and Cries and Whispers. Bergman stated on numerous occasions (for example in the interview book Bergman on Bergman) that The Silence meant the end of the era in which religious questions were a major concern of his films. Bergman said that he would get depressed by his own films: "jittery and ready to cry... and miserable." In the same interview he also stated: "If there is one thing I miss about working with films, it is working with Sven" (Nykvist), the third cinematographer with whom he had collaborated.

=== Theatrical work ===
Although Bergman was universally famous for his contribution to cinema, he was also an active and productive stage director throughout his life. During his studies at what was then Stockholm University College, he became active in its student theatre, where he made a name for himself early on. His first work after graduation was as a trainee-director at a Stockholm theatre. At twenty-six years, he became the youngest theatrical manager in Europe at the Helsingborg City Theatre. He stayed at Helsingborg for three years and then became the director at Gothenburg city theatre from 1946 to 1949.

He became director of the Malmö City Theatre in 1953, and remained for seven years. Many of his star actors were people with whom he began working on stage. He was the director of the Royal Dramatic Theatre in Stockholm from 1960 to 1966, and manager from 1963 to 1966, where he began a long-time collaboration with choreographer Donya Feuer.

After Bergman left Sweden because of the tax evasion incident, he became director of the Residenz Theatre of Munich, West Germany (1977–1984). He remained active in theatre throughout the 1990s and made his final production on stage with Henrik Ibsen's Ghosts at the Brooklyn Academy of Music in 2003.

== Personal life ==
=== Marriages and children ===
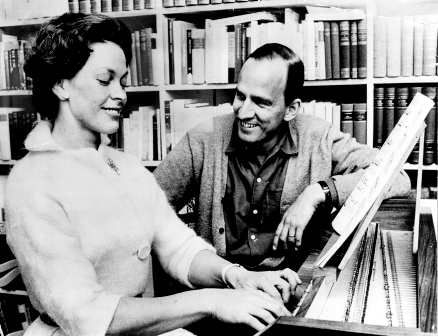
Bergman with fourth wife, Estonian concert pianist Käbi Laretei

Bergman was married five times:

- 25 March 1943 – 1945, to Else Fisher (1 March 1918 – 3 March 2006), choreographer and dancer (divorced). Children:
  - Lena Bergman, actress, born 1943.
- 22 July 1945 – 1950, to Ellen Lundström (23 April 1919 – 6 March 2007), choreographer and film director (divorced). Children:
  - Eva Bergman, film director, born 1945
  - Jan Bergman, film director (1946–2000)
  - the twins Mats and Anna Bergman, both actors and film directors, born in 1948.
- 1951 – 1959, to Gun Grut (1916–1971), journalist and translator (divorced). Children:
  - Ingmar Bergman Jr., retired airline captain, born 1951.
- 1959 – 1969, to Käbi Laretei (14 July 1922 – 31 October 2014), concert pianist (divorced). Children:
  - Daniel Bergman, film director, born 1962.
- 11 November 1971 – 20 May 1995, to Ingrid von Rosen (maiden name Karlebo, 17 January 1930 – 20 May 1995). Children:
  - Maria von Rosen, author, born 1959.

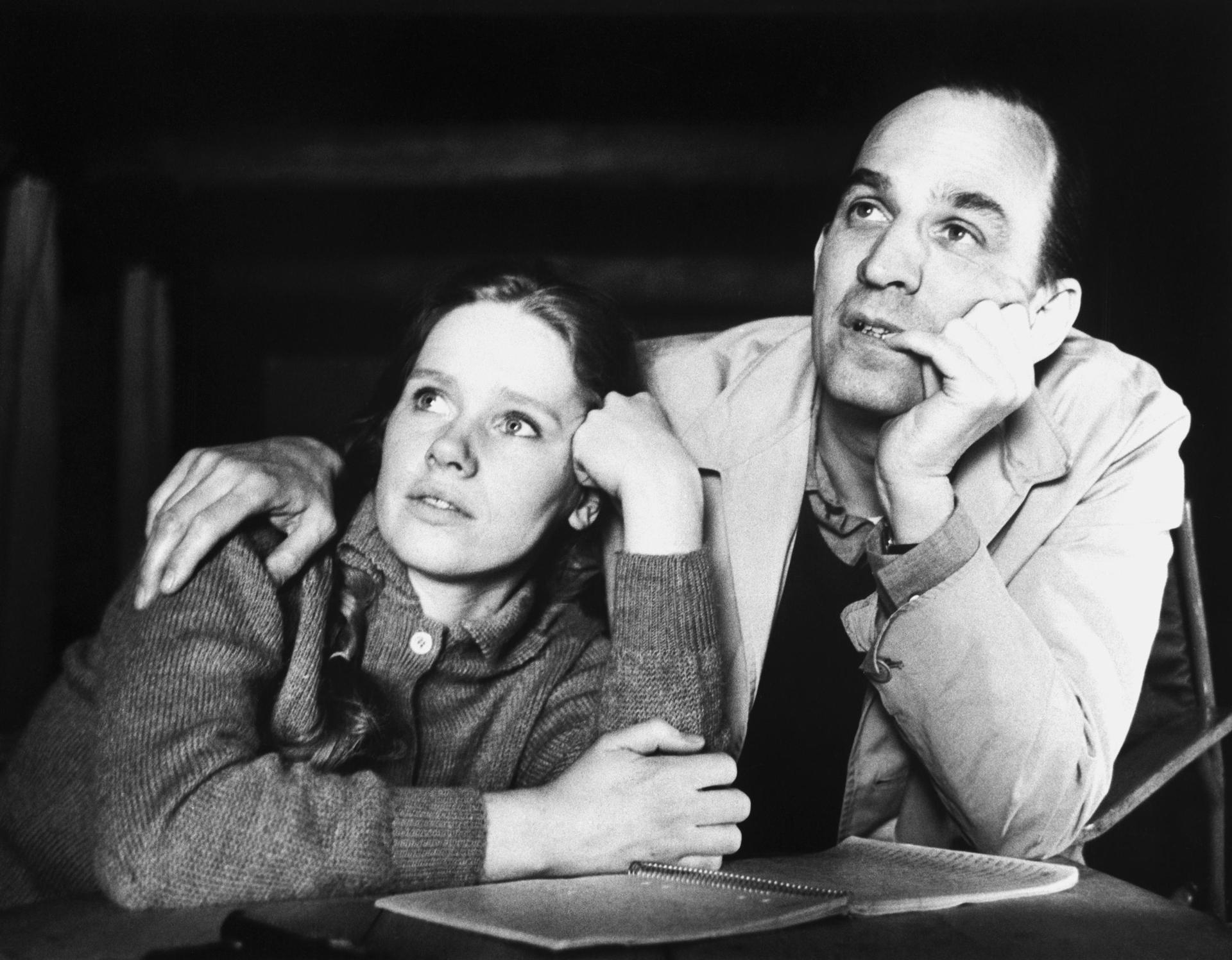
Bergman with Norwegian actress Liv Ullmann in 1968. The couple had a daughter, Linn Ullmann, in 1966

The first four marriages ended in divorce, while the last ended when his wife Ingrid died of stomach cancer in 1995, aged 65. Aside from his marriages, Bergman had romantic relationships with actresses Harriet Andersson (1952–1955), Bibi Andersson (1955–1959), and Liv Ullmann (1965–1970). He was the father of writer Linn Ullmann with Ullmann. In all, Bergman had nine children, one of whom predeceased him. Bergman eventually married all the mothers of his children, with the exception of Liv Ullmann. His daughter with his last wife, Ingrid von Rosen, was born twelve years before their marriage. He had dozens of mistresses throughout his life and would justify the affairs to his various wives by telling them: "I have so many lives."

Although Bergman once described himself as one who had lost his faith in an afterlife, in 2000 he stated that a conversation he had with Erland Josephson helped him to believe that he would see Ingrid again. He said, "I'm not actually afraid of dying. On the contrary, really. I think it'll be interesting." In 2012, Max von Sydow stated to Charlie Rose that he had had many discussions with Bergman about religion which seemed to indicate that Bergman believed in an afterlife and von Sydow said that Bergman contacted him after his death to prove there was indeed a life after death, though he did not elaborate further.

In an early draft of his autobiography, Bergman said he raped his then-girlfriend Karin Lannby. The portion was edited out for the final version.

=== Health ===
Bergman suffered from insomnia and severe stomach problems dating back to childhood. He called his nervous stomach "a calamity as foolish as it is humiliating" and joked that the private lavatories he secured at the theatres in which he worked represented his "most lasting contribution to the history of theatre".

== Awards and nominations ==
In 1958, he won the Best Director award for Brink of Life at the Cannes Film Festival, and won the Golden Bear for Wild Strawberries at the Berlin International Film Festival. In 1960 Bergman was featured in the cover of Time, the first foreign-language filmmaker to do so since Leni Riefenstahl in 1936. In 1971, Bergman received the Irving G. Thalberg Memorial Award at the Academy Awards ceremony. Three of his films (The Virgin Spring, Through a Glass Darkly, and Fanny and Alexander) won the Academy Award for Best Foreign Language Film. In 1997, he was awarded the Palme des Palmes (Palm of the Palms) at the 50th anniversary of the Cannes Film Festival. He won many other awards and has been nominated for numerous other awards.

Academy Awards

Year	Category	Nominated work	Result
1959	Best Original Screenplay	Wild Strawberries	Nominated
1962	Best Original Screenplay	Through a Glass Darkly	Nominated
1973	Best Picture	Cries and Whispers	Nominated
1973	Best Director	Cries and Whispers	Nominated
1973	Best Original Screenplay	Cries and Whispers	Nominated
1976	Best Director	Face to Face	Nominated
1978	Best Original Screenplay	Autumn Sonata	Nominated
1983	Best Director	Fanny and Alexander	Nominated
1983	Best Original Screenplay	Fanny and Alexander	Nominated

Accolades for Bergman's directed films
Year	Film	Academy Awards		BAFTA Awards		Golden Globe Awards		Guldbagge Awards	
Year	Film	Nominations	Wins	Nominations	Wins	Nominations	Wins	Nominations	Wins
1955	Smiles of a Summer Night			3					
1957	Wild Strawberries	1		2		1	1		
1958	The Magician			1					
1960	The Virgin Spring	2	1			1			
1961	Through a Glass Darkly	2	1	2					
1963	The Silence							3	3
1966	Persona			1				2	2
1968	Shame					1		1	1
1972	Cries and Whispers	5	1	2		1		3	3
1973	Scenes from a Marriage			1		2	1		
1975	The Magic Flute	1		1	1	1			
1976	Face to Face	2		1		2	1		
1978	Autumn Sonata	2				2	1		
1982	Fanny and Alexander	6	4	3	1	2	1	3	3
Total		21	7	17	2	13	5	12	12

== Legacy ==
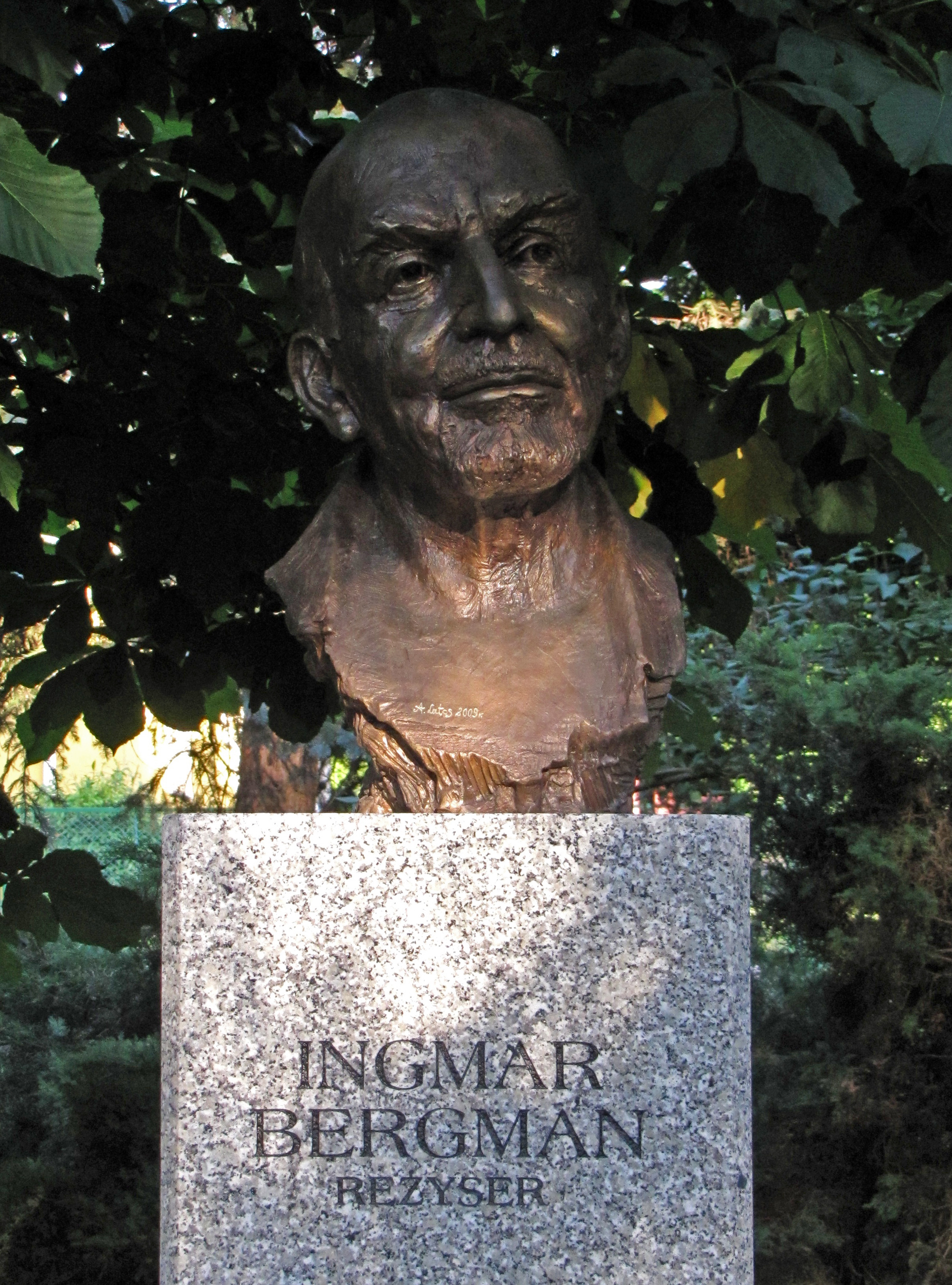
A bust of Bergman in Celebrity Alley in Kielce, Poland

In 1996, Entertainment Weekly ranked Bergman at No. 8 in its "50 Greatest Directors" list. In 2002, Bergman was listed at number nine on the British Film Institute's Sight & Sound list of the top ten film directors of modern times. MovieMaker magazine ranked Bergman at No. 13 on their 2002 list of The 25 Most Influential Directors of All Time. Bergman was ranked at No. 36 on Empire magazine's "Top 40 Greatest Directors of All-Time" list in 2005. In 2007, Total Film magazine ranked Bergman at No. 7 on its "100 Greatest Film Directors Ever" list. In 2017, New York magazine ranked Bergman at number 55 on their list of The 100 Best Screenwriters of All Time.

Stanley Kubrick admired the work of Bergman and expressed it in personal letter: "Your vision of life has moved me deeply, much more deeply than I have ever been moved by any films. I believe you are the greatest film-maker at work today [...], unsurpassed by anyone in the creation of mood and atmosphere, the subtlety of performance, the avoidance of the obvious, the truthfulness and completeness of characterization. To this one must also add everything else that goes into the making of a film; [...] and I shall look forward with eagerness to each of your films." Film critic Philip French referred to Bergman as "one of the greatest artists of the 20th century ... he found in literature and the performing arts a way of both recreating and questioning the human condition." Director Martin Scorsese commented that "it's impossible to overestimate the effect that [his] films had on people." Terrence Rafferty of The New York Times wrote that throughout the 1960s, when Bergman "was considered pretty much the last word in cinematic profundity, his every tic was scrupulously pored over, analyzed, elaborated in ingenious arguments about identity, the nature of film, the fate of the artist in the modern world and so on."

Bergman's work was a point of reference and inspiration for director Woody Allen. He described Bergman as "probably the greatest film artist, all things considered, since the invention of the motion picture camera". Bergman's films are mentioned and praised in Annie Hall and other Allen films. Allen also admired Bergman's longtime director of photography Sven Nykvist and invited him to return as his DP on Crimes and Misdemeanors. Danish Director Thomas Vinterberg has cited Bergman as one of his major influences, "Bergman is always in my head. He is part of my upbringing and I was fortunate to meet him and get advice from him." Todd Field, in an essay he wrote for the Los Angeles Times, recalled Bergman toward the end of his life inviting Field and his wife to a production he directed of Henrik Ibsen’s Ghosts, and the influence this had on him. “Bergman belonged to all of us. He was our tunnel man building the aqueducts of our cinematic collective unconscious. Supplying water to a people who heretofore didn’t know they were thirsty.”

Writer and director Richard Ayoade counts Bergman as one of his inspirations. In 2017, the British Film Institute (BFI) hosted an Ingmar Bergman season and Ayoade said in a Guardian interview that he saw everything in it, "which was one of the best two months ever." The BFI's programme included a discussion with Ayoade on Bergman's 1966 film, Persona, before a screening.Bertrand Tavernier said: "Bergman was the first to bring metaphysics – religion, death, existentialism – to the screen. But the best of Bergman is the way he speaks of women, of the relationship between men and women. He's like a miner digging in search of purity."

After Bergman died, a large archive of notes was donated to the Swedish Film Institute. Among the notes are several unpublished and unfinished scripts both for stage and films, and many more ideas for works in different stages of development. A never-performed play has the title Kärlek utan älskare ("Love without lovers"), and has the note "Complete disaster!" written on the envelope; the play is about a director who disappears and an editor who tries to complete a work he has left unfinished. Other canceled projects include the script for a pornographic film which Bergman abandoned since he did not think it was alive enough, a play about a cannibal, some loose scenes set inside a womb, a film about the life of Jesus, a film about The Merry Widow, and a play with the title Från sperm till spöke ("From sperm to spook"). The Swedish director Marcus Lindeen went through the material, and inspired by Kärlek utan älskare he took samples from many of the works and turned them into a play, titled Arkivet för orealiserbara drömmar och visioner ("The archive for unrealisable dreams and visions"). Lindeen's play premiered on 27 May 2012 at the Stockholm City Theatre.

In 2018, in honor of Bergman's 100th birthday, The Criterion Collection compiled and released a Blu-ray disc box set comprising 39 of Bergman's features. The set spans Bergman's early career, beginning in the 1940s, up to his final film in 2003. The films are organized non-chronologically, and are instead presented in four groupings that mimic the procession of a film festival. Accompanying the discs is a book featuring critical essays on each of the films, intended to guide the viewer through the experience. Upon its release, The New York Times critic Glenn Kenny assessed the set as "impressive and almost exhaustive", and interpreted it as "a fresh case for [Bergman's] continuing importance", in response to criticisms such as Jonathan Rosenbaum's 2007 opinion piece "Scenes From an Overrated Career".

The Ingmar Bergman International Debut Award is awarded annually at the Gothenburg Film Festival, in partnership with the Ingmar Bergman Foundation, the Bergman Estate and the Bergman Center on Fårö. The prize includes a visit to the Bergman Estate as well as to Bergman's personal archive in Stockholm.

== See also ==
- Cinema of Sweden
- List of film director and actor collaborations
