= List of accolades and awards received by Ingmar Bergman =

List of accolades received by Ingmar Bergman
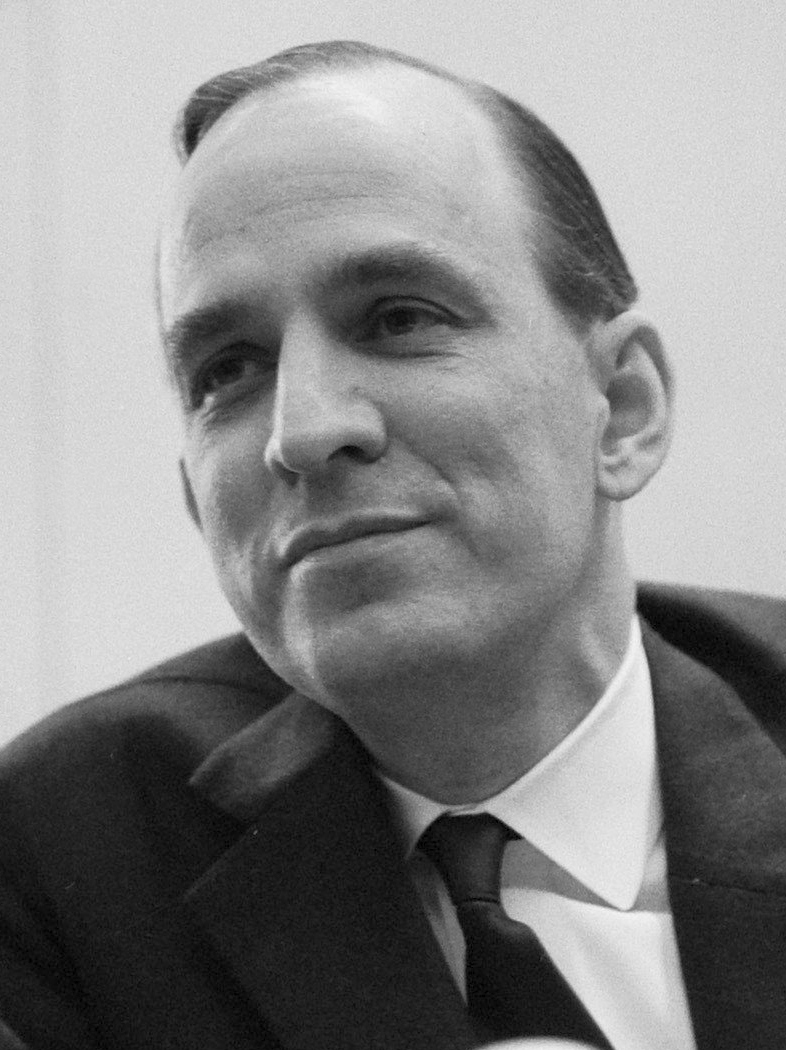
- Bergman in 1966
Accolades
Award	Wins	Nominations
Academy Awards	0	9
BAFTA Film Awards	0	4
BAFTA TV Awards	1	1
Berlin Film Festival	3	4
Cannes Film Festival	8	14
César Awards	1	4
Golden Globes	6	10
Venice Film Festival	5	6

Totals (Note: Certain award groups do not simply award one winner. They acknowledge several different recipients, have runners-up, and have third place. Since this is a specific recognition and is different from losing an award, runner-up mentions are considered wins in this award tally. For simplification and to avoid errors, each award in this list has been presumed to have had a prior nomination.)
- Wins: 64
- Nominations: 113

This article is a List of awards and nominations received by Ingmar Bergman.

Ingmar Bergman (14 July 1918 – 30 July 2007) was a Swedish director, writer, and producer who worked in film, television, theatre and radio. He is recognized as one of the most accomplished and influential filmmakers of all time, and is well known for films such as The Seventh Seal (1957), Wild Strawberries (1957), Persona (1966), Cries and Whispers (1972), and Fanny and Alexander (1982). He has received various accolades including a BAFTA Award, a César Award and six Golden Globe Awards as well as nominations for nine Academy Awards. His films have won prizes at the Berlin International Film Festival, the Cannes Film Festival and the Venice International Film Festival.

Bergman directed over sixty films and documentaries for cinematic release and for television, most of which he also wrote. He also directed over 170 plays. From 1953, he forged a powerful creative partnership with his full-time cinematographer Sven Nykvist. Among his company of actors were Harriet and Bibi Andersson, Liv Ullmann, Gunnar Björnstrand, Erland Josephson, Ingrid Thulin and Max von Sydow. Most of his films were set in Sweden, and numerous films from Through a Glass Darkly (1961) onward were filmed on the island of Fårö.

Over his career he has received various honors including the Irving G. Thalberg Memorial Award in 1970, the a Career Golden Lion in 1971 and the BAFTA Fellowship in 1988. His work often deals with death, illness, faith, betrayal, bleakness and insanity. Philip French referred to Bergman as among the greatest artists of the 20th century. Mick LaSalle compared Bergman's significance in film to that of Virginia Woolf and James Joyce in literature. His admirers include filmmakers such as David Lynch, Martin Scorsese, Woody Allen, Stanley Kubrick and Steven Spielberg.

== Major associations ==
=== Academy Awards ===
Three of his films won the Academy Award for Best Foreign Language Film. The list of his nominations and awards follows:

Year	Category	Nominated work	Result	Ref.
1959	Best Original Screenplay	Wild Strawberries	Nominated	
1960	Best Foreign Language Film (Note: Despite directing the film, due to the Academy of Motion Picture Arts and Sciences guidelines, the statue goes to the country)	The Virgin Spring	Won	
1961	Best Foreign Language Film (Note: Despite directing the film, due to the Academy of Motion Picture Arts and Sciences guidelines, the statue goes to the country)	Through a Glass Darkly	Won	
1962	Best Original Screenplay	Through a Glass Darkly	Nominated	
1970	Irving G. Thalberg Memorial Award		Honored	
1973	Best Picture	Cries and Whispers	Nominated	
1973	Best Director	Cries and Whispers	Nominated	
1973	Best Original Screenplay	Cries and Whispers	Nominated	
1976	Best Director	Face to Face	Nominated	
1978	Best Original Screenplay	Autumn Sonata	Nominated	
1983	Best Director	Fanny and Alexander	Nominated	
1983	Best Original Screenplay	Fanny and Alexander	Nominated	
1983	Best Foreign Language Film (Note: Despite directing the film, due to the Academy of Motion Picture Arts and Sciences guidelines, the statue goes to the country)	Fanny and Alexander	Won	

=== BAFTA Awards ===
Year	Category	Nominated work	Result	Ref.
British Academy Film Awards
1957	Best Film from any Source	Smiles of a Summer Night	Nominated	
1959	Best Film from any Source	Wild Strawberries	Nominated	
1960	Best Film from any Source	The Magician	Nominated	
1963	Best Film from any Source	Through a Glass Darkly	Nominated	
British Academy Television Awards
1976	Best Foreign Television Programme	The Magic Flute	Won	

=== Berlin Film Festival ===
Year	Category	Nominated work	Result	Ref.
1957	Golden Bear	Wild Strawberries	Won	
1957	FIPRESCI Prize	Wild Strawberries	Won	
1961	Golden Bear	Through a Glass Darkly	Nominated	
1961	OCIC Prize	Through a Glass Darkly	Won	

=== Cannes Film Festival ===
Year	Category	Nominated work	Result	Ref.
1947	Palme d'Or	A Ship Bound for India	Nominated	
1956	Best Poetic Humour	Smiles of a Summer Night	Won	
1956	Palme d'Or	Smiles of a Summer Night	Nominated	
1957	Special Jury Prize	The Seventh Seal	Won	
1957	Palme d'Or	The Seventh Seal	Nominated	
1958	Best Director	Brink of Life	Won	
1958	Palme d'Or	Brink of Life	Nominated	
1960	Special Mention	The Virgin Spring	Won	
1960	FIPRESCI Prize	The Virgin Spring	Won	
1960	Palme d'Or	The Virgin Spring	Nominated	
1973	Vulcan Technical Grand Prize	Cries and Whispers	Won	
1997	Palme of the Palmes	For his whole body of work	Won	
1998	Prize of the Ecumenical Jury	For his whole body of work	Won	
1998	Un Certain Regard Award	In the Presence of a Clown	Nominated	

=== Cesar Awards ===
Year	Category	Nominated work	Result	Ref.
1976	Best Foreign Film	The Magic Flute	Nominated	
1979	Best Foreign Film	Autumn Sonata	Nominated	
1984	Best Foreign Film	Fanny and Alexander	Won	
2005	Best European Film	Saraband	Nominated	

=== Golden Globe Awards ===
Year	Category	Nominated work	Result	Ref.
1959	Best Foreign Language Film	Wild Strawberries	Won	
1960	Best Foreign Language Film	The Virgin Spring	Won	
1968	Best Foreign Language Film	Shame	Nominated	
1972	Best Foreign Language Film	Cries and Whispers	Nominated	
1974	Best Foreign Language Film	Scenes from a Marriage	Won	
1975	Best Foreign Language Film	The Magic Flute	Nominated	
1976	Best Foreign Language Film	Face to Face	Won	
1978	Best Foreign Language Film	Autumn Sonata	Won	
1983	Best Director	Fanny and Alexander	Nominated	
1983	Best Foreign Language Film	Fanny and Alexander	Won	

=== Venice Film Festival ===
Year	Category	Nominated work	Result	Ref.
1958	Pasinetti Award	Wild Strawberries	Won	
1959	Grand Jury Prize	The Magician	Won	
1959	New Cinema Award	The Magician	Won	
1959	Pasinetti Award	The Magician	Won	
1959	Golden Lion	The Magician	Nominated	
1983	FIPRESCI Prize	Fanny and Alexander	Won	

== Miscellaneous awards ==
Award	Year	Category	Nominated work	Result	Ref.
Bodil Award	1957	Best European Film	Smiles of a Summer Night	Won	
Bodil Award	1959	Best European Film	Wild Strawberries	Won	
Bodil Award	1974	Best European Film	Cries and Whispers	Won	
Bodil Award	1979	Best European Film	Autumn Sonata	Won	
David di Donatello Award	1973	Best Foreign Director	Cries and Whispers	Won	
David di Donatello Award	1984	Best Foreign Director	Fanny and Alexander	Won	
David di Donatello Award	1984	Best Foreign Film	Fanny and Alexander	Won	
David di Donatello Award	1984	Best Foreign Screenplay	Fanny and Alexander	Won	
Directors Guild of America Award	1983	Outstanding Directing – Feature Film	Fanny and Alexander	Nominated	
European Film Awards	1988	European Film Academy Lifetime Achievement Award		Won	
Guldbagge Awards	1964	Best Film	The Silence	Won	
Guldbagge Awards	1964	Best Director	The Silence	Won	
Guldbagge Awards	1967	Best Film	Persona	Won	
Guldbagge Awards	1973	Best Film	Cries and Whispers	Won	
Guldbagge Awards	1983	Best Film	Fanny and Alexander	Won	
Guldbagge Awards	1983	Best Director	Fanny and Alexander	Won	
Guldbagge Awards	1993	Best Screenplay	The Best Intentions	Won	
Nastro d'Argento	1960	Best Non-Italian Film	Wild Strawberries	Won	
Nastro d'Argento	1961	Best Non-Italian Film	The Seventh Seal	Won	
Nastro d'Argento	1974	Best Non-Italian Film	Cries and Whispers	Won	
Nastro d'Argento	1979	Best Non-Italian Film	Autumn Sonata	Won	
Nastro d'Argento	1984	Best Non-Italian Film	Fanny and Alexander	Won	
Nastro d'Argento	1996	Nastro d'Argento Lifetime Achievement Award		Won	
National Board of Review	1959	Best Foreign Language Film	Wild Strawberries	Won	
National Board of Review	1969	Best Foreign Language Film	Shame	Won	
National Board of Review	1973	Best Director	Cries and Whispers	Won	
National Board of Review	1973	Best Foreign Language Film	Cries and Whispers	Won	
National Board of Review	1976	Best Foreign Language Film	Scenes from a Marriage	Nominated	
National Board of Review	1978	Best Foreign Language Film	Autumn Sonata	Won	
National Board of Review	1978	Best Director	Autumn Sonata	Won	
National Board of Review	1984	Best Foreign Language Film	Fanny and Alexander	Won	
National Society of Film Critics	1968	Best Film	Persona	Won	
National Society of Film Critics	1968	Best Director	Persona	Won	
National Society of Film Critics	1968	Best Screenplay	Persona	2nd place	
National Society of Film Critics	1968	Best Film	Shame	Won	
National Society of Film Critics	1968	Best Director (Note: (for two films other one Hour of the Wolf))	Shame	Won	
National Society of Film Critics	1968	Best Screenplay	Shame	2nd place	
National Society of Film Critics	1971	Best Director	The Passion of Anna	Won	
National Society of Film Critics	1972	Best Screenplay	Cries and Whispers	Won	
National Society of Film Critics	1975	Best Film	Scenes from a Marriage	Won	
National Society of Film Critics	1975	Best Director	Scenes from a Marriage	Runner-up	
National Society of Film Critics	1975	Best Screenplay	Scenes from a Marriage	Won	
National Society of Film Critics	1975	Special Award	The Magic Flute	Won	
New York Film Critics Circle	1973	Best Film	Cries and Whispers	Won	
New York Film Critics Circle	1973	Best Director	Cries and Whispers	Won	
New York Film Critics Circle	1973	Best Screenplay	Cries and Whispers	Won	
New York Film Critics Circle	1974	Best Film	Scenes from a Marriage	Runner-up	
New York Film Critics Circle	1974	Best Director	Scenes from a Marriage	Runner-up	
New York Film Critics Circle	1974	Best Screenplay	Scenes from a Marriage	Won	
New York Film Critics Circle	1978	Best Director	Autumn Sonata	3rd place	
New York Film Critics Circle	1978	Best Foreign Language Film	Autumn Sonata	2nd place	
New York Film Critics Circle	1983	Best Film	Fanny and Alexander	Won	
New York Film Critics Circle	1983	Best Foreign Language Film	Fanny and Alexander	Won	
Los Angeles Film Critics Association	1976	Best Foreign Language Film	Face to Face	Won	
Los Angeles Film Critics Association	1984	Best Foreign Language Film	Fanny and Alexander	Won	

== Honorary awards ==
Organizations	Year	Award	Result	Ref.
American Academy of Arts and Sciences	1961	Foreign Honorary Member	Honored	
Praemium Erasmianum Foundation	1965	Erasmus Prize	Honored	
Venice International Film Festival	1971	Career Golden Lion	Honored	
City of Frankfurt	1976	Goethe Prize	Honored	
President of France	1985	Commandeur de la Légion d'honneur	Honored	
British Academy Film Awards	1988	BAFTA Fellowship	Honored	
The Imperial Family of Japan The Japan Art Association	1991	Praemium Imperiale	Honored	
JPMorgan Chase Bank	1995	The Dorothy and Lillian Gish Prize	Honored	
Bank of Sweden	2015	Bergman's portrait is featured on the new 200 kronor banknote	Honored	

== Reception and recognition ==
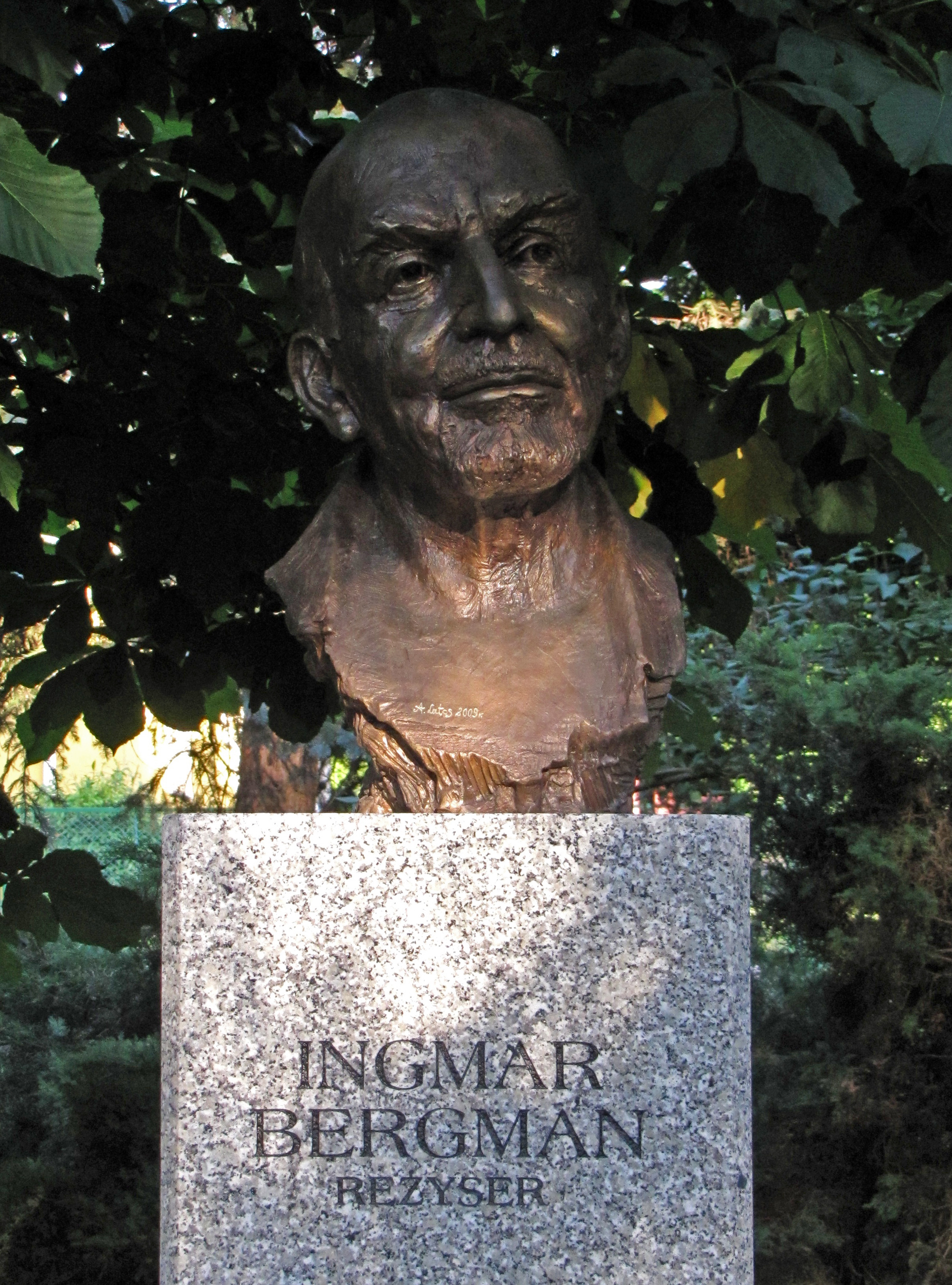
Bust of Ingmar Bergman in Celebrity Alley in Kielce, Poland

Terrence Rafferty of The New York Times wrote that throughout the 1960s, when Bergman "was considered pretty much the last word in cinematic profundity, his every tic was scrupulously pored over, analyzed, elaborated in ingenious arguments about identity, the nature of film, the fate of the artist in the modern world and so on." Many filmmakers have praised Bergman and some have also cited his work as an influence on their own including:

- Andrei Tarkovsky (Note: held Bergman in very high regard, noting him and Robert Bresson as his two favourite filmmakers, stating: "I am only interested in the views of two people: one is called Bresson and one called Bergman." Such was Bergman's influence, Tarkovsky's last film was made in Sweden with Sven Nykvist, Bergman's longtime cinematographer, and several of Bergman's favoured actors including Erland Josephson. Bergman likewise had great respect for Tarkovsky, stating: "Tarkovsky for me is the greatest director.")
- Alejandro González Iñárritu (Note: while entering the Berg-man compound (Bergman's house) on the remote island of Fårö for a documentary called Trespassing Bergman stated "If cinema was a religion, this would be Mecca, the Vatican. This is the center of it all.")
- Bertrand Tavernier (Note: stated: "Bergman was the first to bring metaphysics — religion, death, existentialism — to the screen ... but the best of Bergman is the way he speaks of women, of the relationship between men and women. He's like a miner digging in search of purity.")
- Nuri Bilge Ceylan
- Steven Soderbergh
- David Lynch
- Wes Craven
- Pedro Almodóvar
- Jean-Luc Godard
- Robert Altman
- Adoor Gopalakrishnan
- Olivier Assayas
- Francis Ford Coppola (Note: stated: "My all-time favorite because he embodies passion, emotion and has warmth.")
- Guillermo del Toro (Note: said: "Bergman as a fabulist — my favorite — is absolutely mesmerizing.")
- Asghar Farhadi
- Todd Field (Note: stated: "He was our tunnel man building the aqueducts of our cinematic collective unconscious.")
- Federico Fellini (Note: said: "I have a profound admiration for him (Bergman) and for his work, even though I haven't seen all of his films. First of all, he is a master of his métier. Secondly, he is able to make things mysterious, compelling, colorful and, at times, repulsive.")
- Woody Allen (Note: has referred to Bergman as "probably the greatest film artist, all things considered, since the invention of the motion picture camera". He said, "For me it was Wild Strawberries. Then The Seventh Seal and The Magician. That whole group of films that came out then told us that Bergman was a magical filmmaker. There had never been anything like it, this combination of intellectual artist and film technician. His technique was sensational." Allen has credited Bergman with inventing "a film vocabulary that suited what he wanted to say, that had never really been done before. He'd put the camera on one person's face close and leave it there, and just leave it there and leave it there. It was the opposite of what you learned to do in film school, but it was enormously effective and entertaining.")
- Krzysztof Kieślowski (Note: stated: "This man is one of the few film directors — perhaps the only one in the world — to have said as much about human nature as Dostoyevsky or Camus.")
- Stanley Kubrick (Note: stated: "I believe Ingmar Bergman, Vittorio De Sica and Federico Fellini are the only three filmmakers in the world who are not just artistic opportunists. By this I mean they don't just sit and wait for a good story to come along and then make it. They have a point of view which is expressed over and over and over again in their films, and they themselves write or have original material written for them." Kubrick praised Bergman as "The Greatest film-maker, unsurpassed by anyone in the creation of mood and atmosphere, the subtlety of performance, the avoidance of the obvious, the truthfulness and completeness of characterization.")
- Ang Lee (Note: stated: "For me the filmmaker Bergman is the greatest performer of all...","He (Bergman) is like God to me. I will take inspiration. I won't dare to imitate")
- François Ozon
- Park Chan-wook
- Éric Rohmer (Note: stated: "The Seventh Seal is the most beautiful film ever.")
- Marjane Satrapi
- Mamoru Oshii
- Paul Schrader (Note: stated: "I would not have made any of my films or written scripts such as Taxi Driver had it not been for Ingmar Bergman. What he has left is a legacy greater than any other director. I think the extraordinary thing that Bergman will be remembered for, other than his body of work, was that he probably did more than anyone to make cinema a medium of personal and introspective value.")
- Martin Scorsese (Note: said: "I guess I'd put it like this: if you were alive in the '50s and the '60s and of a certain age, a teenager on your way to becoming an adult, and you wanted to make films, I don't see how you couldn't be influenced by Bergman. You would have had to make a conscious effort, and even then, the influence would have snuck through.")
- Steven Spielberg (Note: stated: "His love for the cinema almost gives me a guilty conscience.")
- Satyajit Ray (Note: stated: "I have great admiration for Bergman...It's Bergman whom I continue to be fascinated by. I think he's remarkable. I envy his stock company, because given actors like that one could do extraordinary things.")
- André Téchiné
- Liv Ullmann
- Lars von Trier (Note: in reference to having once sent Bergman a letter, jokingly said, "I have seen all his movies, he is a great source of inspiration to me. He was like a father to me. But he treated me in the same way he treated all his children. No interest whatsoever!")

== Legacy in popular culture ==
A Bergman-themed parody spoofs the allegory of cheating death (Bergman's The Seventh Seal) in the sketch comedy show Saturday Night Live season 1 (ep. 23, 24 July 1976). The sketch, titled "Swedish Movie", is somberly narrated in the third-person by a Swedish-speaking Death (Tom Schiller) with English subtitles scrolling. The baleful voice-over dialogue, revealed to be emanating from the apparition of Death personified, imposes upon dreamily preoccupied lovers Sven (Chevy Chase) and Inger (Louise Lasser) who send a not-so-silently jeering Death out for pizza.

Monty Python's The Meaning of Life includes a sketch based on The Seventh Seal in which middle-class weekenders at an isolated farmhouse are visited by The Grim Reaper.

A television spoof of Persona appeared in an episode of the Canadian comedy series SCTV in the late 1970s. SCTV later aired another Bergman parody, this time of Scenes From A Marriage that featured actor Martin Short portraying comedian Jerry Lewis as the star of a fictional Bergman film called Scenes From An Idiot's Marriage.

Bill & Ted's Bogus Journey includes a further spoof on the theme of playing games with Death from Bergman's The Seventh Seal. Bill and Ted are set to play a game with Death. Rather than chess, they play checkers. When Bill and Ted win, Death challenges them to a best of three match, wherein they play Battleship and other games from popular culture.

The Muppets franchise had a spoof of Bergman's style in a segment entitled "Silent Strawberries" from the TV special, The Muppets Go to the Movies.

In Season 2 Episode 2 of Welcome to Sweden, Jason Priestley asks to meet Ingmar Bergman.

== Directed Academy Award performances ==
Bergman directed two Oscar nominated performances.

Year	Performer	Film	Result
Academy Award for Best Actress
1976	Liv Ullmann	Face to Face	Nominated
1979	Ingrid Bergman	Autumn Sonata	Nominated

== Exhibitions ==
- Ingmar Bergman.The Image Maker, Multimedia Art Museum, Moscow, 2012
- Ingmar Bergman: The Man Who Asked Hard Questions, Multimedia Art Museum, Moscow, 2012

== See also ==
- Cinema of Sweden
- List of film collaborations

== Bibliography ==
- Bergman on Bergman: Interviews with Ingmar Bergman. By Stig Björkman, Torsten Manns, and Jonas Sima; translated by Paul Britten Austin. Simon & Schuster, New York. Swedish edition copyright 1970; English translation 1973.
- Filmmakers on filmmaking: the American Film Institute seminars on motion pictures and television (edited by Joseph McBride). Boston, Houghton Mifflin Co., 1983.
- Images: my life in film, Ingmar Bergman. Translated by Marianne Ruuth. New York, Arcade Pub., 1994, ISBN 1-55970-186-2
- Steene, Birgitta (1 January 2005). Ingmar Bergman: A Reference Guide. Amsterdam University Press. ISBN 9789053564066.
- The Magic Lantern, Ingmar Bergman. Translated by Joan Tate New York, Viking Press, 1988, ISBN 0-670-81911-5
- The Demons of Modernity: Ingmar Bergman and European Cinema, John Orr, Berghahn Books, 2014.
- Gado, Frank (1986). The Passion of Ingmar Bergman. Duke University Press. ISBN 0822305860.

Awards and achievements
Preceded by Henri-Georges Clouzot for The Mystery of Picasso	Prix du Jury; 1957 for The Seventh Seal	Succeeded by Jacques Tati for Mon Oncle
Preceded by Robert Bresson for A Man Escaped	Prix de la mise en scène 1958 for Brink of Life	Succeeded by François Truffaut for The 400 Blows
Preceded by Sidney Lumet for 12 Angry Men	Golden Bear; 1958 for Wild Strawberries	Succeeded by Claude Chabrol for Les Cousins
Preceded by Alfred Hitchcock	Irving G. Thalberg Memorial Award; 1971	Succeeded by Lawrence Weingarten
Preceded by Orson Welles	Career Golden Lion; 1971	Succeeded by Charles Chaplin, Anatali Golovnia, Billy Wilder
Preceded by Stanley Kubrick for A Clockwork Orange	New York Film Critics Circle Award for Best Director; 1972 for Cries and Whispers	Succeeded by François Truffaut for Day for Night
Preceded by Peter Bogdanovitch for The Last Picture Show	New York Film Critics Circle Award for Best Screenplay; 1972 for Cries and Whispers	Succeeded by George Lucas, Gloria Katz, Willard Huyck for American Graffiti
Preceded by George Lucas, Gloria Katz, Willard Huyck for American Graffiti	New York Film Critics Circle Award for Best Screenplay; 1974 for Scenes from a Marriage	Succeeded by François Truffaut, Suzanne Schiffman, Jean Gruault for The Story of Adele H.
Preceded by Sydney Pollack for Tootsie	New York Film Critics Circle Award for Best Director; 1983 for Fanny and Alexander	Succeeded by David Lean for A Passage to India
