= Anna Serner =

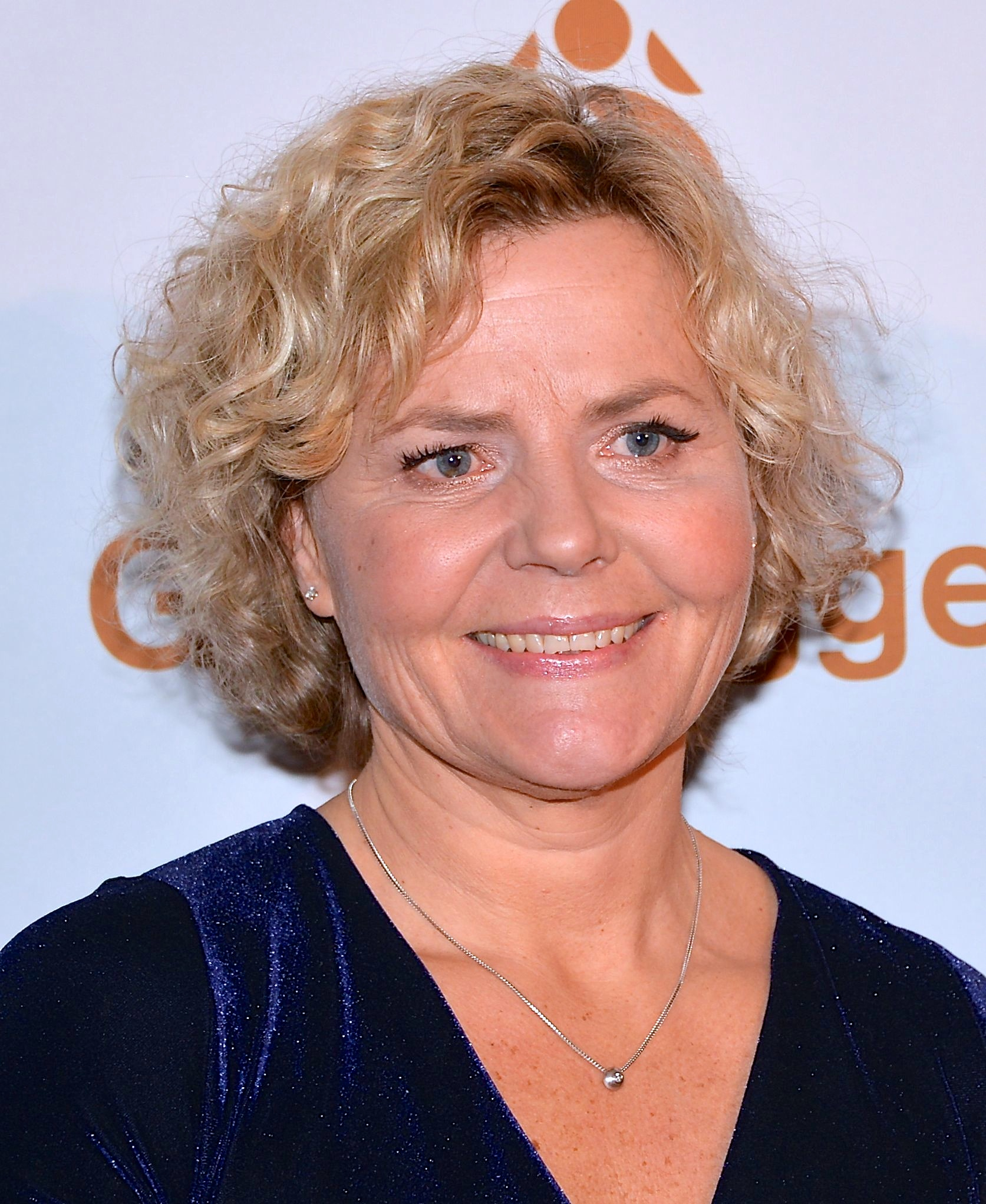
- Anna Serner at the 2013 Guldbagge Awards
- Born: 11 October 1964 (age 61); Stockholm
- Occupations: Legal professional, public speaker, CEO
- Known for: Former CEO of the Swedish Film Institute

Anna Serner (born 11 October 1964) is a Swedish legal professional, public speaker and former CEO of the Swedish Film Institute (2011–2021).

== Early life and education ==
Anna Serner was born on 11 October 1964 in Stockholm, the daughter of the legal professional Uncas Serner and dentist May Hoffmann-Serner.

She has a degree in law.

== Career ==
Serner was CEO of the Advertising Association of Sweden (Reklamförbundet) from 1998 to 2006, and also ran her own marketing communications consultancy business for two years from around 2009 to 2011.

She was managing director of the Swedish Media Publishers' Association (Tidningsutgivarna), where she was active in public debate on freedom of speech and the media's role in society.

Serner has wide experience of board level appointments, including Stockholm University of the Arts, Polarbröd, Berghs School of Communication, Folkoperan, Fanzingo and the Anna Lindh Academy She has also was an expert on various Swedish government commissions, including one on copyright (2010). In addition, she undertook a two-year course in practical filmmaking at the Stockholm School of Film as well as film studies at Stockholm University.

Serner has given lectures and spoken widely on law, advertising, creativity, and management.

On 1 October 2011 she succeeded Cissi Elwin as CEO of the Swedish Film Institute (SFI).

On 29 June 2018 Serner hosted the popular Sveriges Radio radio show Sommar i P1.

=== Swedish Film Institute ===
Serner's tenure as CEO of the Swedish Film Institute was marked by her notable work for gender equality in the film industry. An outspoken feminist, Serner has been a frequent keynote speaker and panelist on this topic.

In 2016 Anna Serner presented the initiative 5050x2020 at the Cannes Film Festival, aiming to raise international awareness regarding the issue of gender equality in film production, based on Sweden's prominent position. The year after, SFI and WIFT Nordic presented "50/50 by 2020 – Global Reach", a seminar at the Cannes Film Market focusing on how the work on equality is proceeding outside of Sweden.

In 2018, with support from the Cannes Film Festival, the SFI arranged "Take Two: Next moves for #MeToo". Together with the then Swedish Minister for Culture and Democracy Alice Bah Kuhnke and the French Minister of Culture, Françoise Nyssen, Serner hosted an event concerning the work against sexual harassment and the misuse of power against women, with focus on the film industry. With a total of five Ministers of Culture from different countries attending, the event marked a shift at an international level for equality in the film industry. The same year, in co-operation with the Berlin International Film Festival, the seminar "Closing the Gap" was arranged. Anna Serner sat on a panel with representatives from WIFT Germany and WIFT Nordic to discuss how quality will be ensured through rewarding equality and diversity at the financing stage.

In April 2021, Serner announced that she would be stepping down in October 2021. Only the institute´s founder Harry Schein was CEO for longer (1963-1970, 1972-1978). In November 2021, Anette Novak was appointed Serner's successor, with Mathias Rosengren (Head of the Film Heritage department at the Swedish Film Institute) acting CEO during the interim period.
