= Stockenström =

Stockenström is a surname. Notable people with the surname include:

- Andries Stockenström (1792–1864), Cape Colony army officer and politician
- Andries Stockenström (judge) (1844–1880), Cape Colony judge
- Wilma Stockenström (born 1933), South African writer, translator, and actor

== See also ==
- Stockenström baronets
