= Harry Schein =

Austrian-born Swedish chemical engineer, writer and company executive (1924-2006)

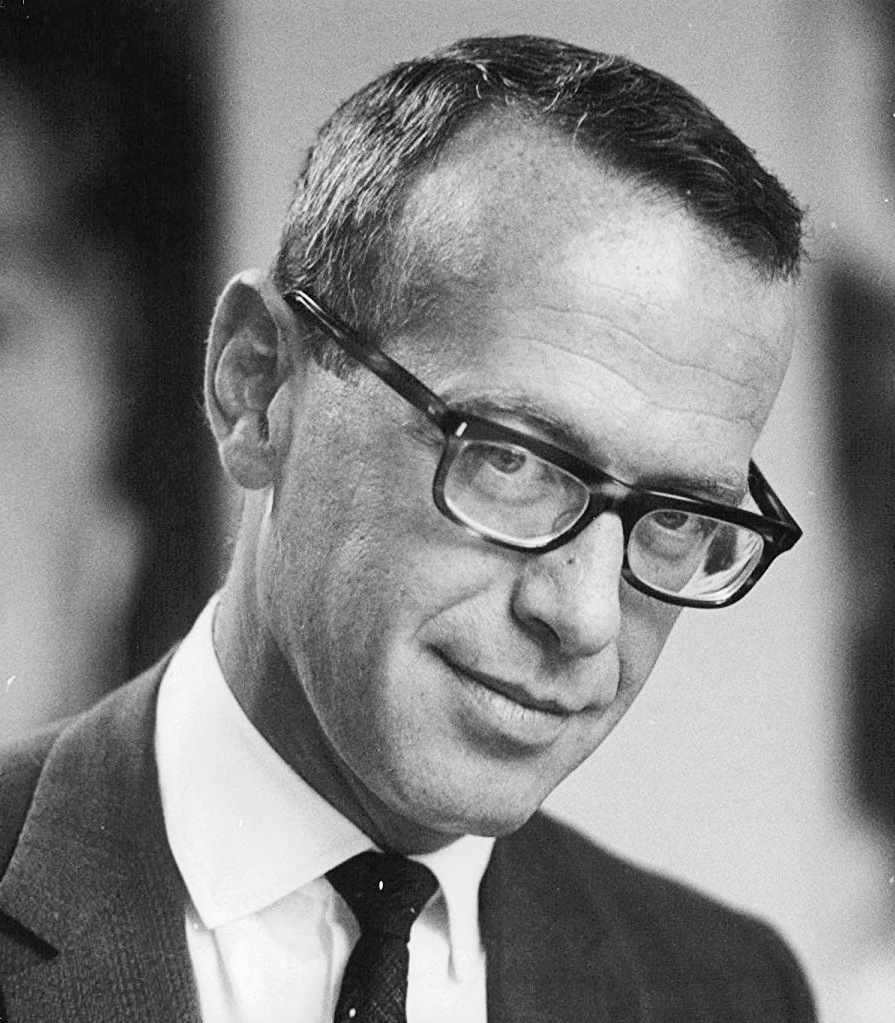
- Harry Schein in 1964.
- Born: Harry Leo Schein; 13 October 1924; Vienna, Austria
- Died: 11 February 2006 (aged 81); Danderyd, Sweden
- Occupations: Company executive, author, columnist, chemical engineer, innovator
- Years active: 1944–2005
- Spouse: Ingrid Thulin (m. 1956–1989)

Harry Leo Schein (13 October 1924 – 11 February 2006) was an Austrian-born Swedish chemical engineer, writer and a major figure in Swedish culture. Born in Vienna, Schein was a founder of the Swedish Film Institute and acted as its first Managing Director from 1963 to 1978.

He is best known for his role in pushing through the film reform of 1963, which ensured that 10 percent of the money from cinema ticket sales was handed to a central film organization. This system guaranteed continuous production of Swedish films for several decades. After the film reform, there was a golden age for Swedish film with Ingmar Bergman, Bo Widerberg and Jan Troell as leading names.

Schein was often engaged in public debates and demonstrated a distinctive understanding of the use of media.

Schein was also a columnist in Dagens Nyheter for more than 20 years, and wrote several books on current issues. He also published several largely autobiographical books, including Schein (1980) and Sluten (1995). At the 7th Guldbagge Awards he won a Special Achievement award.

Schein was married to the Swedish actress Ingrid Thulin from 1956 to 1989 and was a close friend of Swedish statesman and prime minister Olof Palme. He died in 2006 in Danderyd.

== Sources ==
- Lars Ilshammar, Pelle Snickars and Per Vesterlund: Citizen Schein, 2010.
