= Swedish Film Database =

Internet database of the Swedish Film Institute

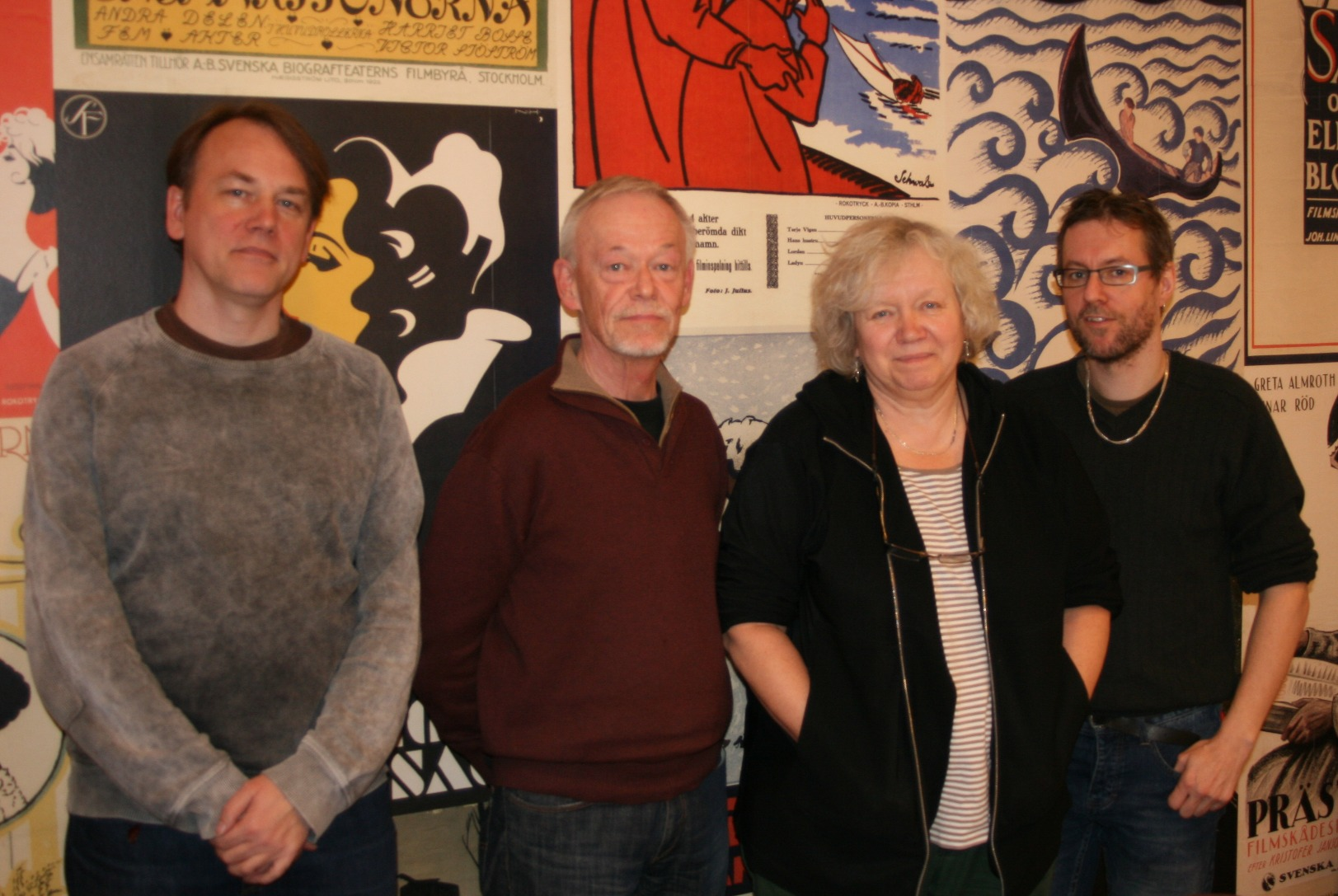
The editors of the Swedish film database in December 2009

The Swedish Film Database (Swedish: Svensk filmdatabas) is an Internet database about Swedish films, published by the Swedish Film Institute. It contains information about all Swedish films from 1897 onwards and foreign films that had their first cinema release in Sweden. It also provides many biographies of actors, directors, producers and others who have participated in Swedish films over the years. It is created with the support of the Bank of Sweden Tercentenary Foundation. The database comprises about 62,000 films (17,000 Swedish films) and 265,000 people.
