= Swedish Film Institute =

Swedish foundation

Coordinates: 59°20′24″N 18°06′12″E

Swedish Film Institute logo

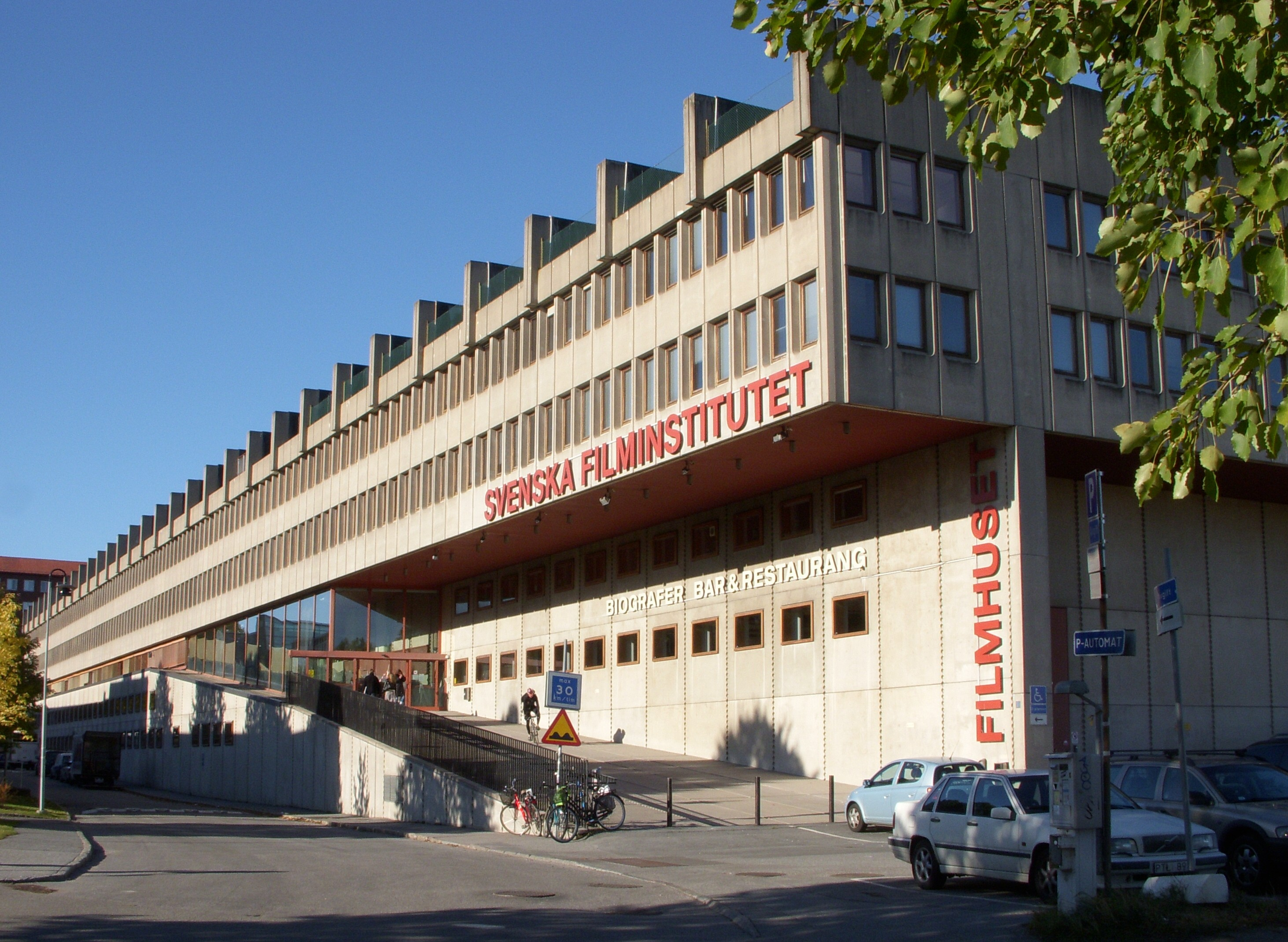
Filmhuset ("House of Film") building in Stockholm, home of the Swedish Film Institute

The Swedish Film Institute (Swedish: Svenska Filminstitutet, SFI) is a statutory body located in Stockholm, Sweden that supports the Swedish film industry. Founded in 1963 (63 years ago), the institute is responsible for administering the annual Guldbagge Awards, and for managing the Swedish Film Database. Notable CEOs of the institute include founder-director Harry Schein (1963–1970 and 1972–1978) and Anna Serner (2011–2021). Serner is known for creating an initiative which aimed for gender parity in the film industry. Since mid-April 2024 the CEO is Anna Croneman.

== History ==
The Swedish Film Institute (Svenska Filminstitutet, or SFI), like the Swedish Film Academy, has its origins in the Swedish Film Society (Svenska Filmsamfundet), which was established in October 1933. The society created a film museum, which would contain archival material of all kinds. In 1938 the film archives were given a home at the National Museum of Science and Technology (Tekniska museet) in Stockholm.

In 1940, the society's collections gained independent status, and were renamed the Film Historic Collections (Filmhistoriska samlingarna), but continued to be held at the museum, and became a member of the International Federation of Film Archives in 1946.

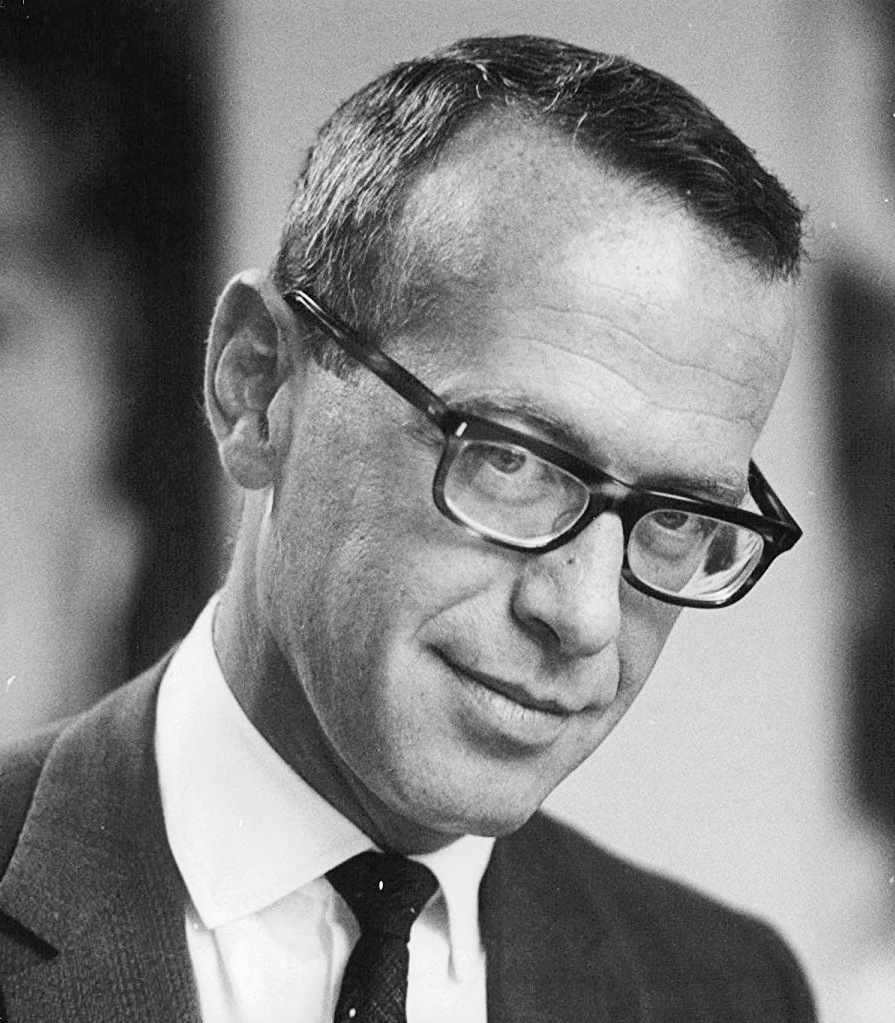
Harry Schein in 1964

The Swedish Film Institute was founded in 1963 to support and develop the Swedish film industry, founded by film critic and businessman Harry Schein (1924-2006), who also became its first CEO. Schein and the Minister of Finance, Gunnar Sträng, were the architects of the Film Reform at this time. The government and film industry signed an agreement that exempted cinemas from entertainment tax, in return for a ten percent levy on ticket sales, which would be paid to the SFI. The SFI could then use that for further funding of new films, as well as for maintaining the archives.

On 16 March 1964, the Film Historic Collections were donated to the institute, becoming the Film Archive of the Swedish Film Institute. Also in 1964, the Film School (Filmskolan) was opened.

In 1967, the Swedish Film Academy (Svenska Filmakademin), with Gösta Werner as first president, grew out of the Film Society.

From the late 1960s until 1993, the institute produced films, and there was a film school run by the institute. In 1970, the film school became an independent body, the University College of Film, Radio, Television and Theatre (Dramatiska institutet). The institute stopped producing films in 1993, and a film commissioner system was introduced.

In 2016, the institute restarted theatrical distribution, enabling cinemas in Sweden to screen digitised films from the archive.

=== Funding and roles ===
From the beginning, the activities and funding of the institute were regulated by the Film Agreement with the Government of Sweden. This was renegotiated at approximately 5-year intervals until 2016. In 1973 the government gave direct grants to the institute. In 1982 the video industry joined the agreement, followed by Sveriges Television and Nordisk Television (now TV4) in 1992. In 1998, the video industry left the agreement; in 2006 the remaining Swedish television companies joined. From 1 January 2017 the Swedish Film Institute has been solely financed by state funding. Prior to 2017, SFI was co-financed by the government as well as others in the film industry, per the Film Agreement. New legislation was introduced from 1 January 2017 determining film policy and putting the government in charge of all regulation and financing of the film industry. The aims, goals and financing however remained "more or less the same".

In 2024, the government commissioned a new inquiry into the film industry.

== Description ==
The institute is a statutory body governed by the Film Bill, and fully funded by the Swedish Government through the Ministry of Culture.

== Filmhuset ==
The institute is housed in the Filmhuset ("House of Film") located in Gärdet, Östermalm, in Stockholm. The building, completed in 1970, was designed in Brutalist style by architect Peter Celsing, and built between 1968 and 1971. It was designed to resemble a camera, with an exposed concrete façade resembling filmstrips. It underwent a major renovation in 2008, creating open-plan offices. The building is listed as "code blue", the highest ranking in terms of cultural and historical value of buildings by the Stockholm City Museum (Stadsmuseet Stockholm).

Filmhuset houses a large archive, containing books and magazines on film.

It also contains two theatres, Bio Victor and Bio Mauritz, named after Victor Sjöström and Mauritz Stiller, which are available for hire. The movie club Cinemateket uses the theatres to screen a wide program of masterpieces, cult rarities, world cinema, and classics of cinema.

Filmhuset is also the main venue for the Stockholm Industry Days of the annual Stockholm International Film Festival. Here, works-in-progress are presented, and master classes and seminars are held.

== Functions ==
The Swedish Film Institute supports Swedish filmmaking, and allocates grants for production, distribution, and screening of Swedish films in Sweden. It also promotes Swedish cinema internationally, and preserve's Sweden's film heritage. Its official functions since the 2017 have been described thus: to "support the development and production of valuable quality films; contribute to the international distribution of Swedish quality films; support the Swedish film heritage; the pedagogical film education of young people; and an open, democratic society with freedom of expression".

The Institute publishes the Swedish Film Database, an Internet database about Swedish films and filmmakers.

=== Awards ===
The Swedish Film Institute has organised the annual Guldbagge Awards since 1964.

The Ingmar Bergman Award, initiated by legendary Swedish film director Ingmar Bergman, was awarded by the SFI between 1978 and 2007 as a complement to the Guldbagge Awards. The jury consisted of Bergman and the CEO of the SFI, and recipients were awarded a bronze plaque depicting Bergman's face as well as a cash prize. The award was first presented at the 14th Guldbagge Awards, and continued until Bergman's death in 2007.

== Archives ==
The Film Historic Collections (Filmhistoriska samlingarna) is one of the oldest of its type in the world, having originated in 1933 and become an independent institution in 1940. The Film Historic Collections became a member of FIAF in 1946, at which time the commercial film industry began to provide some funding to the Collections on the initiative of filmmaker Carl-Anders Dymling, head of Svensk Filmindustri.

The collection was donated to the SFI on 16 March 1964, with the collections remaining at the Tekniska museet. The collection was split into three: the clippings archive, the archival film collections, and documentation.

In 2002, the film archive in Grängesberg was established, to preserve non-theatrical films, and in 2011, this archive was moved from the SFI to the National Library of Sweden.

Also in 2011, www.filmarkivet.se was established: a collaboration between SFI and the National Library, whereby films in the collections are made available to the public as streaming files, at no cost. Filmhistoriska samlingarna continues to digitise hundreds of films, with the 2017 legislation ensuring a permanent funding stream for this.

== Governance ==
The institute is a statutory body governed by the Film Bill. It is managed by a nine-member board appointed by the government, which appoints the CEO. The CEO is responsible for day-to-day operations and management of the institute.

There are five departments within the Swedish Film Institute: Film Funding, Film and Society, Film Heritage, Communications & PR, and Administration.

=== CEOs ===
The longest-serving CEOs of the Institute were founder Harry Schein, who served from 1963 to 1970 and then 1972 to 1978; and Anna Serner, who served from 2011 to 2021. A major legacy left by Serner was the "50/50 by 2020" initiative, which aimed for gender parity in the film industry.

As of April 2024 the CEO is Anna Croneman.

Past and present CEOs include:

- 1963–1970 Harry Schein
- 1970–1972 Bo Jonsson
- 1972–1978 Harry Schein
- 1978–1982 Jörn Donner
- 1982–1989 Klas Olofsson
- 1989–1994 Ingrid Edström
- 1994–1998 Lars Engqvist
- 1998–1999 Hans Ottosson
- 1999–2006 Åse Kleveland
- 2006–2010 Cissi Elwin Frenkel
- 2010–2011 Bengt Toll
- 2011–2021 Anna Serner
- 2021 Mathias Rosengren (acting CEO)
- April 2022 Anette Novak
- September 2023 Åsa Sjöberg (acting CEO)
- April 2024 Anna Croneman

=== Chairs ===
Chairpersons have included:

- 1963–1967 Krister Wickman (1924–93)
- 1967–1970 Roland Pålsson
- 1970–1978 Harry Schein (1924–2006)
- 1978–1981 Per Ahlmark (b. 1939)
- 1981–1984 Bert Levin
- 1984–1992 Hans Löwbeer (1923–2004)
- 1992–1999 Åke Ahrsjö (b. 1929)
- 1999–2005 Lisa Söderberg
- 2005–2011 Håkan Tidlund
- 2012–2014 Göran K Johansson
- 2015–present Claes Ånstrand

== Films ==
Films supported by SFI include:

- The Girl with the Needle (2024)
- The Promised Land (2023)
- Triangle of Sadness (2022)
- I Am Zlatan (2021)
- Margrete: Queen of the North (2021)
- When Darkness Falls (2006)
- The Color of Milk (2004)
- Exit (1990)
- Who Will Comfort Toffle? (1980)

== See also ==
- Trollywood
- Finnish Film Foundation
- American Film Institute
- Association of European Film Archives and Cinematheques
- List of film institutes
