= Through a Glass Darkly (film) =

1961 film by Ingmar Bergman

- Theatrical release poster
- Directed by: Ingmar Bergman
- Written by: Ingmar Bergman
- Produced by: Allan Ekelund
- Starring: Harriet Andersson; Gunnar Björnstrand; Max von Sydow; Lars Passgård
- Cinematography: Sven Nykvist
- Edited by: Ulla Ryghe
- Music by: Johann Sebastian Bach
- Distributed by: Svensk Filmindustri
- Release date: 16 October 1961
- Running time: 90 minutes
- Country: Sweden
- Language: Swedish

Through a Glass Darkly (Swedish: Såsom i en spegel, lit. 'As in a Mirror') is a 1961 Swedish psychological drama film written and directed by Ingmar Bergman, and starring Harriet Andersson, Gunnar Björnstrand, Max von Sydow and Lars Passgård. The film tells the story of a schizophrenic young woman (Andersson) vacationing on a remote island with her husband (von Sydow), novelist father (Björnstrand), and frustrated younger brother (Passgård).

Bergman structured the film as a three-act play, drawing on his personal experiences and relationships. The film was his first of several shot on the island of Fårö, at the recommendation of cinematographer Sven Nykvist. The score incorporates the music of Johann Sebastian Bach. Themes explored include the equation of God with love, exploitation in art, psychosis, and sexuality.

Through a Glass Darkly was released to positive reviews, specifically for Andersson's performance, and won the Academy Award for Best Foreign Language Film. It was followed by Bergman's thematically related 1963 films Winter Light and The Silence.

== Plot ==
The story takes place during a 24-hour period while four family members take their vacation on a remote island, shortly after one of them, Karin (Andersson), is released from an asylum where she has been treated for schizophrenia. Karin's husband Martin (von Sydow), a respected doctor, tells her father David (Björnstrand) that Karin's disease is almost incurable. Meanwhile, Minus (Passgård), Karin's 17-year-old brother, tells Karin that he wishes he could have a real conversation with his father and feels deprived of his father's affection. David is a novelist suffering from "writer's block" who has just returned from a long trip abroad. He announces he will leave again in a month, though he promised he would stay. The others perform a play for him that Minus has written. David, while feigning approval of the play, takes offence since the play can be interpreted as an attack on his character.

That night, after rejecting Martin's erotic overtures, Karin wakes up and follows the sound of a foghorn to the attic. She faints after an episode in which she hears voices behind the peeling wallpaper. She then enters David's room and looks through his desk and finds his diary, seeing his description of her disease as incurable. She discovers his callous desire to record the details of her deterioration. The following morning, David and Martin, while fishing, confront each other over Karin. Martin accuses David of sacrificing his daughter for his art and of being self-absorbed, callous, cowardly, and phony. David is evasive but admits that much of what Martin says is true. David says that he recently tried to kill himself by driving over a cliff but was saved by a faulty transmission. He says that after that, he discovered that he loves Karin, Minus and Martin, and this gives him hope. Meanwhile, Karin tells Minus about her episodes, and that she is waiting for God to appear behind the wallpaper in the attic. Minus is somewhat sexually frustrated, and Karin teases him, even more so after she discovers that he hides a pornographic magazine. Later, on the beach, when Karin sees that a storm is coming, she runs into a wrecked ship and huddles in fear. Minus goes to her and they engage in incestuous sexual activity.

Minus tells the other men about the incident in the ship and Martin calls for an ambulance. Karin asks to speak with her father alone. She confesses her misconduct toward Martin and Minus, saying that a voice told her to act that way and also to search David's desk. She tells David she would like to remain at the hospital, because she cannot go back and forth between two realities but must choose one. While they are packing to go to the hospital, she runs to the attic where Martin and David observe her actions. She says that God is about to walk out of the closet door, and asks her husband to allow her to enjoy the moment. She becomes fixated on a crack in the wall out of which a spider emerges. The ambulance, a helicopter, flies by the window, making a lot of noise and shaking the door open. Karin moves toward the door eagerly but then she runs from it, terrified, and goes into a frenzy of panic. Karin vanishes and, reappearing in a frenzy, is sedated. When she stands, she tells them of God: an evil-faced spider who tried to penetrate her. She looked into God's eyes, and they were "cold and calm," and when God failed to penetrate her he retreated onto the wall. "I have seen God," she announces.

Karin and Martin leave in the helicopter. Minus tells his father that he is afraid, because when Karin had grabbed him in the ship, he began leaving ordinary reality. He asks his father if he can survive that way. David tells him he can if he has "something to hold on to". He tells Minus of his own hope: love. David and his son discuss the concept of love as it relates to God, and they find solace in the idea that their own love may help sustain Karin. Minus is grateful and in awe that he finally had a real conversation with his father, uttering: "Papa spoke to me".

== Cast ==
- Harriet Andersson – Karin
- Gunnar Björnstrand – David
- Max von Sydow – Martin
- Lars Passgård – Minus

== Production ==
=== Development ===
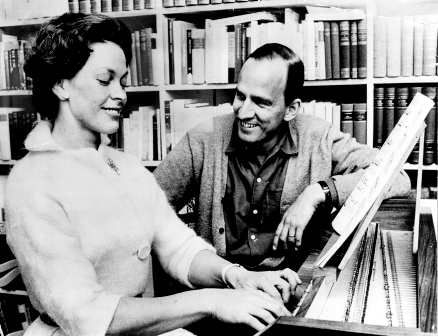
Bergman's relationship with his wife Käbi Laretei influenced the film, which is dedicated to her.

After Ingmar Bergman made notes on his ideas for the film in his diary, drawing on his personal experiences in planning to meet and reconcile with his parents Karin and Erik Bergman, Ingmar wrote the screenplay on the island of Torö in the Stockholm archipelago. He imagined it as a three-act play, where the acts serve as "mirror panels," showing the same thing from different angles. This led to the phrase from the Biblical passage 1 Corinthians 13 being used as the film's title.

Bergman claimed the inspiration for the character of Karin was a woman he had lived with when he was younger. He reported she heard voices telling her to do things. The scene where David describes his attempted suicide is also inspired by Bergman's real-life attempt in Switzerland, before making Smiles of a Summer Night in 1955. Bergman explained that "while I was preparing the film, I became interested in the human drama surrounding another human being who really was in the process of slipping away". He also referred to his screenplay as "a desperate attempt to present a simple philosophy: God is love, and love is God". Bergman later regretted that message as lacking truth, and acknowledged that the optimistic epilogue was "tacked loosely onto the end," causing him to feel "ill at ease" when later confronted with it. He added that "I was touching on a divine concept that is real, but then smeared a diffuse veneer of love all over it."

While working on Through a Glass Darkly, he was adapting The Seagull by Anton Chekhov in the Royal Dramatic Theatre, and borrowed an idea from The Seagull in having Minus write a play. Bergman dedicated the film to his then-wife Käbi Laretei, with influence from what he described as their "complicated, staged relationship".

=== Casting ===
In keeping with his idea of the film being a "chamber play" in the mold of the work of August Strindberg, Bergman referred to his cast as a "string quartet". Bergman sent Andersson the screenplay, with Andersson initially declining, saying the role would be too challenging for her. She said Bergman replied with "Don't give me that load of shit!" To prepare, Andersson contacted a nurse to discuss schizophrenia. At the time, Lars Passgård was a novice actor.

=== Filming ===
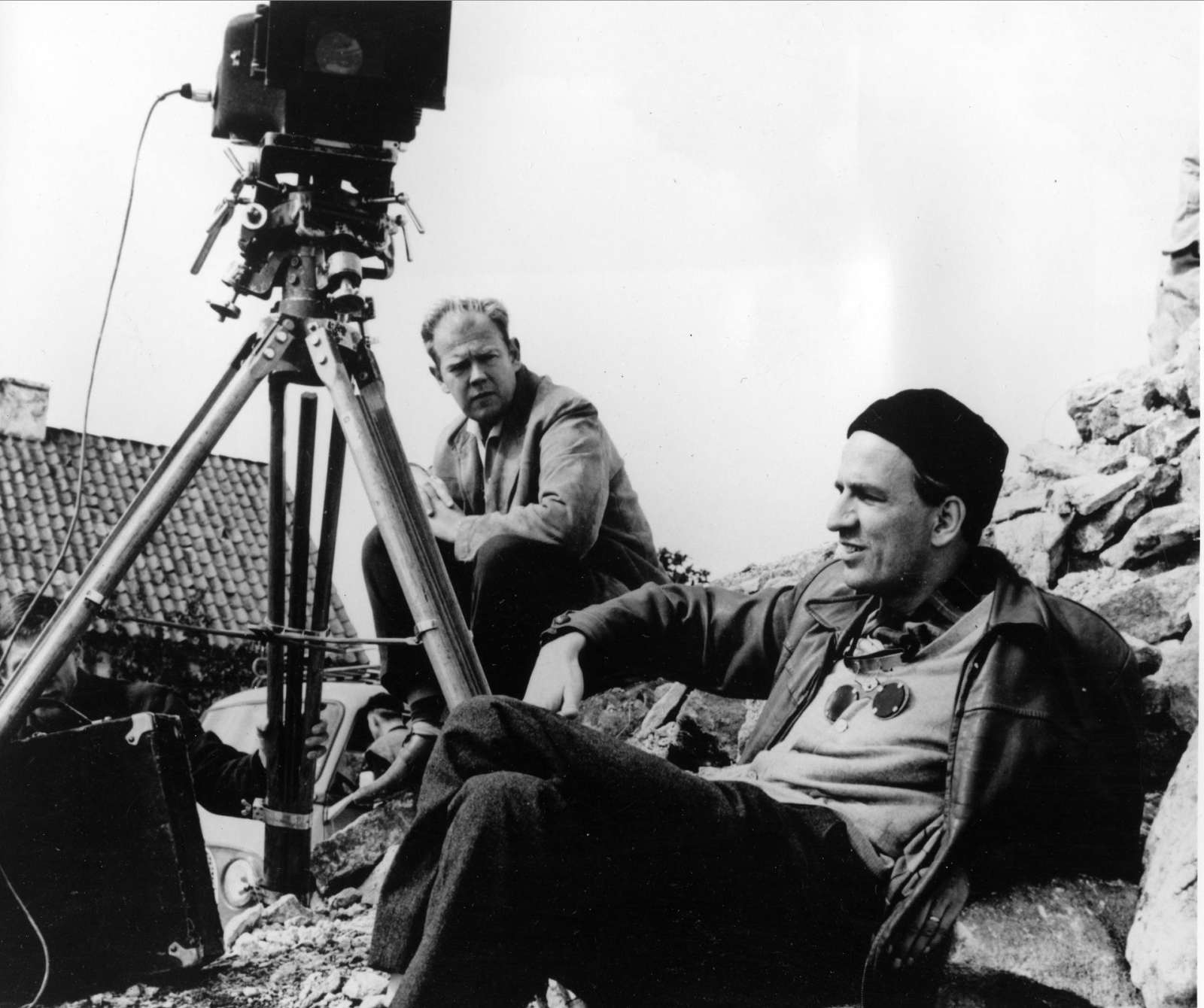
Cinematographer Sven Nykvist and director Ingmar Bergman shooting Through a Glass Darkly.

Through a Glass Darkly was filmed on the island of Fårö, at cinematographer Sven Nykvist's recommendation. It was Bergman's first film shot there, where he would film several more. Nykvist developed his style with the film, employing few camera movements. The director and cinematographer had very serious conversations in which they rethought how lighting should be employed. Nykvist and Bergman also planned to make Through a Glass Darkly as their first colour film collaboration, but were unhappy with the look of the colour shots they tested.

The film relies on natural sounds to convey silence in the characters' lives, with cello music after the incest scene being an exception. Four interpretations of Sarabande from Suite No. 2 in D minor for Cello, BWV 1008 by Johann Sebastian Bach are used in the film, with cellist Erling Blöndal Bengtsson providing all of them.

== Release ==
In Sweden, the film was released by SF Studios on 16 October 1961. The film also screened at the 12th Berlin International Film Festival during June and July 1962.

Janus Films launched the film's U.S. release in New York City on 13 March 1962, delaying it until the finalists for the Academy Award for Best Foreign Language Film were announced. Janus also promoted its Oscar campaign by screening it for Academy members in Los Angeles before voting occurred. On 19 August 2003, The Criterion Collection released the film on DVD in Region 1, along with Begman's films Winter Light and The Silence and Vilgot Sjöman's documentary Ingmar Bergman Makes a Movie. On 20 November 2018, Criterion included a Blu-ray version, along with 38 other Bergman films, in the set Ingmar Bergman's Cinema in Region A.

== Reception ==
=== Critical reception ===
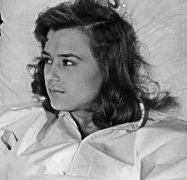
Numerous critics praised the performance of Harriet Andersson.

In Sweden, the film received positive reviews for its characters, minimalist screenplay, and Harriet Andersson's performance. Variety staff described Through a Glass Darkly as "Not a pleasant film, it is a great one". Time's review praised it as "one of the best and certainly the ripest of Ingmar Bergman's creations". In The New York Times, Bosley Crowther called the film "tightly constructed and starkly realistic," and Andersson "beautifully expressive of the haunting awareness, the agony of madness, that move the girl". U.S. critic Brendan Gill called Andersson "well-nigh perfect". U.K. critic Tom Milne wrote that despite a concept suggesting "angst and self-torture," the film is "warm and highly controlled," and Andersson is brilliant. The New Republic critic Stanley Kauffmann, calling it "a Strindbergian study in mental torment," wrote its scenes were "gripping" and Andersson is "stark, beleaguered, volatile". The film ranked 8th on Cahiers du Cinéma's Top 10 Films of the Year List in 1962. In 1996, Through a Glass Darkly was included in Movieline Magazine's "100 Greatest Foreign Films".

Much of the criticism focused on the ending, where the characters appear overly calm despite losing Karin, and God is simply equated with love. In 2008, Roger Ebert added the film to his Great Movies list, impressed by Nykvist's lighting and concluding "we're struck by Bergman's deep concern that humans see the world as through a glass, darkly, and are unable to perceive its meaning". In his 2014 Movie Guide, Leonard Maltin gave the film three and a half stars, describing it as a "Moody, evocative story of insanity". The film has a 100% rating on Rotten Tomatoes, based on 27 reviews, with a weighted average of 9.0/10. Metacritic assigned the film a weighted average score of 84 out of 100, based on 10 critics, indicating "universal acclaim".

=== Awards and honors ===
The film won the 1962 Academy Award for Best Foreign Language Film, marking the second year in a row Bergman had won the award, after The Virgin Spring in 1961. Harriet Andersson attended the ceremony to accept the Academy Award on Bergman's behalf. The film was also in competition for the Golden Bear at the 12th Berlin International Film Festival.

Award	Date of ceremony	Category	Recipient(s)	Result	Ref(s)
Academy Awards	9 April 1962	Best Foreign Language Film	Sweden	Won	
Academy Awards	8 April 1963	Best Original Screenplay	Ingmar Bergman	Nominated	
BAFTA Awards	1963	Best Film	Through a Glass Darkly	Nominated	
BAFTA Awards	1963	Best Foreign Actress	Harriet Andersson	Nominated	
National Board of Review	21 December 1962	Top Foreign Films	Through a Glass Darkly	Won	

== Themes ==
The genre of "family drama" is one analytic approach, with academic Frank Gado referring to Minus as the "consciousness" of this portrayal of family. The tense relationship between the family members is revealed in the meal scene, where David's children are dismayed by his intentions to leave soon after returning to the family, placing a damper on the joy of the occasion. Minus expresses his desire, "I wish I could talk to Papa just once". Minus' play also reveals conflicts. Gado wrote that the story within a story takes place in Saint Teresa's Chapel, with Saint Teresa having used the "interior castle" as a symbol of the soul. While appearing to be "Gothic nonsense", Gado argued that Minus was attempting to tell David that he has always fallen short of greatness as a writer, and that Minus' character uses art to explain his failings in love, in much the same way David retreats to writing to avoid being with Karin. Gado further argued that David's blindfolding before the performance signifies his eyes opening to reality.

The fact that David plans to use Karin's condition as a source for his writing creates a "portrait of the artist as charlatan, windbag, and heartless exploiter", essayist Peter Matthews wrote. In the end, when David shares his thoughts of love as God to Minus, Gado believed Minus is most impressed not by the theory but the "face to face" encounter with his father and the sharing of love, signified in Minus' closing line "Papa spoke to me".

In Karin's relationship with her husband, psychiatrist Barbara Young wrote Karin appears "withdrawn" sexually from Martin, but her sexuality is "still alive in her psychosis". Young observed what she described as a "flirtatious" relationship she has with Minus, and when she hears voices, she "massages her thighs in a sexual way". Her sexuality and knowledge of Minus' sexual frustration is what leads her to incest with Minus, and why they defy the incest taboo, Young wrote. She believed it was this episode of incest that finally led Karin to realize that she "can't live in two worlds".

A reading of 1 Corinthians 13

Karin envisions God as a "spider-god". Bergman's next film, Winter Light explains the metaphor when the character Tomas, played by Björnstrand, relates the spider-god to suffering, as opposed to his previous ideas of a God of love that provides comfort. The story ends with a discussion of how God is love, a question further explored in Winter Light, which asks if understanding God is as simple as that. One Winter Light character mocks the idea of God as love, quoting the end of Through a Glass Darkly exactly. The title Through a Glass Darkly is derived from 1 Corinthians 13, which Gado observed also follows themes of "faith, hope and love".

== Legacy ==
Through a Glass Darkly is sometimes considered the first film in a trilogy that includes Winter Light and The Silence, and focuses on spiritual issues. Bergman writes, "These three films deal with reduction. Through a Glass Darkly – conquered certainty. Winter Light – penetrated certainty. The Silence – God's silence – the negative imprint. Therefore, they constitute a trilogy". He later retracted his claim the films form a trilogy.

Bergman would return to Fårö to shoot several more films, including Persona (1966), Hour of the Wolf (1968), Shame (1968), The Passion of Anna (1969), Fårö Document (1969) and The Touch (1971). Fårö Document is a documentary, while the others use the island for symbolism and have been termed the "island films".

In 2004, producer Andrew Higgie persuaded Bergman to allow a stage version of the work, initially intended for a production by Andrew Upton and Cate Blanchett during their time as Co-Artistic Directors at Sydney Theatre Company. Upton relinquished the project to Jenny Worton, dramaturg of the Almeida Theatre, London, where it was presented in July 2010, starring Ruth Wilson in the lead role of Karin.

== See also ==
- List of films featuring mental illness
- List of submissions to the 34th Academy Awards for Best Foreign Language Film
- List of Swedish submissions for the Academy Award for Best Foreign Language Film
