= Ingmar Bergman Makes a Movie =

- The Criterion Collection's DVD cover for the documentary.
- Directed by: Vilgot Sjöman
- Release date: 27 March 1963
- Running time: 140 minutes
- Country: Sweden
- Language: Swedish

Ingmar Bergman Makes a Movie (Swedish: Ingmar Bergman gör en film) is a 1963 Swedish documentary film directed by Vilgot Sjöman which depicts the making of Ingmar Bergman's film Winter Light from screenwriting to the film's premiere and critical reaction.

The film originally aired in five half-hour episodes on Swedish television. It has subsequently been included in a bonus disc of The Criterion Collection's box set of Bergman's "trilogy," Through a Glass Darkly (1961), Winter Light, and The Silence (1963).

== Production ==
Sjöman was beginning to write screenplays, and wishing to learn about directing, asked Bergman if he could observe him making a film. Sjöman then approached Sveriges Television who were interested in airing a documentary about the process. Shooting of the documentary began after the Winter Light screenplay was finished.

Bergman allowed for Sjöman's crew to film rehearsals, but not the actual shooting. Bergman was also interviewed for the project. The documentary was shot on 16 mm film. After working with Bergman and on the documentary, Sjöman's own films received attention, starting with 491.

== Broadcast ==
The documentary began airing on SVT on 27 January 1963. It was generally not available in Region 1 until The Criterion Collection released it in its Bergman trilogy box set.

No.	Title
1	"The Script"
Sjöman interviews Bergman on the idea and themes of Winter Light, covers the location scouting, and interviews Sven Nykvist on the lighting.
2	"Filming, Part 1"
Sjöman observes actors Gunnar Björnstrand and Ingrid Thulin on set.
3	"Filming, Part 2"
Sjöman interviews Bergman on how the filming process went, shortly before it completed in January 1962.
4	"Postproduction"
Sjöman observes the editing process and interviews Bergman on the anticipated response to the film.
5	"The Premiere"
Sjöman and Bergman review the critical response to the film.

== Reception ==
Writing for Epinions in 2007, scholar Stephen O. Murray called the film "A valuable document of a master craftsman working in top form." He also stated that "Sjöman comes across as very earnest and relatively probing." Brian Burke of DVD Verdict called it the "best documentary I've ever seen on the filmmaking process," adding Bergman appears "candid, relaxed, and animated."

Swedish musicologist Per F. Broman said the documentary has "fascinating insights" into the use of sound in the film. In 2015, Dagens Nyheter referred to the documentary as slightly forgotten, but noted SVT would be rerunning it along with other Bergman-related programming between 25 October and 27 December.
