= The Silence (1963 film) =

1963 Swedish film by Ingmar Bergman

- Danish film poster
- Directed by: Ingmar Bergman
- Written by: Ingmar Bergman
- Produced by: Allan Ekelund
- Starring: Ingrid Thulin; Gunnel Lindblom; Birger Malmsten; Håkan Jahnberg; Jörgen Lindström
- Cinematography: Sven Nykvist
- Edited by: Ulla Ryghe
- Distributed by: Svensk Filmindustri
- Release date: 23 September 1963
- Running time: 105 minutes
- Country: Sweden
- Language: Swedish
- Box office: $350,000 (USA)

The Silence (Swedish: Tystnaden) is a 1963 Swedish drama film written and directed by Ingmar Bergman and starring Ingrid Thulin and Gunnel Lindblom. The plot focuses on two sisters, the younger a sensuous woman with a young son, the elder more intellectually oriented and seriously ill, and their tense relationship as they travel toward home through a fictional Central European country on the brink of war.

The film is the third in a series of thematically related films, following Through a Glass Darkly (1961) and Winter Light (1963), which is sometimes considered a trilogy. In addition to interpretations of spiritual issues, The Silence is sometimes interpreted as presenting its two sister characters as two sides of a single woman, one representing the physical and the other language. Bergman was inspired by his travels around Europe after World War II.

Against expectations of the filmmakers, it was a box-office hit. The film was also noted for its frank depiction of sexuality and won the award for Best Film at the 1st Guldbagge Awards. It is regarded favorably by modern critics. The film was selected as the Swedish entry for the Best Foreign Language Film at the 36th Academy Awards, but was not accepted as a nominee.

== Plot ==
Two emotionally estranged sisters, Ester and Anna, and Anna's son, Johan, a boy of 10, are on a night train journey back home. Ester, the older sister and a literary translator, is seriously ill. Anna coldly assists her, seemingly resenting the burden. They decide to interrupt the journey in the next town called "Timoka", located in a Central European country on the brink of war. Although Ester is a professional translator, neither she nor her relatives speak the language of this country.

The sisters rent a two-room-apartment in a once-grandiose hotel. Ester suffers in her room, self-medicating with vodka and cigarettes while trying to work. Johan soon begins wandering around the hotel's hallways, encountering the elderly hotel porter and a group of Spanish dwarfs who are part of a traveling show. Meanwhile, Anna ventures into the city and is openly advanced upon by a waiter in a cafe. Later, she watches a show in an uncrowded theatre, and is both repelled and fascinated when a young couple begin to have sex in a seat nearby. Anna returns to the cafe, brushes past the waiter, and returns to the hotel in time.

Left with Johan while his mother is out, Ester attempts to form a more intimate bond with him, but Johan avoids her attempts to stroke his hair and face. On Anna's return, Ester is eager for an account of what her sister has done after seeing her soiled dress. Provoked, Anna spitefully fabricates a sexual encounter with the waiter to her sister. Anna also reveals her intention to meet him again that evening, which Ester, not wanting to be left alone, begs her not to do. Anna meets the man in their hotel, and Johan witnesses them kissing and entering a room down an adjacent hall. Upon returning to the room, he asks Ester, why his mother dislikes being with them, as she always departs as soon as she gets the chance. Ester tells him that she has learned a few words of the local language, and she promises to write them down for him. Johan, instinctively knowing Ester is seriously ill, embraces her in a show of concern and compassion.

After Johan has fallen asleep, Ester sobs at the door of Anna and her lover, asking to come in. Anna lets her in and turns on the lights so that Ester can fully see the two of them in bed together. Anna tells Ester that she once aspired to be like her, morally elevated, but realized that her apparent goodness was actually a reflection of Ester's hatred of Anna and all that belonged to her. Ester insists that she loves her and that Anna is wrong. Anna gets furious and asks her to leave the room. On leaving, Ester says "poor Anna", enraging her even more. Anna's lover advances upon her again. Anna is laughing hysterically, but it turns into sobs. The next morning, Anna announces that she and Johan are going to leave the hotel after breakfast. Ester deteriorates while they are gone, having painful spasms of suffocation. She is helped by the elderly porter, who attempts to comfort her. She reveals her fear of death and loneliness but also her loathing for sexual contact. When Johan returns to say good-bye, Ester gives him a note. After he and Anna have boarded the train, Johan reads the title: "To Johan – words in a foreign language". Uninterested, Anna opens the window and cools herself with the outside rain while Johan continues to read the letter.

== Cast ==
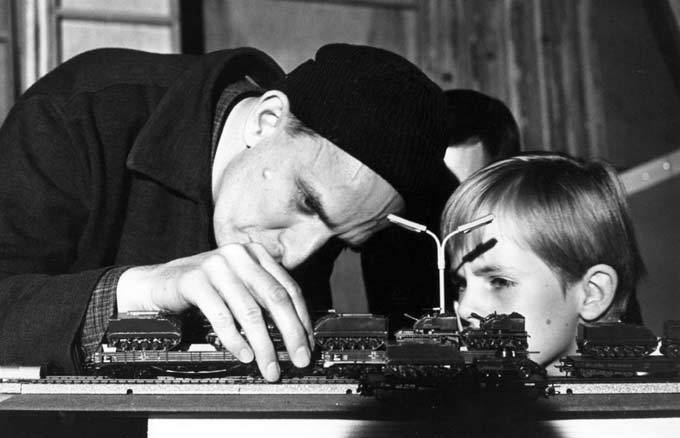
Ingmar Bergman with Jörgen Lindström, who played Johan, on the set of The Silence.

- Ingrid Thulin – Ester
- Gunnel Lindblom – Anna
- Birger Malmsten – The Bartender
- Håkan Jahnberg – The Hotel Waiter
- Jörgen Lindström – Johan
- Eduardo Gutiérrez and The Eduardinis - The little People

== Themes ==
The Silence is sometimes considered the third film in a trilogy that includes Through a Glass Darkly and Winter Light and focuses on spiritual issues. Bergman writes, "These three films deal with reduction. Through a Glass Darkly – conquered certainty. Winter Light – penetrated certainty. The Silence – God's silence – the negative imprint. Therefore, they constitute a trilogy". He later retracted his claim the films form a trilogy.

After Bergman's death, filmmaker Woody Allen theorized in The New York Times that Ester and Anna represent two conflicting sides of a single woman. English Professor Leo Braudy had earlier made the same argument, identifying Anna with the physical, as she is seen bathing and having sex. He saw Ester as representing language, as she translates and writes, is repulsed by sex, has a poor body and only masturbates. Braudy also referenced the possibility that Anna and Ester have an incestuous relationship. The character of Johan represents the one who perceives.

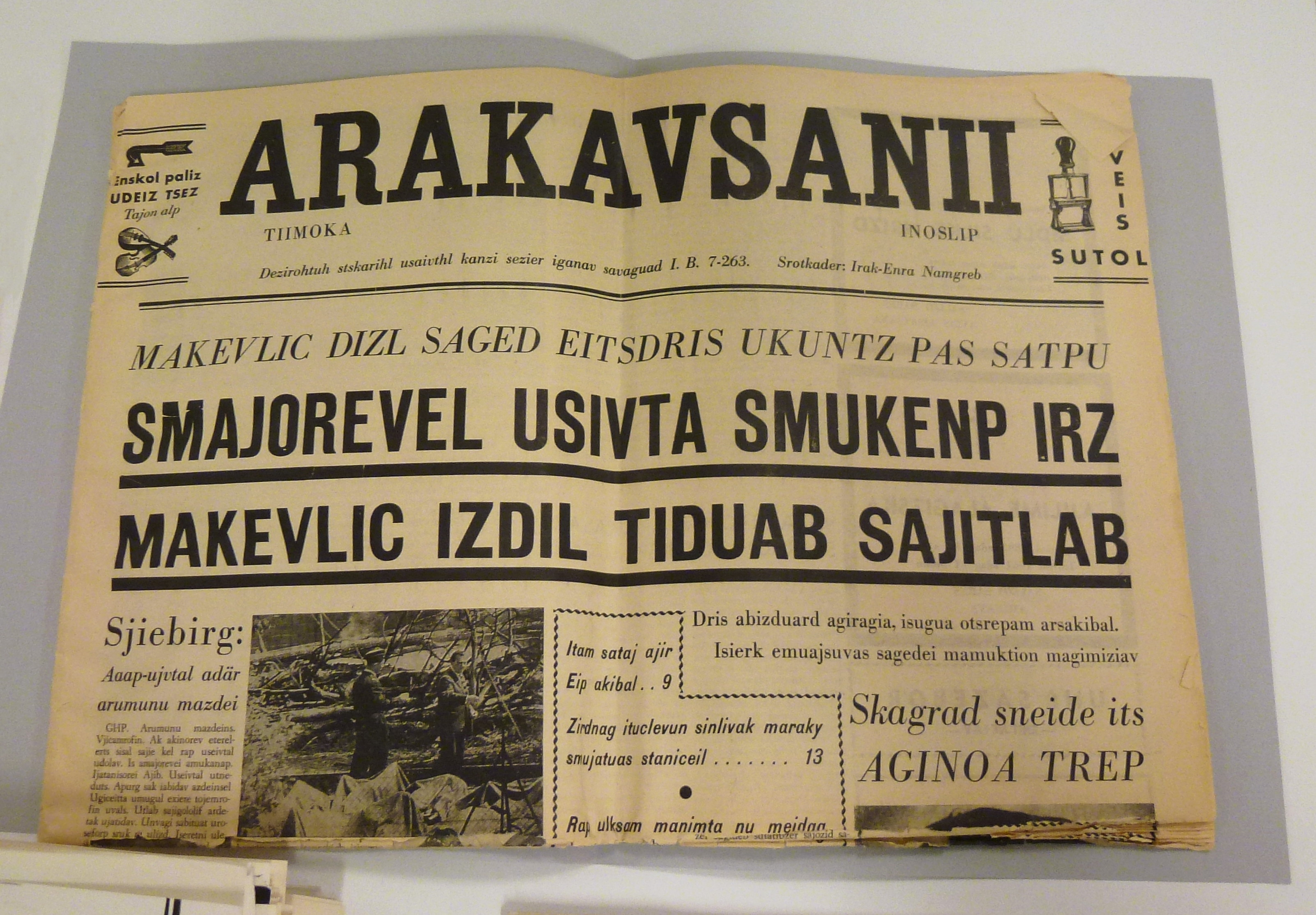
A fictional newspaper in The Silence shows the constructed language of Timoka, which causes a lack of communication between its people and the protagonists.

While Bergman referred to the "Silence" of the title as "God's silence," it can also refer to the lack of communication between the protagonists and the people of Timoka. The sole understanding between the characters is in shared appreciation for the music of Johann Sebastian Bach.

In a scene, Johan stares out of the window as a lone tank rolls down the street at night. In Against Interpretation, Susan Sontag comments, "Again, Ingmar Bergman may have meant the tank rumbling down the street in The Silence as a phallic symbol. But if he did, it was a foolish thought". She then continues to say, "Those who reach for a Freudian interpretation of the tank are only expressing their lack of response to what is there on the screen".

== Production ==
=== Development ===
After World War II, director Ingmar Bergman had visited numerous cities in other countries in Europe. He based the design of The Silence on what he had seen in these travels, in particular in Hamburg, Germany in 1946, after it had been virtually destroyed by Allied bombing attacks. He also recalled he had been inspired by a visit to a hospital, where he had witnessed an obese, elderly man being carried by four nurses. "The image of him being carried away like a dummy stayed in my mind, although I didn't really know exactly why," he recalled.

A throat infection distracted Bergman from developing a story idea for a fairy tale film about a princess and devil, and during recovery he conceived the idea of travelers visiting a foreign city. Initially, the two main characters were supposed to be male. He told Vilgot Sjöman that he converted the characters to female because "he was afraid that the part was too close to himself". While Bergman said he was previously shy about sex in film, he decided on a more explicit approach in this film out of a desire for viewers "to feel, to sense my films".

Working titles of the film included Timoka, The City and God's Silence. According to Gado Timoka is Estonian for "pertaining to the executioner". Bergman developed the constructed language spoken in Timoka. Actually the Estonian word is timuka meaning "executioner's".

=== Filming ===
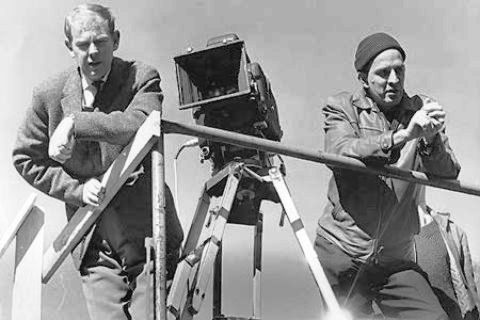
Ingmar Bergman and Sven Nykvist film on the set of The Silence.

Bergman stated he "quietly" instructed Ingrid Thulin and Gunnel Lindblom on the sexual scenes, and that they did not need much convincing to participate in them. He viewed self-confidence as a necessary asset for actors and actresses to have.

The scenes in the streets and theatre were shot on a small budget. Bergman acknowledged these sets could have been more elaborate with more funding, but it may have worked to the story's advantage. Cinematographer Sven Nykvist relied less on theatrical lighting for his shots.

The Goldberg Variations are played by Bergman's wife Käbi Laretei on harpsichord.

== Release ==
The Silence was submitted to the film rating/censorship board (Biografbyrån) of Sweden in July 1963 and went through without any cuts. The general instructions for the work of the board had been modified just weeks before the film reached them, and this contributed to its passage, though Bergman claimed that he was not in any real sense trying to test the limits of what could be allowed in mainstream cinema. He actually did not expect this rather inaccessible film, with sparse and uncommunicative dialogue, to be a big box-office success, and commented in an interview in 1970: "I said to Kenne Fant, CEO of the Swedish Film Institute which had produced the film, 'You might as well realize, this isn't a film that will have people storming the theaters.' Oh the irony; that's exactly what people did".

The original cut, shown in Sweden and certain other countries, includes a number of brief but controversial sex scenes, showing nudity, female masturbation, urination and a couple making out on the seats of a murky cabaret theatre. This plus some strong language led to intense public controversy in Sweden and several other countries at the time. In many countries the film was cut.

According to Jerry Vermilye, The Silence "achieved a measure of sensationalistic attention by dint of its scenes of sensuality, mild though they were. It raised a great deal of controversy in Sweden, and its notoriety continued to raise hackles elsewhere in Europe. All of which attracted the attention of filmgoers; in Britain and the United States it became a considerable hit, perhaps for reasons of prurience rather than art". Due to its reputation for "pornographic sequences" the film became a financial success.

Vermilye is supported by Daniel Ekeroth, who notes in his 2011 book Swedish Sensationsfilms: A Clandestine History of Sex, Thrillers, and Kicker Cinema that "Tystnaden is the production, and marks the exact moment, when sex and nudity became normal in Swedish film. If an internationally acknowledged director like Ingmar Bergman could portray sex in such an explicit way, the last border had been crossed. Hordes of less serious filmmakers immediately abandoned all remaining inhibition about depicting whatever crazed and depraved ideas they thought would attract and scandalize a paying audience".

In the United States, The Silence was distributed by Janus Films, and after edits ran 10 minutes shorter than the Swedish version. The film opened in New York City on 3 February 1964 in two theatres, one of which was known for featuring films with nudity. On 19 August 2003, The Criterion Collection released the film on DVD in Region 1, in a box-set with Bergman's films Through a Glass Darkly and Winter Light and Vilgot Sjöman's documentary Ingmar Bergman Makes a Movie. In 2018, Criterion announced a Blu-ray release in Region A for 20 November 2018, along with 38 other Bergman films, in the set Ingmar Bergman's Cinema.

== Reception ==
=== Box-office ===
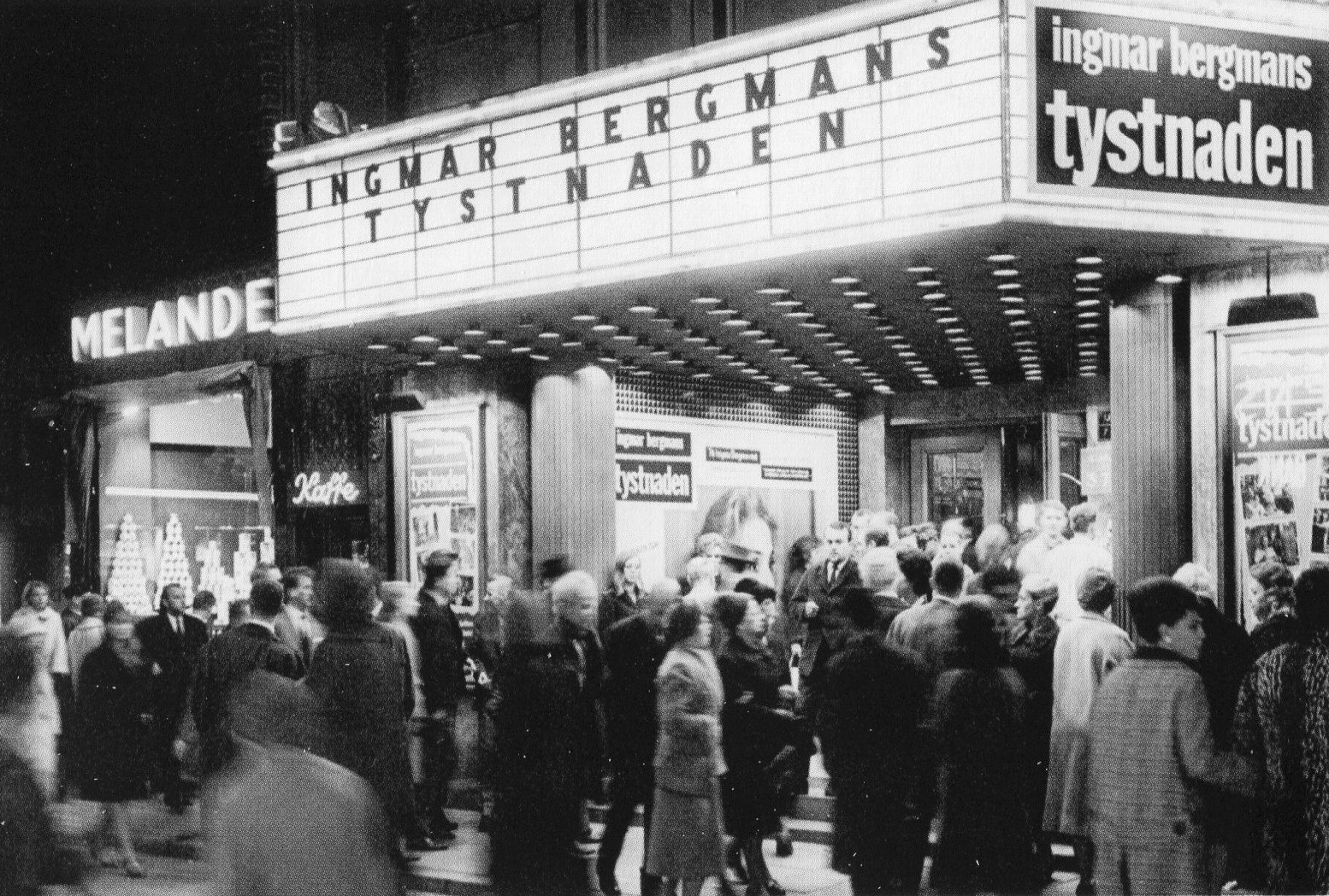
Swedish viewers attend the film's initial release.

During its initial release in Sweden, the film attracted 100,000 viewers per week. The financial success of the film has been described as "resounding".

It was also a success in other territories. Cynthia Grenier wrote that in around 12 countries within months of the initial release, people hoping to buy tickets were "lining up around the block" outside of theatres. In the United States, it grossed $350,000.

=== Critical reception ===
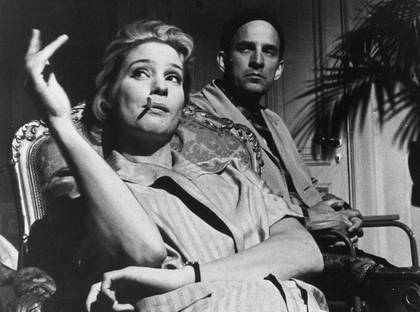
Ingrid Thulin, on the Silence set with Bergman, received positive reviews for her performance and the Guldbagge Award for Best Actress.

The Monthly Film Bulletin's review stated the film was too personal to Bergman, excluding the audience, though the cast and a number of scenes were excellent. Bosley Crowther wrote "Whether this strange amalgam of various states of loneliness and lust articulates a message may be questionable, but it does, at least, resolve into a vaguely affecting experience that moves one like a vagrant symphony". Crowther also credited Ingrid Thulin, Gunnel Lindblom and Jörgen Lindström as "superbly tempered". Richard Brody of The New Yorker praised the film writing "Bergman unfolds grand themes-childhood and its mute sensibility, adulthood and its unhealed emotional wounds-in highly inflected images, which have an anguished intensity unseen since the age of silent films." Rose Pelswick of the New York Journal-American concurred the message was hidden in "Obscurity" but Thulin and Lindblom were "strong". The film ranked 8th on Cahiers du Cinéma’s Top 10 Films of the Year List in 1964.

The film has been classified as a "landmark of modernist cinema" with Alain Resnais' Last Year at Marienbad (1961), Michelangelo Antonioni's L'avventura (1960), and Luis Buñuel's Belle de Jour (1967). Popular film critic Vernon Young (critic) reversed his position on Bergman and admitted in 1971 that The Silence was an "extraordinary achievement in its way...The Silence rewards effort..." Roger Ebert added the film to his Great Movies list in 2008, writing of "a tone of foreboding" and how "there is no theology in The Silence- only a world bereft of it".

On the review aggregator website Rotten Tomatoes, The Silence has an approval rating of 85% based on 20 reviews, with an average score of 8.00/10.

=== Accolades ===
The film was selected as the Swedish entry for the Best Foreign Language Film at the 36th Academy Awards, but was not accepted as a nominee.

Award	Date of ceremony	Category	Recipient(s)	Result	Ref(s)
Guldbagge Awards	25 September 1964	Best Film	Tystnaden	Won	
Guldbagge Awards	25 September 1964	Best Director	Ingmar Bergman	Won	
Guldbagge Awards	25 September 1964	Best Actress	Ingrid Thulin	Won	

== See also ==
- List of submissions to the 36th Academy Awards for Best Foreign Language Film
- List of Swedish submissions for the Academy Award for Best Foreign Language Film
