= Fårö Document =

- Directed by: Ingmar Bergman
- Produced by: Lars-Owe Carlberg
- Cinematography: Sven Nykvist
- Release date: January 1, 1970
- Running time: 57 minutes
- Country: Sweden
- Language: Swedish

Fårö Document (original title: Fårödokument) is a 1970 Swedish documentary film directed by Ingmar Bergman. It was shot on the island of Fårö and is about its inhabitants.

== Subject ==
Speaking in 1969, Bergman identifies Fårö as a small island near Gotland, with a population of 754, down from 1,100 40 years previously; it was merged into the larger Gotland municipality. Erland Wallin, mayor, says in an interview the people of outlying areas outside of urban centres often feel neglected. Bergman draws his conclusion the people of Fårö lack equality compared to others in urban areas: the youth lack a gathering place, schools lack funding, families have no daycare, and interviewee Arvid Andersson is frustrated that his efforts to have a bridge built over Fårö Sound achieve no results. Bergman also called for subsidies for the island's farmers.

== Production ==
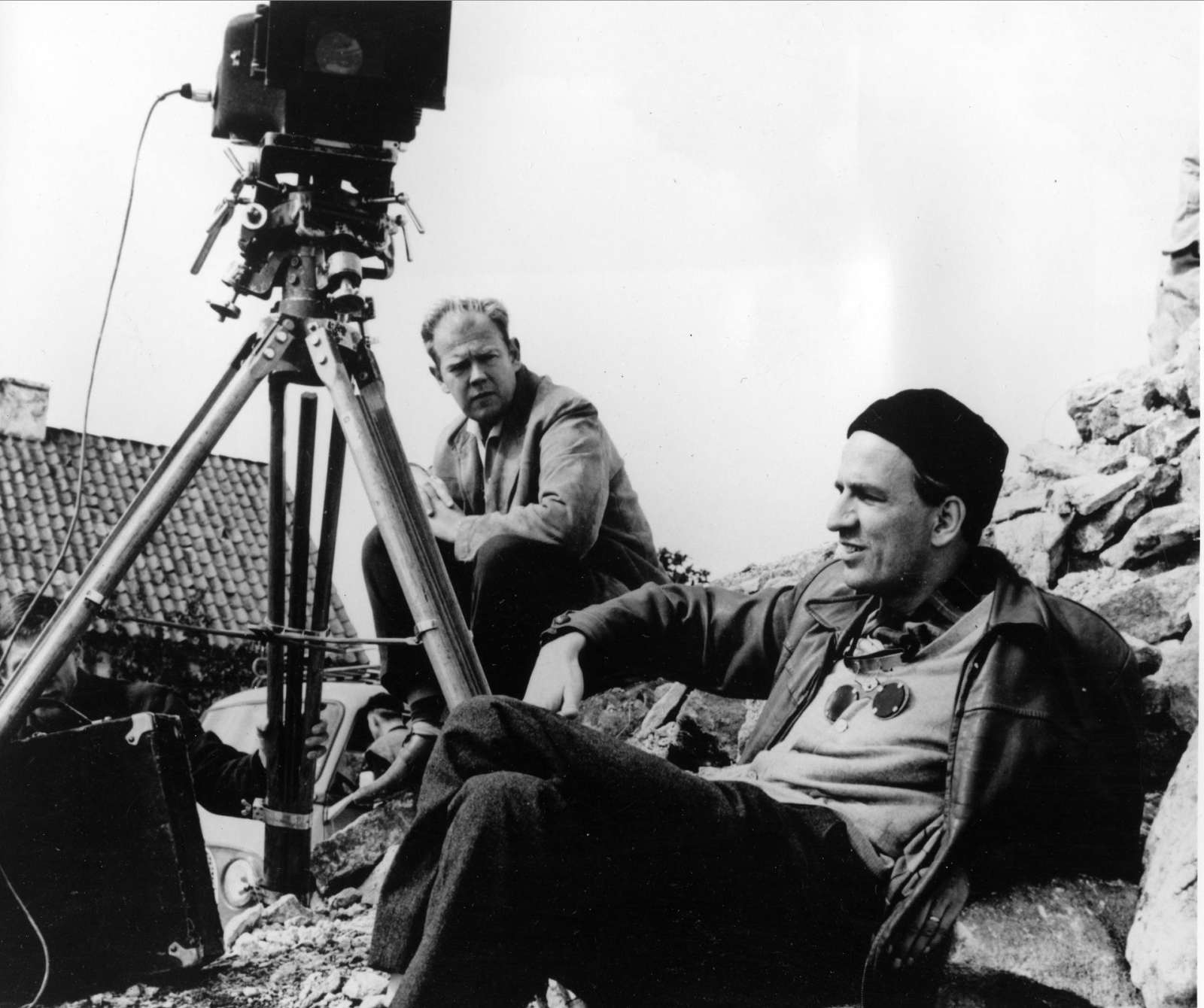
Ingmar Bergman and Sven Nykvist shot on Fårö on numerous occasions.

Bergman shot numerous films on Fårö, including Through a Glass Darkly (1961), Persona (1966), Hour of the Wolf (1968), Shame (1968), The Passion of Anna (1969), and The Touch (1971); however, whereas the others use the island for symbolism and have been termed the "island films", Fårö Document is a documentary. Cinematographer Sven Nykvist shot the documentary on 16 mm film. The Fårö Document production crew consisted of five people and the interviews and photography lasted between 15 March and 1 May 1969.

== Broadcast and release ==
Fårö Document initially aired on Swedish television on 1 January 1970, with approximately three million viewers. Outside Sweden, its availability was limited, but the Paley Center for Media in New York City made the film available with English subtitles.

In 2018, The Criterion Collection released the film on Blu-ray in Region A, along with 38 other Bergman films, in the set Ingmar Bergman's Cinema.

== Sequel ==
A second documentary, Fårö Document 1979, followed in 1979. Bergman shot the follow-up film observing the lives of the locals, including shearing sheep and carrying out other chores. Criterion included a Blu-ray version of the follow-up documentary in Ingmar Bergman's Cinema. At the end of the film, Bergman, in the voiceover narration, implies that there would be a second sequel if he were still alive in ten years' time, but no such sequel ever materialized.
