= Winter Light =

1963 film by Ingmar Bergman

- Theatrical release poster
- Directed by: Ingmar Bergman
- Written by: Ingmar Bergman
- Produced by: Allan Ekelund
- Starring: Ingrid Thulin; Gunnar Björnstrand; Max von Sydow; Gunnel Lindblom
- Cinematography: Sven Nykvist
- Edited by: Ulla Ryghe
- Production company: Svensk Filmindustri
- Distributed by: Svensk Filmindustri
- Release date: 11 February 1963
- Running time: 81 minutes
- Country: Sweden
- Language: Swedish

Winter Light (Swedish: Nattvardsgästerna, lit. 'The Communicants') is a 1963 Swedish tragedy film written and directed by Ingmar Bergman and starring his regulars, Gunnar Björnstrand, Ingrid Thulin, Gunnel Lindblom and Max von Sydow. It follows Tomas Ericsson (Björnstrand), pastor of a small rural Swedish church, as he deals with an existential crisis and his Christianity.

The film is the second in a series of thematically related films, following Through a Glass Darkly (1961) and followed by The Silence (1963); this is sometimes considered a trilogy. In it, Bergman reconsiders Through a Glass Darkly's argument that God is love, and repeated the prior film's reference to God as a monstrous spider.

Bergman formed the story after speaking to a clergyman whose parishioner committed suicide. The film was shot in different locations in Sweden in 1962. Vilgot Sjöman's film Ingmar Bergman Makes a Movie was made simultaneously with Winter Light and documents its production. The feature received positive reviews for its cinematography and themes.

== Plot ==
In the final moments of Pastor Tomas Ericsson's noon service, only a handful of people are in attendance, including fisherman Jonas Persson and his pregnant wife Karin, and Tomas's ex-mistress, the atheistic Märta. After the service, Tomas, though coming down with a cold, prepares for his three o'clock service in another town. Before he leaves, however, the Perssons arrive to speak to him. Jonas has become morose after hearing that China is developing an atomic bomb. Tomas speaks to the man briefly, but asks Jonas to return after taking his wife home. No sooner have the Perssons left than a substitute teacher Märta enters, and she attempts to comfort the miserable Tomas, and asks if he's read the letter she wrote to him. He has not, and tells her of his failure to help Jonas, and wonders if he will have anything to say, since he is without hope as well. Märta states her love for Tomas, but also her belief that he does not love her. She leaves, and Tomas reads her letter.

In the letter, Märta describes Tomas's neglect of her, relating a story of how a rash that disfigured her body repulsed him, and neither his faith nor his prayers did anything to help her. She writes of how her family was warm and loving without religion, and expresses bewilderment at his indifference to Jesus. Tomas finishes the letter, and falls asleep. Awakened by the return of Jonas, Tomas clumsily tries to provide counsel, before finally admitting that he has no faith as well. He says his faith was an egotistical one – God loved humanity, but Tomas most of all. Serving in Lisbon during the Spanish Civil War, Tomas could not reconcile his loving God with the atrocities being committed, so he ignored them. Tomas finally tells Jonas that things make more sense if we deny the existence of God, because then man's cruelty needs no explanation. Jonas leaves, and Tomas faces the crucifix and declares himself finally free.

Märta, who has been lurking in the chapel, is overjoyed to hear this, and embraces Tomas, who again does not respond to her affections. They are interrupted by the widow Magdalena, who tells them that Jonas has just committed suicide with a rifle. Tomas drives, alone, to the scene, and stoically helps the police cover Jonas's body with a tarp. Märta arrives on foot, and she and Tomas drive off to her home, where she invites him in to take some medicine for his cold. Waiting in Märta's classroom attached to her house, Tomas finally lashes out at her, telling her first that he rejected her because he was tired of the gossip about them. When that fails to deter her affections, Tomas then tells her that he was tired of her problems, her attempts to care for him, and her constant talking, and that Märta could never measure up to his late wife, the only woman he has ever loved. Though shocked by the attack, Märta agrees to drive with him to the Persson house. Informed of Jonas's suicide, Karin collapses onto the stairs and wonders how she and her children will go on. Tomas makes a perfunctory offer of help, and leaves.

Arriving for the three o'clock service at the second church, Tomas and Märta find the building empty except for Algot, the handicapped sexton, and Fredrik, the organist. In the vestry, Algot questions Tomas about the Passion. Algot wonders why so much emphasis was placed on the physical suffering of Jesus, which was brief in comparison to the many betrayals he faced from his disciples, who denied his messages and commands, and finally from God, who did not answer him on the cross. He asks, "Wasn't God's silence worse?" Tomas, who has been listening silently, answers yes. Meanwhile, Fredrik tells Märta that she should leave the small town and Tomas and live her life, rather than stay and have her dreams crushed like the rest of them, but she chooses to start praying. Fredrik and Algot wonder if they should have a service since no one has shown up. Tomas still chooses to hold it, and the bells are rung. He begins the service reciting the Sanctus: "Holy Holy Holy, Lord God Almighty; heaven and earth are full of your glory."

== Cast ==
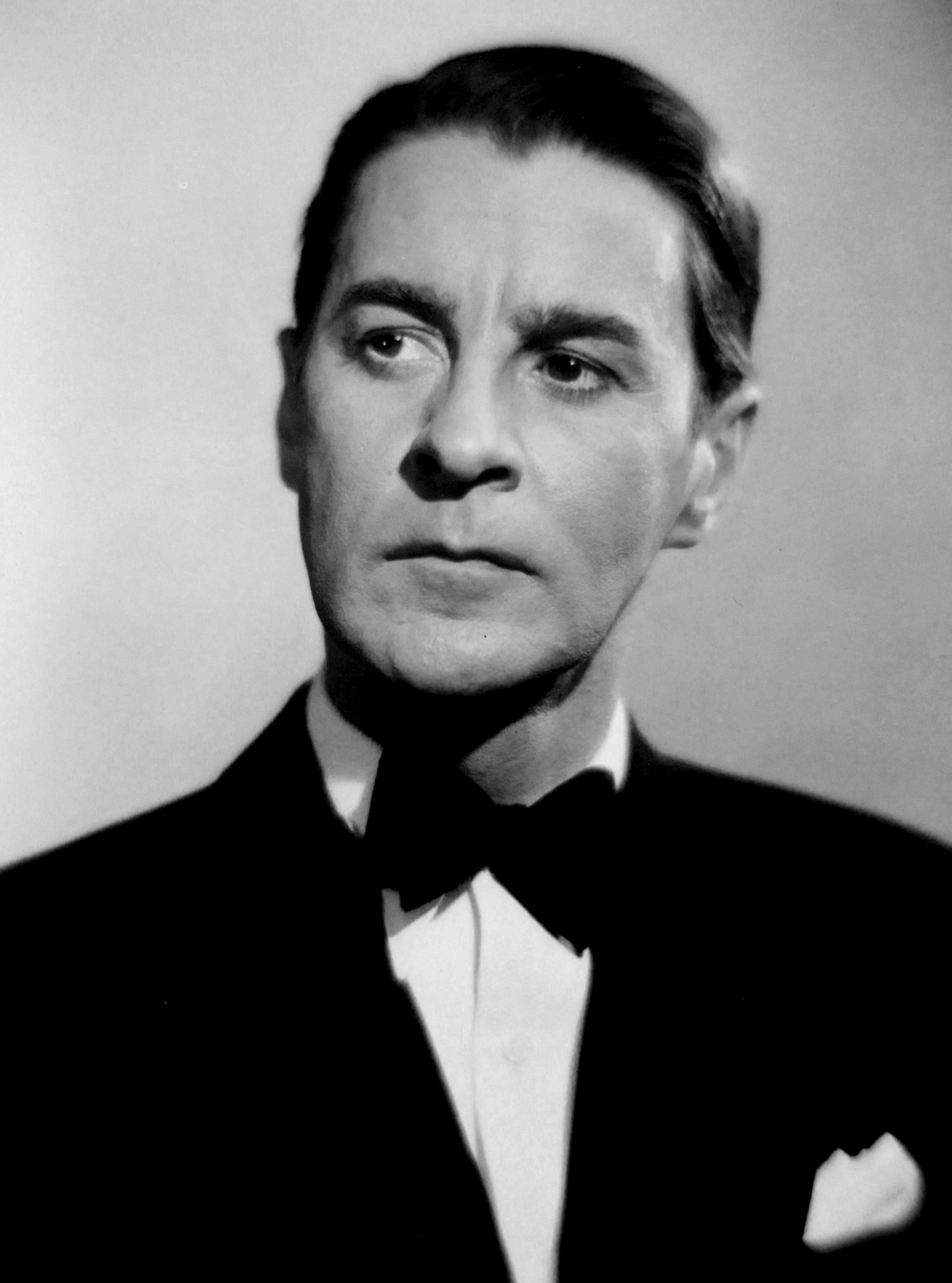
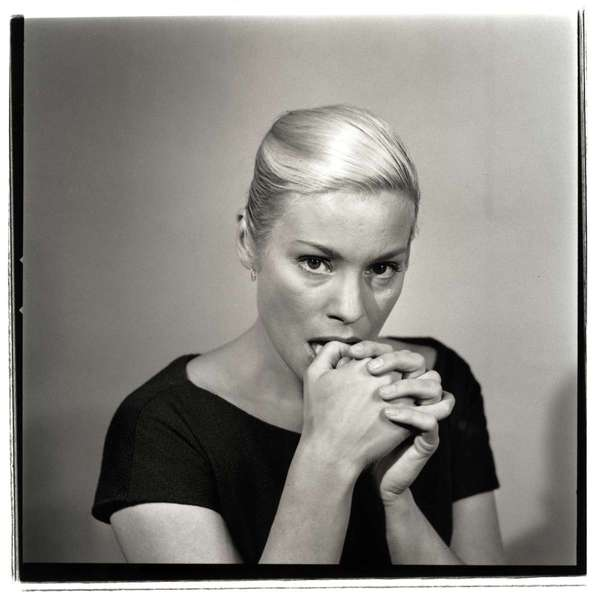
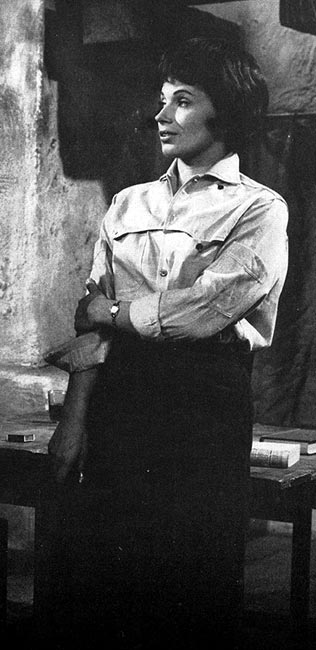
Gunnar Björnstrand, Ingrid Thulin and Gunnel Lindblom have starring roles.
- Gunnar Björnstrand – Tomas Ericsson, pastor
- Ingrid Thulin – Märta Lundberg, schoolteacher
- Gunnel Lindblom – Karin Persson
- Max von Sydow – Jonas Persson
- Allan Edwall – Algot Frövik, sexton
- Kolbjörn Knudsen – Knut Aronsson, warden
- Olof Thunberg – Fredrik Blom, organist
- Elsa Ebbesen – Magdalena Ledfors, widow

== Themes ==
Ingmar Bergman identified previous films he had made with similar themes as The Virgin Spring (1960) and Through a Glass Darkly (1961). Winter Light is often considered the second film in a trilogy, following Through a Glass Darkly and completed by The Silence. All three films focus on spiritual issues. Bergman writes, "These three films deal with reduction. Through a Glass Darkly – conquered certainty. Winter Light – penetrated certainty. The Silence – God's silence – the negative imprint. Therefore, they constitute a trilogy". He later retracted his claim the films form a trilogy.

With Through a Glass Darkly ending with a discussion of how God is love, Winter Light further examines if understanding God is as simple as that. Bergman stated he abandoned the idea that love is proof of God because it was unsatisfactory to explain to a character who was suicidal over fear of nuclear war. The character Blom mocks the idea of God as love, attributing the words to Tomas but quoting the end of Through a Glass Darkly exactly. Tomas's loss of his wife, and his loss of his ability to love, is further proof to him that God has become silent. In contrast, the character Algot, presented as enlightened, equates Tomas's spiritual crisis with sayings of Jesus on the cross and God's "silence".

Like Through a Glass Darkly, Winter Light describes God as a "spider-god", with Winter Light explaining the metaphor when Tomas relates the spider-god to suffering, as opposed to his previous ideas of a God of love that provides comfort. The ending may mean Tomas has decided God does not exist, or that Tomas learns he must keep his faith because all Christians, including Jesus, grapple with God's silence. In Bergman's view, Winter Light represents the end of his study on whether God exists, after which human love became his main concern.

== Production ==
=== Development ===
Director and screenwriter Ingmar Bergman was inspired to make the film after talking to a clergyman, who related how he had offered spiritual advice to a fisherman who later killed himself. To this, Bergman added the ideas of the clergyman struggling with his faith and a relationship outside marriage. The idea of the character becoming depressed over fear of China and weapons of mass destruction was based on an article Bergman himself had read, and he acknowledged it reflected his own dread. Bergman also cited Robert Bresson's Diary of a Country Priest as an influence on the film.

Bergman attempted to structure the screenplay as chamber music, in three acts. It is meant, in part, as criticism of the governance of the Church of Sweden, which Bergman felt was condemning itself by failing to keep what is important. He completed the screenplay on 11 August 1961, at which point Vilgot Sjöman began filming the documentary Ingmar Bergman Makes a Movie chronicling the production.

With this film, Bergman took the rare step of sharing the screenplay with his father, Church of Sweden minister Erik Bergman, and boasted that his father read it three times. Ingmar may have been trying to communicate to his father that he understood Erik, but the name of the character, Ericsson (son of Erik), may indicate the character represents Ingmar more than Erik.

=== Casting ===
Ingmar Bergman personally cast some of the roles himself. Actor Gunnar Björnstrand, who played Tomas, typically acted in more comedic roles, and found it challenging to play a character who was in some ways unlikable. This led him to forget some of his lines, which Bergman said he had never seen Björnstrand do before. However, Björnstrand told Sjöman he personally liked the character because of his relatability.

Allan Edwall played Algot, a character with the same form of rheumatism as prop artist K.A. Bergman. In Ingmar Bergman Makes a Movie, K.A. Bergman identifies his illness as Bekterev's disease (ankylosing spondylitis). As a result, K.A. Bergman supervised Edwall's performance.

=== Filming ===
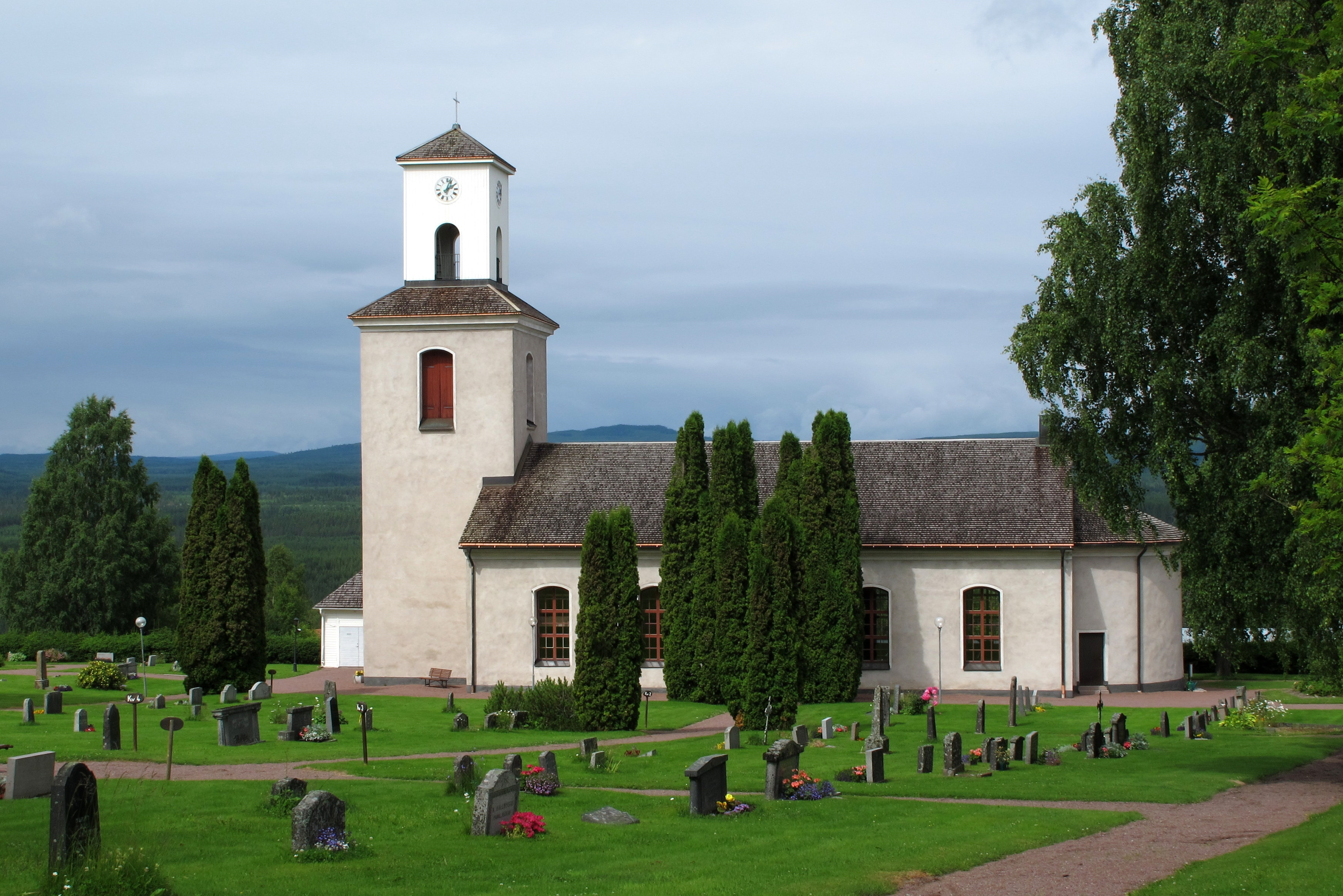
Skattunge kyrka was a filming location.

The film was shot between 4 October 1961 and 17 January 1962 in the Filmstaden studios, Skattunge kyrka and Rättvik. The crew was unable to shoot inside the real Skattunge kyrka church, so they built a set for interiors. Although most film sets have no roofs, the crew built a roof over the church set it constructed. K.A. Bergman brought in hymn boards, which were centuries old, from real churches in Forsbacka and Lillkyrka.

Cinematographer Sven Nykvist spent one month studying lighting in the church at different times of day and in different conditions, conducting photography tests. Nykvist's lighting was used directly from low perspectives in his shots. To reduce the shadows as much as possible, Nykist had reflectors and screens built to also indirectly light scenes.

Although the clothing is ordinary, costume designer Max Goldstein had the actors try out many articles of clothing to determine what looked best, and Ingmar Bergman did not review his sketches.

The film employs no score aside from the organ music. Bergman planned to use Sarabande from Suite No. 2 in D minor for Cello, BWV 1008 by Johann Sebastian Bach for the scene where Tomas and Märta leave the scene of Jonas's suicide, tying in with the use of the piece in Through a Glass Darkly, but Bergman eventually abandoned the idea as "contrived".

Bergman judged the speed of filming to be slower than his average film, because of struggles to master the right emotions, though scenes did not require an unusually high number of takes. The scene where Märta first comforts Tomas took 11 takes.

== Release ==
The film opened in Sweden on 11 February 1963. Vilgot Sjöman's interviews with audience members at the Swedish premiere indicated viewers thought it was a masterpiece, that the performances were realistic, and Bergman's struggles with faith were relevant to everyone.

In the United States, Winter Light opened in New York City on 13 May 1963, distributed by Janus Films. On 19 August 2003, The Criterion Collection released the film on DVD in Region 1, in a boxset with Through a Glass Darkly, The Silence and Sjöman's documentary Ingmar Bergman Makes a Movie. In 2018, Criterion announced a Blu-ray release in Region A for 20 November 2018, along with 38 other Bergman films, in the set Ingmar Bergman's Cinema.

== Reception ==
Winter Light drew ambivalent responses in the American press. In Variety, it was billed as "an extremely moving and fascinating film for the religiously aware, and a somewhat boring one for the religiously indifferent". Judith Crist of the New York Herald Tribune wrote that the work "casts a gloom-tinged glare upon the human condition with chilling clarity", but found the film "bleak and cold in its abstract ideas". John Simon described it as "inferior Bergman" in The New Leader, but wrote that it still "deserves to be seen". In The New York Times, Bosley Crowther called it "a thoughtful, engrossing, shocking film". The National Board of Review named it one of the Top Foreign Films in its 1963 Awards. The film ranked 3rd on Cahiers du Cinéma's Top 10 Films of the Year List in 1965.

Susan Sontag, in her famous essay "Against Interpretation" first published in December 1964 in the Evergreen Review, dismissed the "callow pseudo-intellectuality of the story and some of the dialogue" in Winter Light, but praised "the beauty and visual sophistication of the images".

In 2007, Roger Ebert added Winter Light to his Great Movies list, citing the film's "bleak, courageous power" and echoing Sontag's praise of its visual style as "one of rigorous simplicity". In his 2015 Movie Guide, Leonard Maltin gave the film three and a half stars, calling it a "Powerful, penetrating drama". Bergman cited Winter Light as his favorite among his films. The film has a 74% rating on Rotten Tomatoes, based on 23 reviews.

In September 2025, Winter Light was listed as part of the Swedish cultural canon, intended to create a shared cultural identity for Swedish citizens and new arrivals to the country.
