= Flight North =

1986 film

- Directed by: Ingemo Engström
- Written by: Klaus Mann (novel: Journey into Freedom); Ingemo Engström (screenplay)
- Produced by: Ingemo Engström
- Starring: Katharina Thalbach
- Cinematography: Axel Block
- Edited by: Thomas Balkenhol
- Release date: February 1986
- Running time: 117 minutes
- Countries: West Germany; Finland
- Language: Finnish

Flight North (German: Flucht in den Norden, Finnish: Pako pohjoiseen) is a 1986 West German-Finnish drama film directed by Ingemo Engström. It was entered into the 36th Berlin International Film Festival.

== Premise ==
A film adaptation of Klaus Mann's novel follows a woman's escape from Nazi Germany to Finland in search of safety and freedom.

== Cast ==
- Katharina Thalbach as Johanna
- Jukka-Pekka Palo as Ragnar
- Lena Olin as Karin
- Tom Pöysti as Jens
- Britta Pohland as Suse
- Käbi Laretei as Mother
