= All These Women =

1964 film by Ingmar Bergman

- Theatrical release poster
- Directed by: Ingmar Bergman
- Written by: Ingmar Bergman; Erland Josephson
- Produced by: Allan Ekelund
- Starring: Bibi Andersson; Harriet Andersson; Eva Dahlbeck
- Cinematography: Sven Nykvist
- Edited by: Ulla Ryghe
- Music by: Erik Nordgren
- Color process: Technicolor
- Distributed by: Svensk Filmindustri
- Release date: 15 June 1964
- Running time: 80 minutes
- Country: Sweden
- Language: Swedish

All These Women (Swedish: För att inte tala om alla dessa kvinnor), originally released as Now About These Women in the UK, is a 1964 Swedish comedy film written and directed by Ingmar Bergman. It is a parody of Federico Fellini's 8½. Along with Smiles of a Summer Night, the film is one of the few comedy films ever made by Bergman. It was Bergman's first film to be shot in color.

== Plot ==
Cornelius is a musical critic who visits the summer estate, Villa Tremolo, of the famed cellist, Felix, to write the musician's biography. Cornelius is greeted by Jillker, Felix's impresario, and Tristan, the chauffeur, but Felix remains chiefly unseen. Cornelius glimpses Felix heading for a bedroom with a woman whom he presumes to be Felix's wife. Cornelius meets Adelaide and tells her Felix has retired with his wife, but Adelaide reveals she is Felix's wife. It turns out Felix is unfaithful and has several lovers. Aside from Adelaide, each is given a special nickname. The self-proclaimed "official" mistress is Ms. Bumblebee, who meets and has sex with Cornelius.

While Cornelius is in bed with Ms. Bumblebee, a woman enters the room with a pistol and fires several shots. No one is harmed, but Cornelius believes the shots were meant for Felix. Cornelius becomes concerned that someone is trying to murder Felix and tells Jillker, who is unconcerned, saying that everyone must die. Cornelius remains unable to meet with Felix and finds it difficult to write a biography without an interview. He tells Adelaide that though the threat of murder might add interest to the biography, he hoped Felix's safety would be guarded.

Jillker, citing Felix's total moral decline, resigns as his impresario. Felix emerges to perform in front of his lovers and Cornelius. During the performance, a woman takes out a pistol. However, Felix collapses, dead, during his performance without any shots fired.

Four days after Cornelius's arrival at Villa Tremolo, the lovers, one by one, look over Felix in his coffin, each one remarking on how he looks the same, yet different.

== Cast ==
- Bibi Andersson – Humlan (Bumblebee)
- Harriet Andersson – Isolde
- Eva Dahlbeck – Adelaide
- Karin Kavli – Madame Tussaud
- Gertrud Fridh – Traviata
- Mona Malm – Cecilia
- Barbro Hiort af Ornäs – Beatrica
- Allan Edwall – Jillker
- Georg Funkquist – Tristan
- Carl Billquist – The young man
- Jarl Kulle – Cornelius

== Release and reception ==
The film ranked 9th on Cahiers du Cinéma's Top 10 Films of the Year List in 1964. In 2018, The Criterion Collection released the film on Blu-ray in Region A, along with 38 other Bergman films, in the set Ingmar Bergman's Cinema. In 2022 it was included in the third of the BFI four volume chronological set of Bergman’s career. Critic Roger Ebert wrote that All These Women was "the worst film he [Bergman] has ever made." Stanley Kauffmann of The New Republic wrote "All These Women is intended to be hilarious, but the gift of splitting sides is not in him [Bergman]".
