= Skattunge Church =

Skattunge kyrka
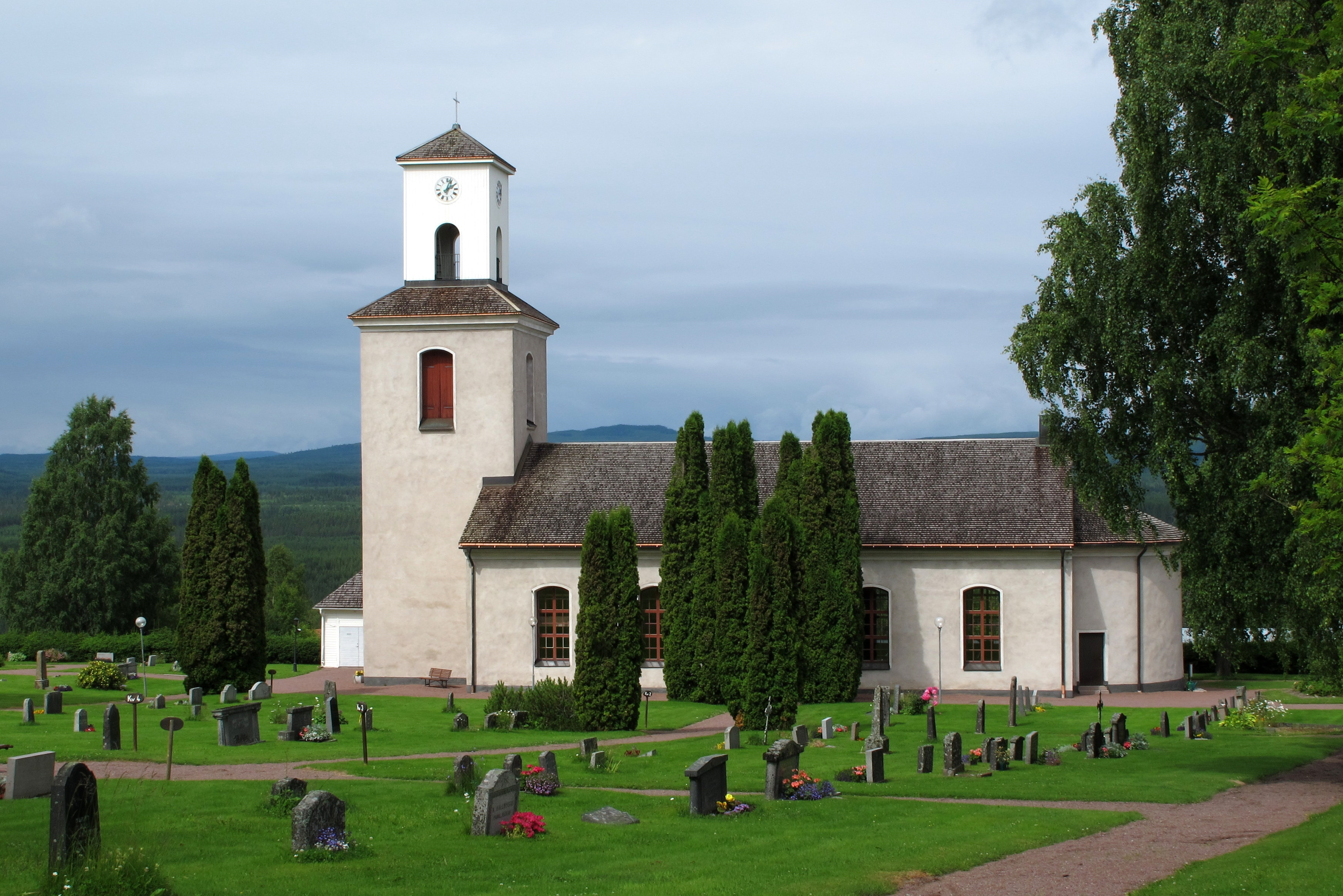
- Skattunge kyrka
- 61°11′10.25″N 14°50′13.7″E
- Location: Skattungbyn, Orsa, Dalarna County
- Country: Sweden
- Denomination: Church of Sweden
- Website: www.svenskakyrkan.se/orsa/skattungekyrka

History
- Status: Active

Architecture
- Functional status: Church
- Completed: 1839

Specifications
- Length: 33 m (108 ft 3 in)
- Width: 14 m (45 ft 11 in)

Administration
- Diocese: Västerås
- Parish: Orsa

Clergy
- Bishop: Mikael Mogren

Skattunge Church, better known as Skattunge kyrka, is a church building in Skattungbyn, Orsa, Sweden in the Diocese of Västerås.

== History ==
The original Skattunge church was a wooden chapel built in the 1600s. The chapel was eleven meters long and eight meters wide. In the 1800s the chapel fell into disrepair and had to be replaced. A new stone church was built in its place. During construction of the present church, the old chapel served as scaffolding. In 1839 the church was completed and the old wooden chapel was demolished. Construction of the church was made possible thanks to donations of a number of parishioners. The church dimensions are 33 meters x 14 meters and a tower height of 22 meters. Over the years, several repairs were carried out.

The most extensive restoration took place in 1961 - 1962 when the exterior walls were given new plaster and the tower was restored to its original state. New pews were inserted and fitted with doors in the style benches from the 1840s. The old altar, that was set aside in the 1920s, was reinstated once more. In 1963 a new organ, the third one that was replaced, was installed in the church. It was built by Lindegrens Orgelbyggeri in Gothenburg.

== Nattvardsgästerna ==
The church was used as one of the filming locations for one of Ingmar Bergman's movies, Winter Light or Nattvardsgästerna in Swedish, in 1963.
