= From the Life of the Marionettes =

1980 West German film by Ingmar Bergman

- Written by: Ingmar Bergman
- Directed by: Ingmar Bergman
- Starring: Robert Atzorn; Heinz Bennent; Martin Benrath; Toni Berger; Christine Buchegger
- Music by: Rolf A. Wilhelm
- Countries of origin: West Germany; Sweden
- Original language: German

Production
- Producers: Konrad Wendlandt; Horst Wendlandt; Ingmar Bergman
- Cinematography: Sven Nykvist
- Editor: Petra von Oelffen
- Running time: 101 minutes

Original release
- Release: 3 November 1980

From the Life of the Marionettes (German: Aus dem Leben der Marionetten) is a 1980 television film directed by Ingmar Bergman. The film was produced in West Germany with a German-language screenplay and soundtrack while Bergman was in "tax exile" from his native Sweden. It is filmed in black and white apart from two colour sequences at the beginning and end of the film.

Set in Munich, the film charts the disintegration of the relationship of Katarina and Peter Egermann, based on the unhappy couple of the same names briefly featured in Bergman's 1973 miniseries Scenes from a Marriage. In a reimagining of the characters, Peter and Katarina's unhappiness and unfaithfulness culminates in Peter's murder of a prostitute.

== Plot ==
Peter Egermann visits and murders a prostitute named Ka, committing an act of necrophilia. The coroner interrogates Peter's friends for an explanation. Mogens Jensen, a psychiatrist, tells the coroner he is shocked by the murder, claiming there were no signs this could happen. Peter is married to career woman Katarina; they have no children.

Twenty days earlier, Peter confides in Jensen that he was plagued with homicidal thoughts, primarily aimed against Katarina. Jensen considers the thoughts likely not serious, but advised Katarina to leave town. Katarina dismisses the warning as preposterous, and given it was a busy season for work, she decided it was impossible for her to leave. She also dismisses Mogens' sexual advances towards her.

Five days before the murder, after a sleepless night, the couple gets up in the middle of the night and drinks alcohol. Peter at his workplace dictates a business deal at his office. Four days before, Katarina skips a meal with her mother in law and goes to the house of Tim, a gay man. He is a business partner of Katarina and her friend, and by extension, he also knew Peter. He entertains her with philosophical discussions and she rewards him by gifting him a scarf originally meant for Peter.

The interrogator questions Tim. The interrogator asks if Tim ever had an affair with Peter; Tim hesitates before replying no. Agitated, Tim reveals he had desires for Peter, and is suffering a guilty conscience after having introduced Peter to Ka. Ka was one of Tim's friends. Tim blames his homosexuality for bringing Peter and Ka together, saying he had difficulties with Katarina and liked the idea that Peter would cheat on her with a prostitute. Slowly, he thought, he would lure Peter to him.

Two days before the murder, Peter stands on a high balcony and nearly throws himself from the building, and Katarina calls a friend to calm him down. Peter comes back inside, where he quarrels with Katarina. The two claim that they share an open relationship, as Katarina seeks other lovers. Peter claims he is the one who knows how to sexually satisfy Katarina. Katarina responds she sometimes had orgasms with Peter, but also that she sometimes faked them and left the bedroom to masturbate, and that on other occasions she only had small convulsions.

The night of the murder, Peter meets Ka at a Munich peep show. Ka told Peter her real name was Katarina, the same as his wife. She takes him to her residence and locks all the doors. She pleads with him to take off his coat.

Jensen concludes that Peter, having grown up under an aggressive mother and then lived with a similarly aggressive wife, was unaware of his own latent homosexuality and that meeting Ka disrupted Peter's daily routine and triggered an emotional blackout. Peter is confined to a mental institution, where he cradles a teddy bear at night.

== Cast ==
- Robert Atzorn – Peter Egermann
- Heinz Bennent – Arthur Brenner
- Martin Benrath – Mogens Jensen
- Toni Berger – The Guard
- Christine Buchegger – Katarina Egermann
- Gaby Dohm – Secretary
- Erwin Faber
- Lola Müthel – Cordelia Egermann
- Ruth Olafs – Nurse
- Karl-Heinz Pelser – The Interrogator
- Rita Russek – Ka / Katarina Krafft
- Walter Schmidinger – Tim
- Michel Wagner - The Bartender

== Production ==
=== Development ===
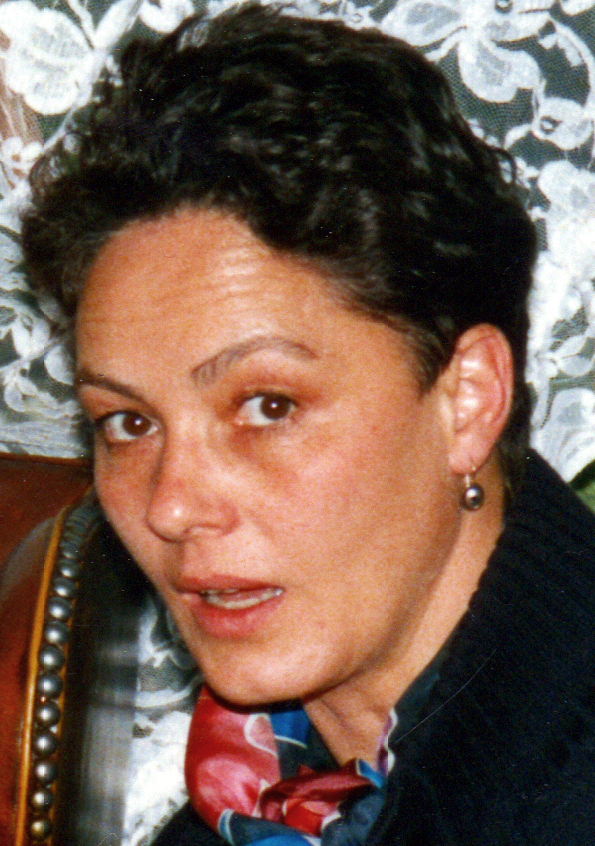
Christine Buchegger starred as Katarina Egermann. All of the cast was drawn from the Residenztheater.

Ingmar Bergman wrote From the Life of the Marionettes after being arrested in Stockholm in 1976 and subsequently leaving for West Germany. He stated:

I found myself in a difficult situation, far away from my homeland where I did not want to return. I had already tried to express my pain and suffering in The Serpent's Egg, but without succeeding ... But in From the Life of the Marionettes I found a way, a form, a very definite and distinct form to which I could transfer my pain, my anguish and all my difficulties and reshape them into something concrete.

He based the lead characters after Peter and Katarina in his 1973 miniseries Scenes from a Marriage. Bergman's initial conception for the project was titled Love for No Lovers, but in the rewrite culminating in From the Life of the Marionettes Peter and Katarina were reimagined as a German couple distinct from the Swedish characters in Scenes from a Marriage. Bergman explained the final title:

I think we are all manipulated, more or less, and From the Life of the Marionettes is about the manipulation of human beings, by forces outside and beyond them — forces you cannot control, and you cannot define. The personalities of Pete and Katarina, who appear in the first episode of Scenes from a Marriage, have always fascinated me. In a way, they existed long before [Scenes from a Marriage protagonists] Johan and Marianne, so I wanted to tell more about them. This is their story.

In casting, the filmmakers recruited all actors from the Residenztheater.

=== Filming ===
The film was shot in the Bavaria Film Studios in Munich, and at Tobis Film Studios, beginning in October 1979. Bergman's regular cinematographer Sven Nykvist returned for the project. Nykvist and Bergman mainly shot in black-and-white, but at the insistence of television broadcaster ZDF, some colour was added and a red tint was given to the prologue for fear the black-and-white would lose viewers.

German composer Rolf A. Wilhelm wrote the score, making use of timpani and glass harmonicas.

== Release ==
The premiere took place in July 1980 at a minor festival in Oxford, with Tobis Film as the main distributor. The film was originally made for television and had its TV premiere on German ZDF on 3 November 1980; it went to German theatres on 6 November. It was subsequently released in Swedish theatres on 24 January 1981.

On 28 January 1981, From the Life of the Marionettes screened on SVT1. The Criterion Collection released a Blu-ray on 20 November 2018, along with 38 other Bergman films, in the set Ingmar Bergman's Cinema.

== Reception ==
According to author Birgitta Steene, Swedish critics were generally "respectful but not enthusiastic". Janet Maslin credited Bergman for a "forceful" work despite what she found to be "less articulate or analytical" characters, praised Nykvist's shots in dream sequences, and positively reviewed Christine Buchegger and Robert Atzorn's performances. David Denby wrote "I wish [Bergman] had dramatized more and explained a whole lot less". People staff criticized it as "banal" with "no suspense". In his Movie Guide, Leonard Maltin gave the film three and a half stars, describing it as "Powerful, provocative".

The film was nominated for Best Foreign Language Film of the year by the U.S. National Board of Review. It currently holds a 64% approval rating on Rotten Tomatoes, based on 14 reviews. It is one of film-maker Wes Anderson's favourite movies.
