= Jörgen Lindström =

Swedish actor (born 1951)

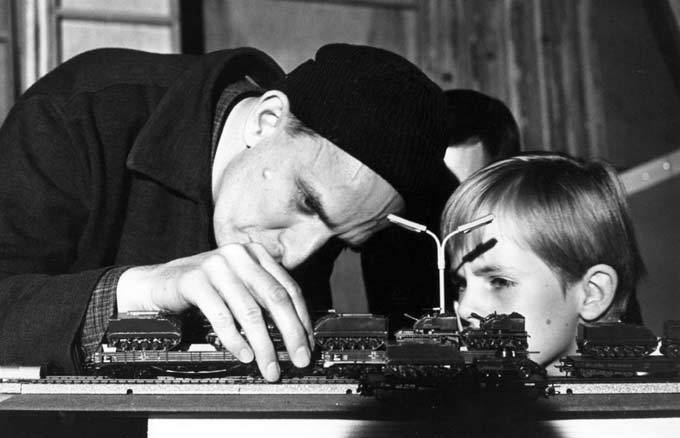
- Lindström with Ingmar Bergman on the set of The Silence (1963).
- Born: Carl Jörgen Lindström; May 19, 1951 (age 75); Nacka, Sweden
- Occupation: Actor
- Years active: 1959–1966

Carl Jörgen Lindström (born May 19, 1951 in Nacka, Sweden) is a Swedish former child actor.

Having been born in 1951, he was a child when director Ingmar Bergman cast him in a prominent role in his 1963 film The Silence. His character of Johan has been described as representing the one who perceives. Bergman cast him once again in his 1966 psychological drama Persona.

Lindström also played child roles in other films, but in adulthood ceased acting and moved into a career in a film laboratory. Author David Thomson expressed uncertainty as to his whereabouts by 2015. Ida Moen Johnson interviewed Lindström in 2017 for an academic paper published in 2019.

== Filmography ==
- 1959 - Åke and His World (Åke och hans värld)
- 1960 – 16 år
- 1963 – A Dream Play (Ett drömspel)
- 1963 – The Silence (Tystnaden)
- 1966 – Night Games (Nattlek)
- 1966 – Persona

== Bibliography ==
- Holmstrom, John. The Moving Picture Boy: An International Encyclopaedia from 1895 to 1995. Norwich, Michael Russell, 1996, p. 292-293.
