= 16 år =

- Genre: Drama
- Developed by: Hans Lagerkvist, Hans Alfredson
- Starring: Birgit Rosengren, Håkan Westergren, Sissi Kaiser
- Country of origin: Sweden
- Original language: Swedish
- No. of seasons: 1
- No. of episodes: 6

Production
- Running time: 30 minutes

Original release
- Release: 10 September – 24 December 1960

16 år ("16 Years") is a Swedish television series. It was first broadcast in 1960.

== Cast ==
- Birgit Rosengren
- Håkan Westergren
- Sissi Kaiser
- Mats Hådell
- Jörgen Lindström
- Elof Ahrl
