= Christine Buchegger =

Austrian actress (1942–2014)

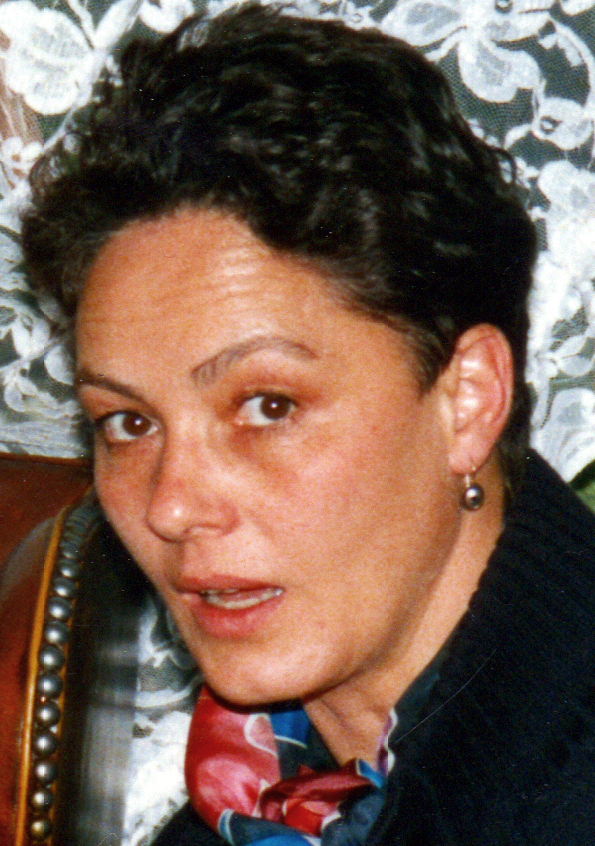
- Christine Buchegger around 1980 in Salzburg, Austria.
- Born: Christine Buchegger; November 19, 1942; Vienna, Austria
- Died: March 3, 2014 (aged 71); Munich, Germany
- Burial place: Nordfriedhof, Munich
- Education: Max Reinhardt Seminar, Vienna
- Occupation: Actress
- Years active: 1960–2014
- Spouse: Christian Kohlund

Christine Buchegger (19 November 1942 – 3 March 2014) was an Austrian theater and television actress, born in Vienna, Austria.

== Biography ==
Christine Buchegger was born in Vienna to Maria Buchegger originating from Pettenbach in Upper Austria. After finishing school she attended the Max Reinhardt Seminar, the School of Drama at the University of Music and Performing Arts in Vienna, Austria, for two years. Bucheggers first engagement was at the Vereinigten Bühnen Graz in Styria, afterwards she worked at the Linz State Theatre (Landestheater Linz) and the Wiener Volkstheater.

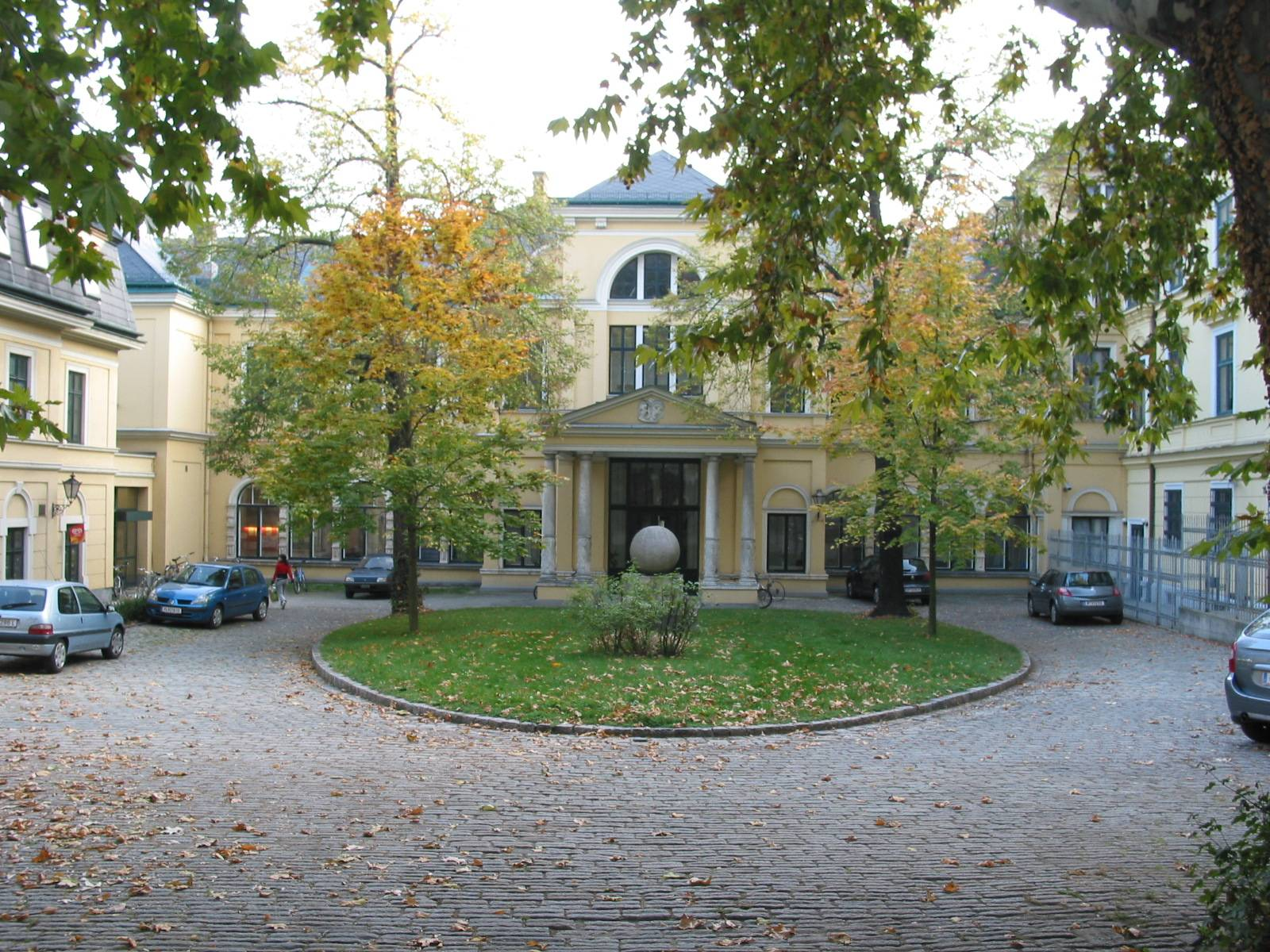
Reinhardt Seminar in Palais Cumberland

In 1972 she moved to Munich to play at the Bavarian State Theatre (Bayerische Staatsschauspiel) where she continued working until the 1990s. Important roles there included Fontanelle in Edward Bonds Lear (1973), Eliante in Der Menschenfeind (1975), Irina in Drei Schwestern (1978, directed by Ingmar Bergman), Kassandra in Agamemnon (1978), the lead role in Ibsens Hedda Gabler (1979) and the 'Buhlschaft' in Jedermann at the Salzburg Festival 1979 with Maximilian Schell in the lead role.

From 1980 she took a break from acting and returned 1984 to the stage performing Johanne Luise Heiberg in Per Olov Enquists Aus dem Leben der Regenwürmer and the Mutter in Frühlings Erwachen (1992).

Buchegger died on 3 March 2014 in Munich unexpectedly during minor surgery. She was 71 years old and is buried at the Nordfriedhof in Munich in an urn grave.

== Filmography ==
- 1960: Glocken läuten überall
- 1961: Das Land des Lächelns
- 1964: Die Schneekönigin
- 1966: Das Märchen
- 1970: Rebell in der Soutane
- 1971: Der Fall Eleni Voulgari
- 1972: Sultan zu verkaufen
- 1972: Das Hohelied
- 1972: The Salzburg Connection
- 1973: The Pedestrian
- 1973: Inferno
- 1975: Die Verschwörung des Fiesco zu Genua
- 1975: Derrick - Season 2, Episode 2: "Tod am Bahngleis"
- 1975: Lady Dracula (released: 1978)
- 1976: Graf Yoster: "Der Ton macht die Musik"
- 1976: Graf Yoster: "Undank ist der Welt Lohn"
- 1976: The Elixirs of the Devil
- 1977: Disorder and Early Torment
- 1977: Abelard
- 1977: Travesties
- 1978: Wilhelm Meisters Lehrjahre
- 1978: Derrick - Season 5, Episode 1: "Der Fotograf"
- 1979: Derrick - Season 6, Episode 3: "Schubachs Rückkehr"
- 1980: From the Life of the Marionettes
- 1985: Wind von Südost
- 1986: Derrick: "Ein eiskalter Hund"
- 1989: Derrick - Season 16, Episode 7: "Schrei in der Nacht"
- 1991: Derrick: "Penthaus"
- 1992: Mord im Wald
- 1993: Dann eben mit Gewalt
- 1993: Der rote Vogel
- 1994: Endloser Abschied
- 1994: Der Salzbaron (TV series)
- 1994: Derrick: "Nachts, als sie nach Hause lief"
- 1996: Liebe, Leben, Tod
- 1999: Frische Ware
- 1999: Die Rache der Carola Waas
- 1999: Der Schandfleck
- 2000: Nicht mit uns
- 2002: Rosamunde Pilcher: Mit den Augen der Liebe
