= Heinrich Laretei =

Estonian politician (1892–1973)

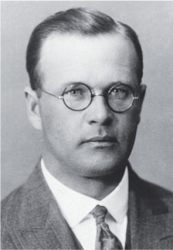
Heinrich Laretei

Heinrich Laretei (4 January 1892 – 3 April 1973) was an Estonian politician, diplomat and soldier. He was a member of the II and III Riigikogu. In 1926, he served as Minister of the Interior. After leaving the Riigikogu in November of that year, Laretei was succeeded by Alo Karineel.

Heinrich Laretei was born in Õisu. Heinrich Laretei's wife was Alma Laretei. They had two daughters, Maimu Evéquoz (1920–2012) and Käbi Laretei (1922–2014). When the Soviet Union occupied Estonia in 1940, Laretei was the ambassador of the Republic of Estonia to Sweden, in Stockholm. He did not recognize the occupation and annexation and refused to return to Estonia. He died in Stockholm in 1973, aged 81.
