= Ingmar Bergman's Cinema =

Blu-ray disc box set

- Cover artwork
- Director: Ingmar Bergman
- Distributor: The Criterion Collection
- Release date: November 20, 2018
- Runtime: 4537 minutes
- Format: Blu-ray
- Discs: 30

Ingmar Bergman's Cinema is a Blu-ray disc box set featuring 39 films directed by Ingmar Bergman, released by the Criterion Collection on November 20, 2018 in the United States. The set spans Bergman's early career, beginning in the 1940s, up to his final film in 2003. The films are organized non-chronologically, and are instead presented in four groupings that mimic the procession of a film festival. Accompanying the discs is a book featuring critical essays on each of the films, intended to guide the viewer through the experience. Of the 39 films featured, 18 had not been previously released by the Criterion Collection prior to their inclusion in the set.

The Criterion Collection announced the release of the set on July 13, 2018, in commemoration of Bergman's centenary birthday on July 14, 2018.

== Overview ==
The box set includes 39 films directed by Ingmar Bergman across 30 Blu-ray discs, spanning six decades. The films are arranged as a curated festival with 'opening' and 'closing' nights bookending double features and 'centerpiece' programs.

In addition to the films, the set comes with supplementary materials included on the individual discs, as well as on an exclusive supplementary disc presented as the final disc of the set. Introductions from Bergman himself are included for eleven of the films, while six also feature audio commentaries; additionally, there are over five hours of interviews with Bergman's key collaborators. Accompanying the discs is a 248-page book containing various essays on the films as they presented, intended to guide the viewer through the experience of watching each.

== Contents ==
=== Films ===
Key
†	Denotes films previously unreleased by either the Criterion Collection or their Eclipse line

Grouping	Disc no.	Film	Year	Ref.
"Opening Night"	1	Smiles of a Summer Night	1955	
"Opening Night"	2	Crisis	1946	
"Opening Night"	2	A Ship to India †	1947	
"Opening Night"	3	Wild Strawberries	1957	
"Opening Night"	4	To Joy	1950	
"Opening Night"	4	Summer Interlude	1951	
"Opening Night"	5	Summer with Monika	1953	
"Opening Night"	6	Dreams †	1955	
"Opening Night"	6	A Lesson in Love †	1954	
"Centerpiece 1"	7	Scenes from a Marriage — Television version	1973	
"Centerpiece 1"	8	Scenes from a Marriage — U.S. theatrical version	1973	
"Centerpiece 1"	8	Saraband †	2003	
"Centerpiece 1"	9	From the Life of the Marionettes †	1980	
"Centerpiece 1"	9	Hour of the Wolf †	1968	
"Centerpiece 1"	10	Shame (Note: At the time of the box set's release, Shame had not been released by the Criterion Collection; it was, however, given a standalone release three months later on February 4, 2019.)	1968	
"Centerpiece 1"	10	The Passion of Anna †	1969	
"Centerpiece 1"	11	Fårö Document †	1970	
"Centerpiece 1"	11	Fårö Document 1979 †	1979	
"Centerpiece 1"	12	Through a Glass Darkly	1961	
"Centerpiece 1"	13	Winter Light	1963	
"Centerpiece 1"	14	The Silence	1963	
"Centerpiece 1"	15	The Virgin Spring	1960	
"Centerpiece 2"	16	The Seventh Seal	1957	
"Centerpiece 2"	17	The Devil's Eye †	1960	
"Centerpiece 2"	17	All These Women †	1964	
"Centerpiece 2"	18	Sawdust and Tinsel	1953	
"Centerpiece 2"	18	The Rite †	1969	
"Centerpiece 2"	19	The Magician	1958	
"Centerpiece 2"	20	The Magic Flute	1975	
"Centerpiece 2"	20	After the Rehearsal †	1984	
"Centerpiece 2"	21	The Touch †	1971	
"Centerpiece 2"	21	The Serpent's Egg †	1977	
"Centerpiece 3"	22	Persona	1966	
"Centerpiece 3"	23	Thirst	1949	
"Centerpiece 3"	23	Port of Call	1948	
"Centerpiece 3"	24	Cries and Whispers	1972	
"Centerpiece 3"	25	Waiting Women †	1952	
"Centerpiece 3"	25	Brink of Life †	1958	
"Centerpiece 3"	26	Autumn Sonata	1978	
"Closing Night"	27	Fanny and Alexander – Television version	1982	
"Closing Night"	28	Fanny and Alexander – Theatrical version	1982	

=== Additional discs ===
Grouping	Disc no.	Content(s)	Year	Ref.
N/A	29	The Making of Fanny and Alexander	1984	
N/A	30	Additional supplements	—N/a	

== Packaging and artwork ==
Ingmar Bergman's Cinema is packaged in a hardbox which contains a cardboard binder holding the individual discs. The cover artwork for the box features a still image from Persona (1966), while the back displays a portrait of Bergman.

== Reception ==
The New York Times critic Glenn Kenny assessed the set as "impressive and almost exhaustive", and interpreted it as "a fresh case for [Bergman's] continuing importance", in response to criticisms such as Jonathan Rosenbaum's 2007 opinion piece "Scenes From an Overrated Career". David Mermelstein of The Wall Street Journal noted that, "despite some oddities in presentation," the set "shows [that] the director’s work continues to merit close attention."
