= Skattungbyn =

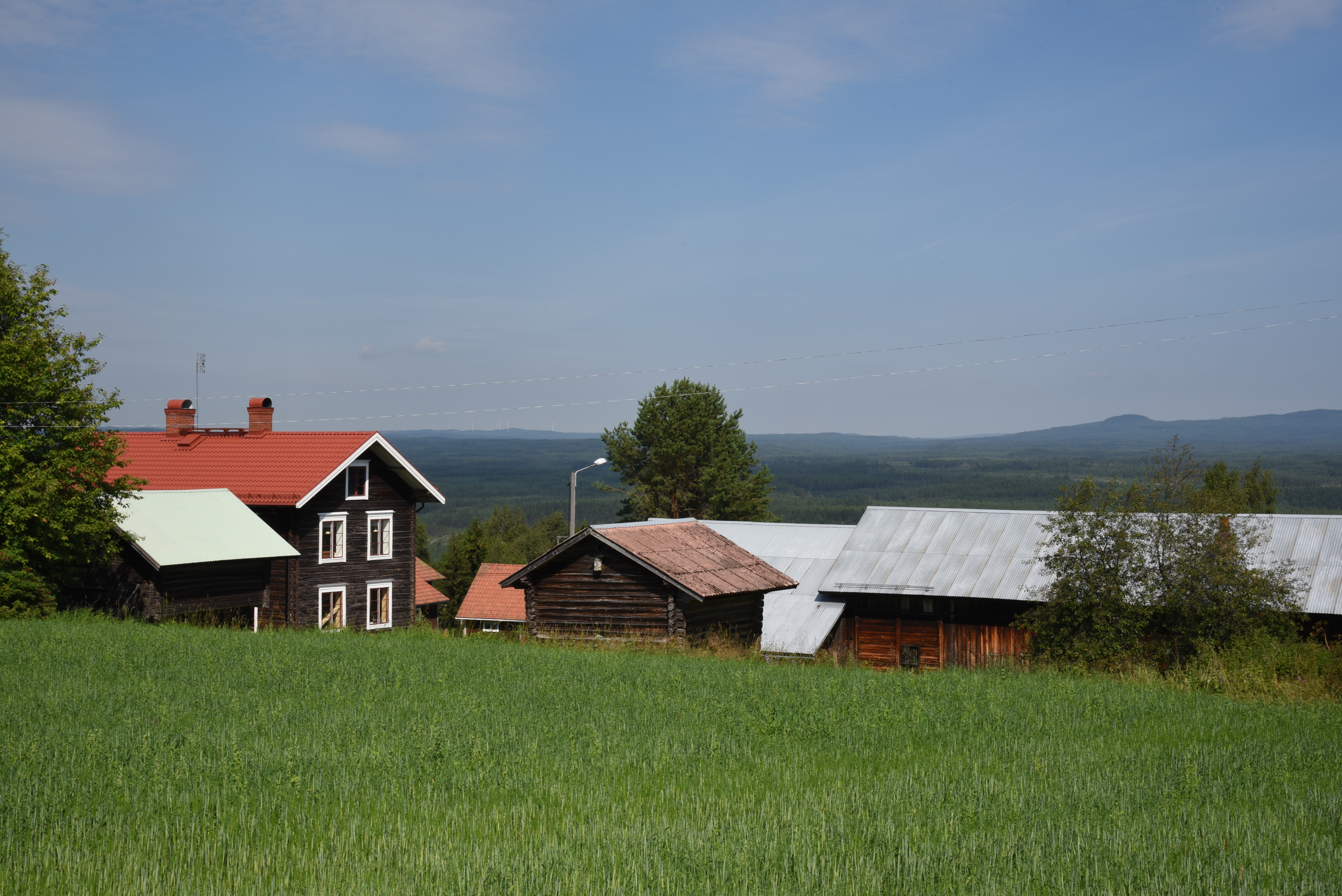
- Vy över Skattungbyn

- Location within Dalarna Location within Sweden
- Coordinates: 61°12′N 14°52′E
- Country: Sweden
- Province: Dalarna
- County: Dalarna County
- Municipality: Orsa Municipality

Area
  - Total: 1.43 km^{2} (0.55 sq mi)

Population (31 December 2010)
  - Total: 295
  - Density: 206/km^{2} (530/sq mi)
- Time zone: UTC+1 (CET)
  - Summer (DST): UTC+2 (CEST)

Skattungbyn is a locality situated in Orsa Municipality, Dalarna County, Sweden with 310 inhabitants in 2015.

Skattungbyn is the site of the Skattunge Church, a 19th-century building which replaced a 17th-century wooden chapel. It also is the birthplace of economist Gunnar Myrdal.
