= Sven Nykvist =

Swedish cinematographer (1922-2006)

- Sven Nykvist on the cover of his book Vördnad för ljuset ("Reverence for the light"). 1997.
- Born: Sven Vilhem Nykvist; 3 December 1922; Moheda, Kronobergs län, Sweden
- Died: 20 September 2006 (aged 83); Stockholm, Sweden
- Years active: 1942–2001
- Spouses: Ulla Söderlind; (m. 1952–1968): Ulrika Nykvist
- Children: Carl-Gustaf Nykvist

Sven Vilhem Nykvist (Swedish pronunciation: [svɛn ˈvɪ̌lːhɛlm ˈnŷːkvɪst]; 3 December 1922 – 20 September 2006) was a Swedish cinematographer and filmmaker, best known for his collaboration with director Ingmar Bergman.

Often considered to be one of the greatest cinematographers of all time, his work is generally noted for its naturalism and simplicity. He also won the Academy Award for Best Cinematography for Cries and Whispers (1972) and Fanny and Alexander (1982).

== Early life and education ==
Nykvist was born in Moheda, Kronobergs län, Sweden. His parents were Lutheran missionaries who spent most of their lives in the Belgian Congo, so Nykvist was raised by relatives in Sweden and saw his parents rarely. His father was a keen amateur photographer of African wildlife, whose activities may have sparked Nykvist's interest in the visual arts.

A talented athlete in his youth, Nykvist's first cinematic effort was to film himself taking a high jump, to improve his jumping technique. After a year at the Municipal School for Photographers in Stockholm, he entered the Swedish film industry at the age of 19.

== Career ==
In 1941, he became an assistant cameraman at Sandrews studio, working on The Poor Millionaire. He moved to Italy in 1943 to work at Cinecittà Studios, returning to Sweden two years later. In 1945, aged 23, he became a full-fledged cinematographer, with his first solo credit on The Children from Frostmo Mountain.

He worked on many small Swedish films for the next few years, and spent some time with his parents in Africa filming wildlife, footage which was later released as a documentary entitled In the Footsteps of the Witch Doctor (also known as Under the Southern Cross).

Back in Sweden, he began to work with the director Ingmar Bergman on Sawdust and Tinsel (US: The Naked Night, 1953). He was one of three cinematographers to work on the film, the others being Gunnar Fischer and Hilding Bladh.

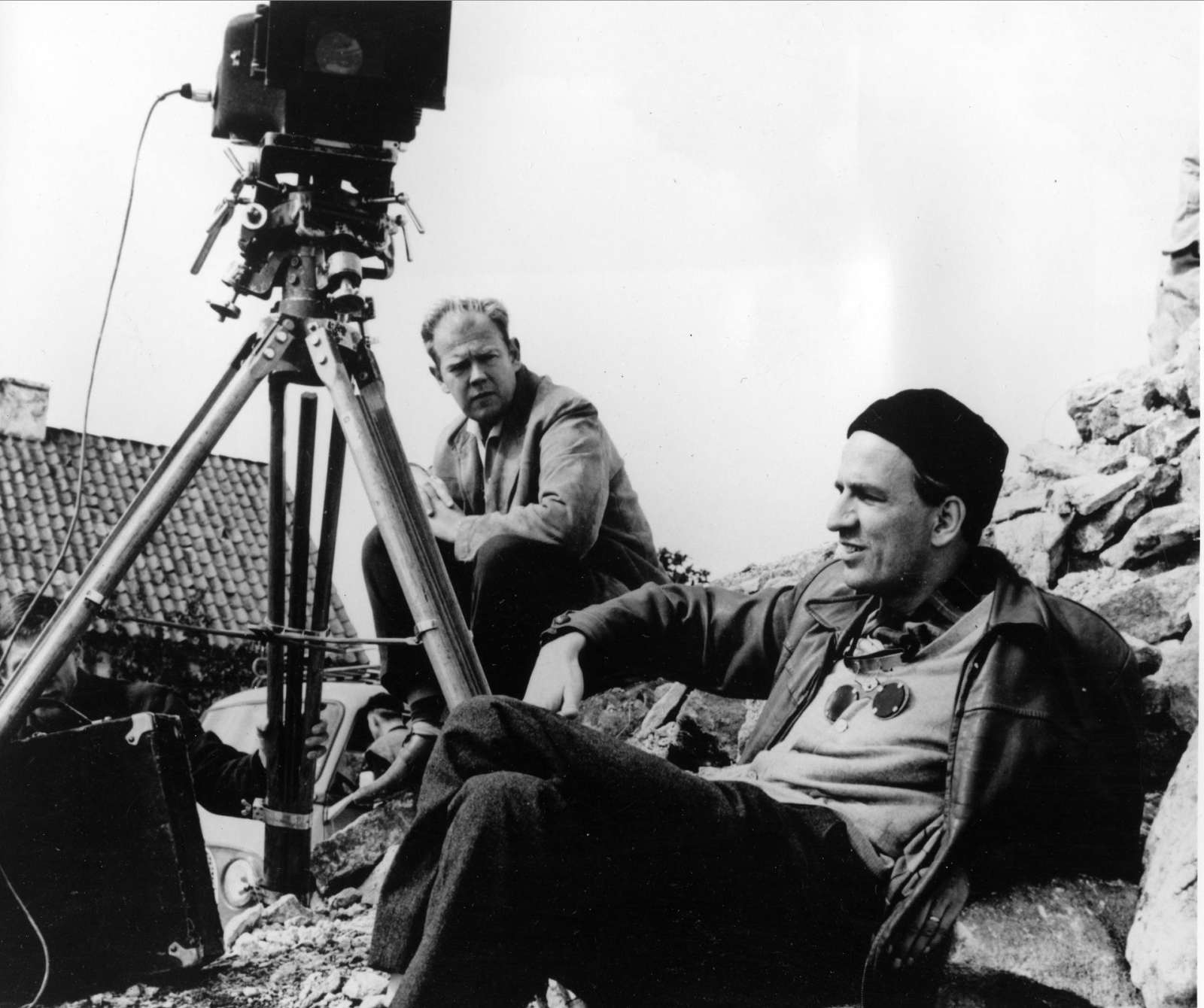
Sven Nykvist with director Ingmar Bergman during the production of Through a Glass Darkly, 1960

Nykvist would eventually become Bergman's regular cinematographer. He worked as sole cameraman on Bergman's Oscar-winning films The Virgin Spring (1959) and Through a Glass Darkly (1960). He revolutionised the way faces are shot in close-up with Bergman's psychologic drama Persona (1966).

After working with other Swedish directors, including Alf Sjöberg and Mai Zetterling, he then worked in the United States and elsewhere, on: Richard Fleischer's The Last Run (1971); Louis Malle's Black Moon (1975) and Pretty Baby (1978); Roman Polanski's The Tenant (1976); Jan Troell's Hurricane (1979); Norman Jewison's Agnes of God (1985); Woody Allen's Another Woman (1988), Crimes and Misdemeanors (1989) and Celebrity (1998); Richard Attenborough's Chaplin (1992); Nora Ephron's Sleepless in Seattle (1993).

Nykvist won the Academy Award for Best Cinematography for two of his films: Cries and Whispers (1972), and Fanny and Alexander (1982), both of which were Bergman films. Nykvist said that his favorite cinematography was Fanny and Alexander. At the 9th Guldbagge Awards in 1973 he won the Special Achievement award for his work on Cries and Whispers. He was also nominated for a Cinematography Oscar for The Unbearable Lightness of Being (1988), and in the category of Best Foreign Language Film for The Ox (1991), in which he directed Max von Sydow and Liv Ullmann.

Nykvist won a special prize at the Cannes Film Festival for his work on The Sacrifice (1986), the last film directed by Andrei Tarkovsky, who by then was in exile from his native Russia. He was the first European cinematographer to join the American Society of Cinematographers, and received a Lifetime Achievement Award from the ASC in 1996.

== Personal life and death ==
His ex-wife, Ulrika, died in 1982. Nykvist's career was brought to an abrupt end in 1998 when he was diagnosed with aphasia; he died in 2006, aged 83. He wrote three books, including Curtain Call published in 1999. His son Carl-Gustaf Nykvist directed a 1999 documentary about him, Light Keeps Me Company.

== Filmography ==
=== Cinematographer ===
==== Film ====
Year	Title	Director	Notes
1943	In Darkest Smaland	Schamyl Bauman	With Olle Nordemar
1945	Gomorron Bill!	Lauritz Falk; Peter Winner	With Hilding Bladh and Göran Strindberg
1945	Barnen från Frostmofjället	Rolf Husberg	With Olle Nordemar
1945	13 stolar	Börje Larsson	
1946	Saltstänk och krutgubbar	Schamyl Bauman	
1947	Lata Lena och blåögda Per	Lennart Wallén	
1947	Maj på Malö	Schamyl Bauman	
1949	The Devil and the Smalander	Ivar Johansson	With Carl-Erik Edlund
1949	Sjösalavår	Per Gunvall	
1949	Big Lasse of Delsbo	Ivar Johansson	
1949	Bohus Battalion	Sölve Cederstrand; Arthur Spjuth	
1950	Loffe blir polis	Elof Ahrle	With Göran Strindberg
1950	The Realm of the Rye	Ivar Johansson	
1952	In Lilac Time	Ivar Johansson	
1952	Under södra korset	Himself; Olof Bergström	
1953	Barabbas	Alf Sjöberg	With Göran Strindberg
1953	The Road to Klockrike	Gunnar Skoglund	
1953	Sawdust and Tinsel	Ingmar Bergman	With Hilding Bladh
1954	Storm over Tjurö	Arne Mattsson	
1954	Karin Månsdotter	Alf Sjöberg	
1954	Salka Valka	Arne Mattsson	
1955	The Magnificent Lie	Schamyl Bauman; Mike Road	
1955	Darling of Mine	Schamyl Bauman	With Göran Strindberg
1955	Sista ringen	Gunnar Skoglund	
1956	Laughing in the Sunshine	Daniel Birt	
1956	Blånande hav	Gunnar Skoglund	
1956	Gorilla	Himself; Lorens Marmstedt; Lars-Henrik Ottoson	
1956	Night Child	Gunnar Hellström	
1956	The Girl in Tails	Arne Mattsson	
1956	Den tappre soldaten Jönsson	Håkan Bergström	With Rune Ericson
1957	A Dreamer's Journey	Lars-Magnus Lindgren	
1957	Synnöve Solbakken	Gunnar Hellström	
1958	The Lady in Black	Arne Mattsson	
1958	Laila	Rolf Husberg	
1959	The Angel Who Pawned Her Harp	Kurt Hoffmann	
1959	Får jag låna din fru?	Arne Mattsson	
1960	The Virgin Spring	Ingmar Bergman	
1960	Stage Fright	Kurt Hoffmann	
1960	A Matter of Morals	John Cromwell	
1960	The Judge	Alf Sjöberg	
1961	The Marriage of Mr. Mississippi	Kurt Hoffmann	
1961	Through a Glass Darkly	Ingmar Bergman	
1961	Murder Party	Helmut Ashley	
1961	Lita på mej, älskling!	Sven Lindberg	
1962	Snow White and the Seven Jugglers	Kurt Hoffmann	
1963	Winter Light	Ingmar Bergman	
1963	Love Has to Be Learned	Kurt Hoffman	
1963	The Silence	Ingmar Bergman	
1963	Prins hatt under jorden	Bengt Lagerkvist	
1964	All These Women	Ingmar Bergman	
1964	To Love	Jörn Donner	
1964	The Dress	Vilgot Sjöman	
1964	Loving Couples	Mai Zetterling	
1965	Lianbron	Himself	
1965	Transit	Erwin Leiser; Bernhard Wicki	
1966	Persona	Ingmar Bergman	
1967	Roseanna	Hans Abramson	
1967	Bränt barn	Hans Abramson	
1968	Hour of the Wolf	Ingmar Bergman	
1968	Shame	Ingmar Bergman	
1969	An-Magritt	Arne Skouen	
1969	The Passion of Anna	Ingmar Bergman	
1970	One Day in the Life of Ivan Denisovich	Caspar Wrede	
1971	The Touch	Ingmar Bergman	
1971	The Last Run	Richard Fleischer	
1971	Lockfågeln	Torgny Wickman	
1972	A Free Woman	Volker Schlöndorff	
1972	Siddhartha	Conrad Rooks	
1972	Cries and Whispers	Ingmar Bergman	
1974	The Dove	Charles Jarrott	
1974	Scenes from a Marriage	Ingmar Bergman	
1974	Ransom	Caspar Wrede	
1975	The Magic Flute	Ingmar Bergman	
1975	Monismanien 1995	Kenne Fant	
1975	Black Moon	Louis Malle	
1976	Face to Face	Ingmar Bergman	
1976	The Tenant	Roman Polanski	
1977	The Serpent's Egg	Ingmar Bergman	
1978	Pretty Baby	Louis Malle	
1978	En och en	Erland Josephson; Himself; Ingrid Thulin	
1978	Autumn Sonata	Ingmar Bergman	
1979	Hurricane	Jan Troell	
1979	Starting Over	Alan J. Pakula	
1980	Marmalade Revolution	Erland Josephson	Also credited as producer
1980	Willie & Phil	Paul Mazursky	
1981	The Postman Always Rings Twice	Bob Rafelson	
1982	Cannery Row	David S. Ward	
1982	Fanny and Alexander	Ingmar Bergman	
1983	Star 80	Bob Fosse	
1983	La tragédie de Carmen	Peter Brook	
1984	Swann in Love	Volker Schlöndorff	
1985	Agnes of God	Norman Jewison	
1986	Dream Lover	Alan J. Pakula	
1986	The Sacrifice	Andrei Tarkovsky	
1988	The Unbearable Lightness of Being	Philip Kaufman	
1988	Katinka	Max von Sydow	With Claus Loof
1988	Another Woman	Woody Allen	
1989	Crimes and Misdemeanors	Woody Allen	
1991	Buster's Bedroom	Rebecca Horn	
1991	The Ox	Himself	
1992	Chaplin	Richard Attenborough	
1993	Sleepless in Seattle	Nora Ephron	
1993	What's Eating Gilbert Grape	Lasse Hallström	
1994	With Honors	Alek Keshishian	
1994	Only You	Norman Jewison	
1994	Mixed Nuts	Nora Ephron	
1995	Something to Talk About	Lasse Hallström	
1995	Kristin Lavransdatter	Liv Ullmann	
1996	Private Confessions	Liv Ullmann	
1998	Celebrity	Woody Allen	
1998	Curtain Call	Peter Yates	

==== Short film ====
Year	Title	Director	Notes
1973	Kallelsen	Himself	
1976	De fördömda kvinnornas dans	Ingmar Bergman	
1989	Oedipus Wrecks	Woody Allen	Segment of New York Stories

Documentary short

Year	Title	Director	Notes
1943	En Stockholmssilhuett	Bibi Lindström	
1946	Där lägereldarna brinna	Mauritz Sandin	
1961	Africa and Schweitzer	Jan Sadlo	
1995	Liv Ullmann		Segment of Lumière and Company

==== Television ====
TV movies

Year	Title	Director	Notes
1969	The Rite	Ingmar Bergman	
1970	Fårö Document	Ingmar Bergman	Documentary film
1971	Karpfs Karriere	Bernhard Wicki	
1973	Das blaue Hotel	Stanislav Barabas	
1980	From the Life of the Marionettes	Ingmar Bergman	
1984	After the Rehearsal	Ingmar Bergman	
1986	Nobody's Child	Lee Grant	

TV series

Year	Title	Director	Notes
1973	Scenes from a Marriage	Ingmar Bergman	Miniseries
1975	Nouvelles d'Henry James	Volker Schlöndorff	Episode "Les raisons de Georgina"
2001	Nova		Episode "Life's Greatest Miracle"

=== Director ===
Year	Title	Director	Writer	Producer	Notes
1952	Under södra korset	Yes	Yes	No	Co-directed with Olof Bergström
1956	Gorilla	Yes	No	No	Co-directed with Lorens Marmstedt and Lars-Henrik Ottoson
1965	Lianbron	Yes	No	No	
1973	Kallelsen	Yes	Yes	No	Short film
1978	En och en	Yes	No	Yes	Co-directed with Erland Josephson and Ingrid Thulin
1991	The Ox	Yes	Yes	No	

== Awards and nominations ==
Year	Award	Category	Title	Result
1973	Academy Awards	Best Cinematography	Cries and Whispers	Won
1983	Academy Awards	Best Cinematography	Fanny and Alexander	Won
1988	Academy Awards	Best Cinematography	The Unbearable Lightness of Being	Nominated
1988	American Society of Cinematographers	Outstanding Achievement in Theatrical Releases	The Unbearable Lightness of Being	Nominated
1996	American Society of Cinematographers	Life Achievement Award		Won
1973	BAFTA Awards	Best Cinematography	Cries and Whispers	Nominated
1983	BAFTA Awards	Best Cinematography	Fanny and Alexander	Won
1983	British Society of Cinematographers	Best Cinematography in a Theatrical Feature Film	Fanny and Alexander	Won
1988	British Society of Cinematographers	Best Cinematography in a Theatrical Feature Film	The Unbearable Lightness of Being	Nominated
1992	British Society of Cinematographers	Best Cinematography in a Theatrical Feature Film	Chaplin	Nominated
1986	Cannes Film Festival	Best Artistic Contribution	The Sacrifice	Won
1988	Independent Spirit Awards	Best Cinematography	The Unbearable Lightness of Being	Won
1983	Los Angeles Film Critics Association	Best Cinematography	Fanny and Alexander	Won
1988	Los Angeles Film Critics Association	Best Cinematography	The Unbearable Lightness of Being	Nominated
1966	National Society of Film Critics	Best Cinematography	Persona	Nominated
1968	National Society of Film Critics	Best Cinematography	Shame	Nominated
1973	National Society of Film Critics	Best Cinematography	Cries and Whispers	Won
1988	National Society of Film Critics	Best Cinematography	The Unbearable Lightness of Being	Nominated
1983	New York Film Critics Circle	Best Cinematographer	Fanny and Alexander	Nominated
1988	New York Film Critics Circle	Best Cinematographer	The Unbearable Lightness of Being	Nominated

== Legacy ==
The Sven Nykvist Cinematography Award is awarded annually at the Gothenburg Film Festival, presented in collaboration with the Sven Nykvist Cinematography Foundation. In 2003, Nykvist was judged one of history's ten most influential cinematographers in a survey conducted by the International Cinematographers Guild.
