= The Touch (1971 film) =

1971 film by Ingmar Bergman

- Theatrical release poster
- Directed by: Ingmar Bergman
- Written by: Ingmar Bergman
- Produced by: Lars-Owe Carlberg; Ingmar Bergman
- Starring: Elliott Gould; Bibi Andersson; Max von Sydow
- Cinematography: Sven Nykvist
- Production companies: ABC Pictures; Cinematograph A.B.
- Distributed by: Svensk Filmindustri (Sweden); Cinerama Releasing Corporation (United States)
- Release dates: 14 July 1971 (New York City); 18 August 1971 (United States); 30 August 1971 (Sweden)
- Running time: 112 minutes
- Countries: Sweden; United States
- Language: English
- Budget: $1.2 million
- Box office: $1.1 million

The Touch (Swedish: Beröringen) is a 1971 romantic drama film directed and written by Ingmar Bergman and starring Max von Sydow, Bibi Andersson, Elliott Gould, and Sheila Reid. The film tells the story of an affair between a married woman and an impetuous foreigner. It contains references to the Virgin Mary and the Holocaust.

Produced by ABC Pictures, The Touch was Bergman's first English-language film, but made in two versions - one in Swedish and English, the other wholly in English. It was shot on the island of Gotland in Sweden in 1970. Cinematographer Sven Nykvist shot it in Eastmancolor. Gould, cast over Paul Newman and Robert Redford, believed Bergman's screenplay was semi-autobiographical.

The film received mixed to negative reviews and failed at the box office. It later had a limited rerelease by the Film Society of Lincoln Center in 2011 and a home media release by The Criterion Collection in 2018.

== Plot ==
In a small town in Sweden, Karin is a housewife, married to a hospital physician named Andreas and bringing up their two children. Visiting the clinic where her mother is ill, she finds her dead. David, an American archaeologist sees her overcome with sorrow. The couple ask David to dinner at their house and he tells them about his work at a medieval church, where a 500-year-old wooden statue of the Virgin Mary has been uncovered. He also tells Karin that he fell in love with her the day he saw her at the clinic.

Karin visits David in his apartment and agrees to have sex with him. She tells him this is her first affair and that she is uncertain if she is in love with him, but it is significant for her. As the affair continues, David's moods always prevail and he is frequently distant, overbearing, and angry. When she shows up under the influence of alcohol, and having failed to quit smoking as they agreed, he slaps her. Later he shares his family history with her, telling her many of his relatives were murdered in Nazi concentration camps during World War II.

Eventually, Andreas visits David, revealing he has been receiving anonymous poison pen letters telling him David is having an affair with Karin. David dismisses the visit as absurd, and argues when Andreas reminds him that he had cared for David after an attempted suicide. In the church, David shows Karin the restored statue of Mary, telling her that it is being consumed from inside by a previously unknown species of insect. He then leaves for London, and Karin tells Andreas she feels she must go to find out why he left her. Andreas sternly tells her that if she leaves, she cannot return to their marriage, but she departs anyway.

Going to David's address in London, Karin finds a woman with congenital health problems named Sara and is surprised to hear Sara say she is David's sister, though he had told Karin he had no family left. Sara guesses Karin is pregnant, though Karin refuses to say if the father is Andreas or David. Sara also declares that David will never leave her. Karin goes, saying she does not think she will return.

Back in Sweden, David asks Karin to meet him. He tells her he finds life without her intolerable, and that their relationship has changed him, and that he now cares about what will happen to them. He says he has accepted a position at a Danish university and asks Karin to come with him, with her children. Karin rejects the offer, citing her "duty" to remain. He accuses her of lying and cowardice as they separate.

== Cast ==
- Elliott Gould as David Kovac
- Bibi Andersson as Karin Vergerus
- Max von Sydow as Andreas Vergerus
- Sheila Reid as Sara Kovac
- Margareta Byström as Secretary to Andreas Vergerus (uncredited)
- Elsa Ebbesen as Hospital Matron (uncredited)
- Dennis Gotobed as English civil servant (uncredited)
- Staffan Hallerstam as Anders Vergerus (uncredited)
- Barbro Hiort af Ornäs as Karin's mother (uncredited)
- Åke Lindström as Dr. Holm (uncredited)
- Ann-Christin Lobråten as Museum employee (uncredited)
- Karin Nilsson as Neighbour (uncredited)
- Maria Nolgård as Agnes Vergerus (uncredited)
- Erik Nyhlén as The Archeologist (uncredited)
- Bengt Ottekil as Bell boy (uncredited)
- Alan Simon as Therapist at museum (uncredited)
- Per Sjöstrand as Therapist (uncredited)
- Aino Taube as Woman on stairs (uncredited)
- Mimmo Wåhlander as Nurse (uncredited)
- Carol Zavis as Stewardess (uncredited)

== Production ==
=== Development ===
During a 1964 production in London, Swedish director Ingmar Bergman met Morton Baum, a representative of the American Broadcasting Company, which was launching a film production arm. Bergman concluded a contract with ABC for $1 million. The Touch was Bergman's first English language film, and he viewed it as the first love story film he ever made.

In drawing up his story, Bergman was inspired by the death of his friend, an actor, 15 years previously. The death of his father, Erik Bergman, also informed the visuals of the opening hospital scene. Ingmar Bergman submitted a 56-page film treatment to Baum, which resembled a novella rather than a screenplay.

=== Casting ===
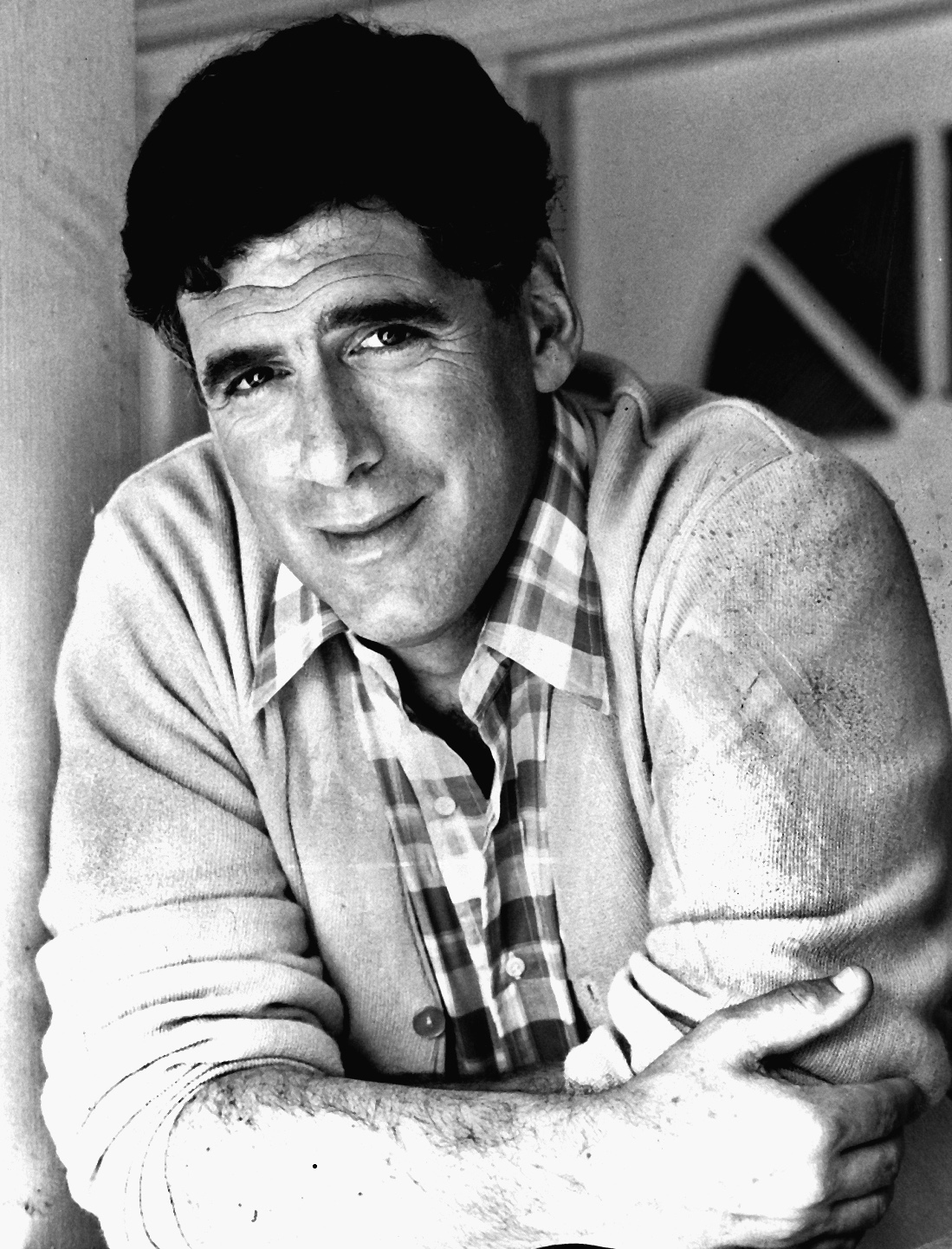
Elliott Gould thought it was an honour to be the first American actor in an Ingmar Bergman film, though it could harm his career.

Bergman selected actor Elliott Gould on the basis of his work in Getting Straight. Paul Newman, Robert Redford and Dustin Hoffman had also been proposed by ABC. Gould stated that he "got a migraine" when he read the first sex scene in the screenplay, and that he believed the film could potentially harm his career, but felt it was an honour to be the first American actor in a Bergman film.

Bergman had written the character Karin with Liv Ullmann in mind, but when Ullmann was unavailable, he offered it to Bibi Andersson. Andersson said she had reservations, both because she was the second choice for the role and because she had just played a similar role, but said she did not feel like she could turn down Bergman's offers.

=== Filming ===
The film was shot on the island of Gotland, as well as at Film-Tcknik Studios in Stockholm and in London, between 14 September and 13 November 1970. Cinematographer Sven Nykvist employed Eastmancolor for his work. Using various shades of make-up, Nykvist took several days with Andersson's test shots.

Gould believed Andersson's character was influenced by Ingrid Karlebo, a woman Bergman was living with at the time, and that the film was semi-autobiographical. The sex scene was filmed on a real bed, though Bergman had pledged to use a platform. Bergman and Gould spent hours having conversations to help create the film's atmosphere.

"They had thought there could be some commerciality to me doing that picture at that time because I was, uh, so hot", said Gould later. "I was the leading male actor for a moment in the Western world, and I think that was embarrassing to him, because the way it was sold by ABC, with the beautiful picture of me and Bibi…the movie is not about a woman and a man. It was all about the woman. And it was far more revolutionary than people could even begin to think, in terms of the woman’s psyche and journey".

Andersson described her relationship with Bergman during production as tense. Actress Sheila Reid stated Bergman consulted with her about how the British apartment should look, and that her scene involved some improvisation. Rehearsals lasted from 11 a.m. to 4 p.m.

== Release ==
The film opened in New York City on 14 July 1971. It had a wider release on 18 August, and premiered in Stockholm on 30 August. Bergman and Andersson soon after gave an interview on The Dick Cavett Show, and Bergman married Ingrid Karlebo that year. In Sweden, the film was distributed by SF Studios and in the U.S. by Cinerama Releasing Corporation. The film screened at the Berlin International Film Festival in July 1971, and in 1972 it played at the Belgrade Film Festival.

The film aired on television in the 1980s and in 2011, the Film Society of Lincoln Center re-released it in theatres in New York City. The Criterion Collection announced a Blu-ray release in Region A for 20 November 2018, along with 38 other Bergman films, in the set Ingmar Bergman's Cinema.

== Reception ==
The film earned rentals of $485,000 in North America and $650,000 in other countries. It recorded an overall loss of $1,080,000.

Aside from box office losses, reviews were "generally negative". Roger Ebert gave The Touch two and a half stars, calling it "an unexpected failure of tone from a director to whom tone has usually been second nature," but doubting that language was the issue. In The New York Times, Vincent Canby believed language was the problem, describing the dialogue as "lifeless translations" and the film as dull. Much of the negative attention was directed at Gould. Richard Schickel was favourable, calling the film "as mature, mysterious and disturbing as anything Bergman has done in the last few years". Gene Siskel awarded three out four stars, writing, "In The Touch, Bergman is not a magician, but a fine filmmaker presenting a small story". Other favourable reviews were written by Penelope Gilliatt in The New Yorker, Molly Haskell in Village Voice and Jan Dawson in The Monthly Film Bulletin, who wrote it was "probably the most memorable and the most moving portrait of a lady that Bergman has given us". At the Belgrade Film Festival, Andersson won an award for Best Actress.

In 2011, Richard Brody called the film "very rare and very beautiful". However, Robbie Freeling, writing for IndieWire, panned it as "a maligned work that nonetheless betrays the underlying, but univocal idiosyncrasies of its author". Time Out's review states Bergman's "analysis of human relationships is as complex as ever". The film today holds a 64% approval rating on Rotten Tomatoes, based on 25 reviews, with an average rating of 6.2/10.

The Touch is, along with This Can't Happen Here one of the Bergman films Bergman himself personally disliked the most.

== Themes ==
Paul Scherer at Indiana University South Bend argued the film contains "fairly explicit reference to the Garden of Eden and such related themes as Satan, temptation and the fall". Scherer also noted critic James Gay argued anti-Semitism was vaguely a theme in the film, while Virginia Wexman said the film relied on "poetic imagery".

The statue of Mary also features in the film's themes. The statue has a small smile, and resembles Karin's mother. Bergman had earlier expressed his psychological difficulty distinguishing between wife and mother, and writer Frank Gado argues that Karin's mother's death removes her from Karin and allows David to love her. The larvae eating the statue may represent David and Karin's fetus.
