= The Great Movies =

Publication

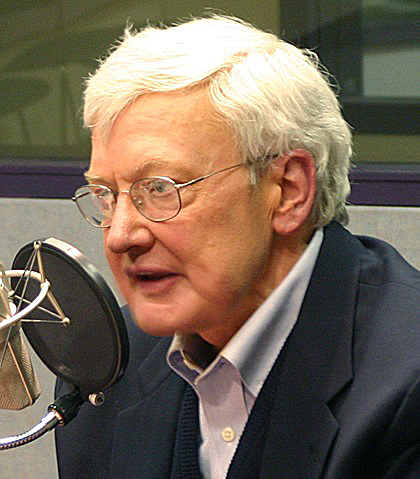
"One of the gifts a movie lover can give another is the title of a wonderful film they have not yet discovered. Here are more than 300 reconsiderations and appreciations of movies from the distant past to the recent past, all of movies that I consider worthy of being called 'great.'" — Roger Ebert

The Great Movies is the name of several publications, both online and in print, from Roger Ebert, an American film critic and columnist for The Chicago Sun-Times. The object was, as Ebert put it, to "make a tour of the landmarks of the first century of cinema", by writing essays on films Ebert considered particularly well-made, important or influential.

The Great Movies was published as four books:

- The Great Movies, published in November 2003 (544 pages, Three Rivers Press, ISBN 978-0767910385)
- The Great Movies II published in February 2006 (517 pages, Three Rivers Press, ISBN 978-0767919869)
- The Great Movies III, published in October 2011 (440 pages, University of Chicago Press, ISBN 978-0226182094)
- The Great Movies IV, published in September 2016 (288 pages, University of Chicago Press, ISBN 978-0226403984)

== See also ==
- 1001 Movies You Must See Before You Die, a similar-themed book with essays from 70 different critics, released in 2003
- List of films considered the best
