= 3rd European Film Awards =

1990 film awards ceremony in Glasgow, UK

The 3rd European Film Awards
- Date: 2 December 1990
- Location: Glasgow, United Kingdom
- Presented by: European Film Academy

The 3rd Annual European Film Awards were given out in 1990.

== Winners and nominees ==
Bold indicates winner in the category.

=== European Film ===
- (Italy) **Porte aperte (Open Doors)**
- (France) Cyrano de Bergerac
- (Soviet Union) Мать (Mother)
- (Poland) Przesluchanie (Interrogation)
- (Sweden) Skyddsängeln (The Guardian Angel)
- (Finland) Tulitikkutehtaan tyttö (The Match Factory Girl)
- (Spain) ¡Ay Carmela!

=== Young European Film ===
- (United Kingdom) **Henry V**
- (Spain) La blanca paloma (The White Dove)
- (Italy) Turnè (On Tour)
- (France) Un monde sans pitié (Love Without Pity)
- (Soviet Union) Замри, умри, воскресни! (Lie Still, Die, Revive)

=== European Actor ===
- **Kenneth Branagh for Henry V**
- Gérard Depardieu for Cyrano de Bergerac
- Philip Zandén for Skyddsängeln (The Guardian Angel)

=== European Actress ===
- **Carmen Maura for ¡Ay Carmela!**
- Anne Brochet for Cyrano de Bergerac
- Krystyna Janda for Przesluchanie (Interrogation)

=== European Supporting Actor ===
- **Dmitry Pevtsov for Мать (Mother)**
- Gabino Diego for ¡Ay Carmela!
- Björn Kjellman for Skyddsängeln (The Guardian Angel)

=== European Supporting Actress ===
- **Malin Ek for Skyddsängeln (The Guardian Angel)**
- Lena Nylen for Skyddsängeln (The Guardian Angel)
- Gunilla Röör for Skyddsängeln (The Guardian Angel)

=== European Screenwriter ===
- **Vitali Kanevsky** for Замри, умри, воскресни! (Lie Still, Die, Revive)
- Ryszard Bugajski and Janusz Dymek for Przesluchanie (Interrogation)
- Etienne Glaser, Madeleine Gustafsson and Suzanne Osten for Skyddsängeln (The Guardian Angel)

=== European Cinematographer ===
- **Tonino Nardi for Porte aperte (Open Doors)**
- Pierre Lhomme for Cyrano de Bergerac
- Göran Nilsson for Skyddsängeln (The Guardian Angel)

=== European Film Composer ===
No award was given in this category.

- Jean-Luc Godard for Nouvelle Vague (New Wave)
- Jürgen Knieper for December Bride
- Jean-Claude Petit for Cyrano de Bergerac

=== European Production Designer ===
- **Ezio Frigerio and Franca Squarciapino for Cyrano de Bergerac**
- Yuri Pashigoryev for Замри, умри, воскресни! (Lie Still, Die, Revive)
- Ben van Os, Jan Roelfs and Jean-Paul Gaultier for The Cook, the Thief, His Wife & Her Lover

== Special awards ==
- Special Jury Award I — Gian Maria Volonté
- Special Jury Award II — December Bride
- European Discovery of the Year — Ennio Fantastichini
- European Documentary Film of the Year — Šķērsiela (The Crossroad)
- Special Mention — Step Across the Border
- European Cinema Society Lifetime Achievement Award — Andrzej Wajda
- European Cinema Society Special Award — Association of Filmmakers of the USSR
