= Elin Klinga =

Swedish actress (born 1969)

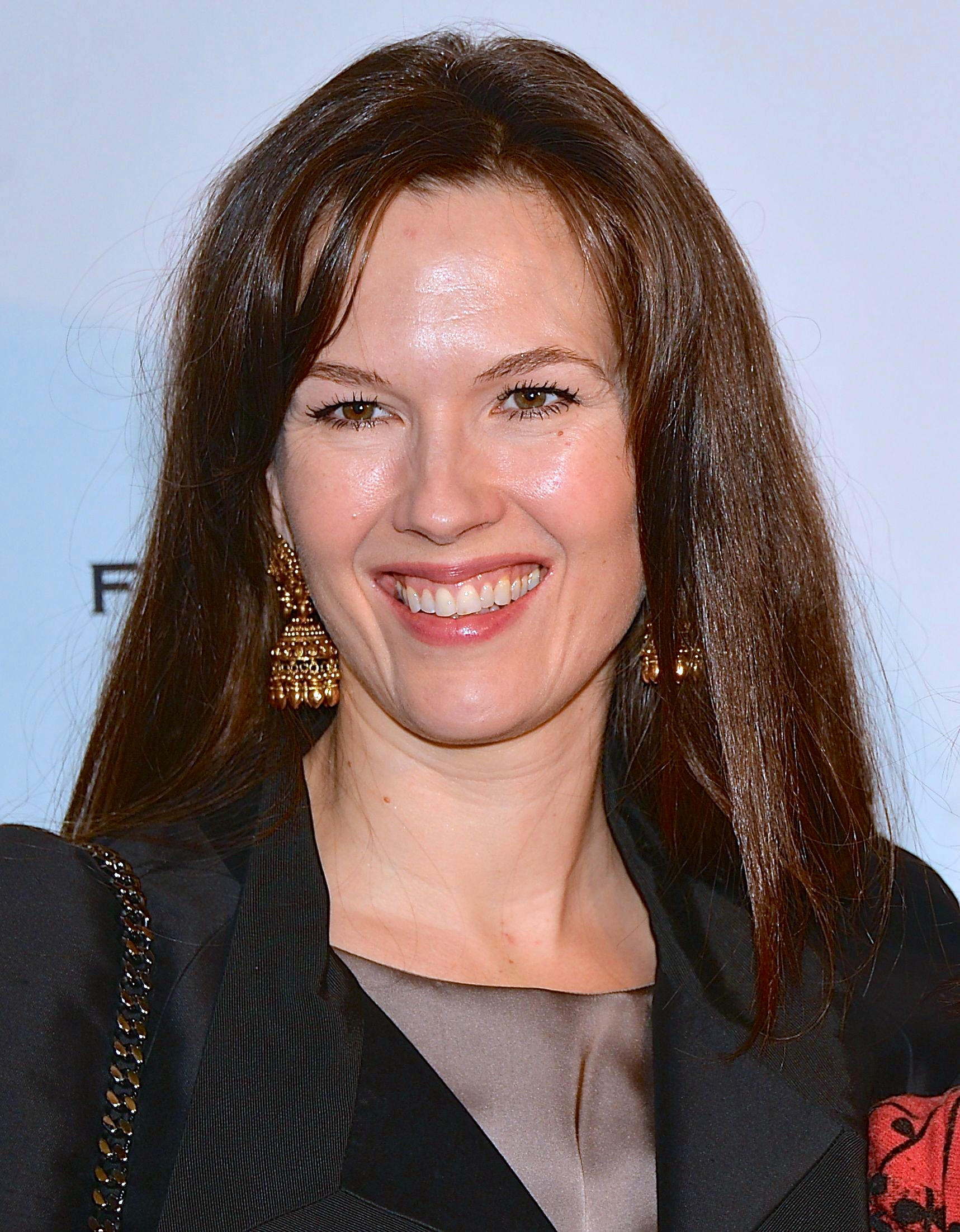
- Klinga in 2013
- Born: Elin Karin Klinga; 13 August 1969 (age 57); Stockholm, Sweden
- Occupation: Actress
- Years active: 1994–present
- Spouse: Fredrik Hillelson (m. 2013)
- Children: 1
- Parent(s): Hans Klinga; Malin Ek
- Relatives: Anders Ek (maternal grandfather); Birgit Cullberg (maternal grandmother); Mats Ek (uncle)

Elin Karin Klinga (born 13 August 1969) is a Swedish actress who took part in several of Ingmar Bergman's late stage productions. As a student Klinga attended the Adolf Fredrik's Music School in Stockholm. One of Bergman's favourite actresses, she starred in productions including The Image Makers (1998), The Ghost Sonata (2000) and Ghosts (2003).

She is the daughter of Hans Klinga.
