= Mamma (1982 film) =

1982 film

- Directed by: Suzanne Osten
- Written by: Tove Ellefsen; Suzanne Osten
- Produced by: Bert Sundberg
- Starring: Ewa Fröling
- Cinematography: Hans Welin
- Release date: 22 September 1982
- Running time: 91 minutes
- Country: Sweden
- Language: Swedish

Mamma (also released as Our Life Is Now) is a 1982 Swedish drama film directed by Suzanne Osten. Malin Ek won the award for Best Actress at the 19th Guldbagge Awards.

== Cast ==
- Malin Ek as Gerd
- Birgit Cullberg as Gerd som gammal
- Ida-Lotta Backman as Steffin Porquettas
- Iwa Boman as Barbro
- Hans V. Engström as Jan
- Kerstin Eriksson as Armélotta
