= Fanny and Alexander =

1982 film by Ingmar Bergman

- Original Swedish release poster
- Directed by: Ingmar Bergman
- Written by: Ingmar Bergman
- Produced by: Jörn Donner
- Starring: Pernilla Allwin; Bertil Guve; Jan Malmsjö; Börje Ahlstedt; Anna Bergman; Gunn Wållgren; Kristina Adolphson; Erland Josephson; Mats Bergman; Jarl Kulle
- Cinematography: Sven Nykvist
- Edited by: Sylvia Ingemarsson
- Music by: Daniel Bell
- Production companies: Cinematograph; Sveriges Television; Gaumont International; Personafilm; Tobis Film; Swedish Film Institute
- Distributed by: Sandrew Film & Teater (Sweden); Gaumont Distribution (France); Tobis Film (Germany)
- Release dates: 17 December 1982 (Sweden); 9 March 1983 (France); 8 October 1983 (West Germany)
- Running time: TV miniseries: 312 minutes; Theatrical film: 188 minutes
- Countries: Sweden; France; West Germany
- Languages: Swedish; German
- Budget: US$6 million
- Box office: US$6.7 million

Fanny and Alexander (Swedish: Fanny och Alexander) is a 1982 period drama film written and directed by Ingmar Bergman. The plot focuses on two siblings and their large family in Uppsala, (Note: Critic Roger Ebert observed the town in the film is unnamed. However, some publications refer to it as Bergman's own hometown Uppsala. Frank Gado suggests that "though not identified by name," the town is "unmistakably Uppsala.") Sweden during the first decade of the twentieth century. Following the death of the children's father (Allan Edwall), their mother (Ewa Fröling) remarries a prominent bishop (Jan Malmsjö) who becomes abusive towards Alexander for his vivid imagination.

Bergman intended Fanny and Alexander to be his final picture before retiring, and his script is semi-autobiographical. The characters Alexander, Fanny and stepfather Edvard are based on himself, his sister Margareta and his father Erik Bergman, respectively. Many of the scenes were filmed on location in Uppsala. The documentary film The Making of Fanny and Alexander was made simultaneously with the feature and chronicles its production.

The production was originally conceived as a television miniseries and cut in that version, spanning 312 minutes. A 188-minute cut version was created later for cinematic release, although this version was in fact the one to be released first. The television version has since been released as a complete film, and both versions have been shown in theaters throughout the world. The 312-minute cut is one of the longest cinematic films in history.

The theatrical version was released to universal critical acclaim. It won four Academy Awards, including for Best Foreign Language Film; three Guldbagge Awards, including Best Film; and other honours. Fanny and Alexander was followed by stage adaptations and further semi-autobiographical screenplays by Bergman, released as films in 1992: The Best Intentions, directed by Bille August, and Sunday's Children, directed by Daniel Bergman. On both review websites Rotten Tomatoes and Metacritic it is the highest-rated film of the 1980s, and has since then been regarded as one of Bergman's finest works, one of the greatest works of Swedish cinema, and of all time.

== Plot ==
In 1907, young Alexander, his sister Fanny, and their well-to-do family, the Ekdahls, live in a Swedish town, running a moderately profitable theatre. At Christmastime, the Ekdahls hold a Nativity play and later a large lively Christmas party. The siblings' parents, Emilie and Oscar, are happily married, with Oscar managing the theatre on behalf of the matriarch, Helena Ekdahl. Helena, a widow, reminisces humorously with long-time family friend, Isak Jacobi, about the time her husband caught them in flagrante delicto in an embrace, fondly remembering how their friendships endured. The siblings' womanizing uncle, Gustav Adolf, carries on with the nursemaid, Maj, with the forbearance of his wife, Alma, who jokes with the women in the family about her husband’s latest fling. The siblings' other uncle, Carl, privately bemoans himself humorlessly as a failure to his tolerant wife, Lydia. The joyful Christmas festivities at the Ekdahls abruptly end when Oscar suddenly dies from a stroke.

Shortly thereafter, Emilie marries Edvard Vergérus, the local bishop and a widower, who supported Emilie in her deep grief, advantageously pressing his suit. Emilie and her children move into the Vergérus home where he lives with his mother, sister, aunt, and maids. The children's stepfather, the bishop Edvard, soon reveals himself to be a strict and controlling authoritarian. The relationship between the bishop and Alexander is especially cold, as Alexander invents stories, for which Edvard punishes him severely. Quickly realizing her mistake, Emilie asks for a divorce, which Edvard will not consent to; though she may leave the marriage, this would be legally considered desertion, placing the children in his custody. Meanwhile, the rest of the Ekdahl family has begun to worry about their condition, and Emilie secretly visits her former mother-in-law, Helena, revealing she is pregnant.

During Emilie's absence, Edvard confines the children to their bedroom, ostensibly for their safety. There, Alexander shares a story, claiming he was visited by the ghosts of the Vergérus children, who revealed the bishop was responsible for their deaths. The maid Justina reports the story to Edvard, who responds with corporal punishment. After Emilie returns, the Ekdahl family friend, Isak Jacobi, helps smuggle the children from the house. They live temporarily with Isak and his nephews in their store.

Emilie's former brothers-in-law confront Edvard to negotiate a divorce, using the children, the bishop's debts, and the threat of a public scandal for leverage, but Edvard is unmoved. Emilie, now in the later stages of her pregnancy and still living with Vergérus, refuses to restore the children to Edvard's home. Emilie manipulates Edvard into drinking a large dosage of her bromide sedative from her cup. As the medication takes effect, she explains to him that she intends to flee the home as he sleeps. He drowsily threatens to follow her family and ruin their lives but falls unconscious. After Emilie escapes, Edvard's dying Aunt Elsa accidentally overturns a gas lamp, setting her bedclothes, nightgown, and hair on fire. Engulfed in flames, she runs through the house, seeking Edvard's help, but he, too, is set aflame. Although partially incapacitated by the sedative, he disentangles himself from Aunt Elsa, but he is badly burned and dies shortly thereafter.

Alexander had fantasised about his stepfather's death while living with Isak and his nephews, Aron and Ismael Retzinsky. The mysterious Ismael explains that fantasy can become true as he dreams it.

The Ekdahl family reunites for the christening celebration of Emilie's and the late bishop's daughter as well as the extra-marital daughter of Alexander's uncle, Gustav Adolf, and the maid, Maj. Alexander encounters the ghost of the bishop who knocks him to the floor, and tells him, "You can never escape me." Emilie, having inherited the theatre, hands Helena a copy of August Strindberg's play A Dream Play to read and tells her that they should perform it together onstage. Initially scoffing at the idea and declaring Strindberg a "misogynist," Helena takes to the idea and begins reading it to a sleeping Alexander.

== Cast ==
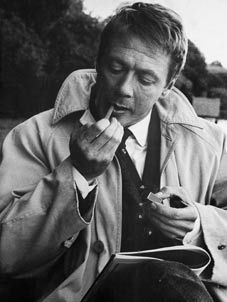
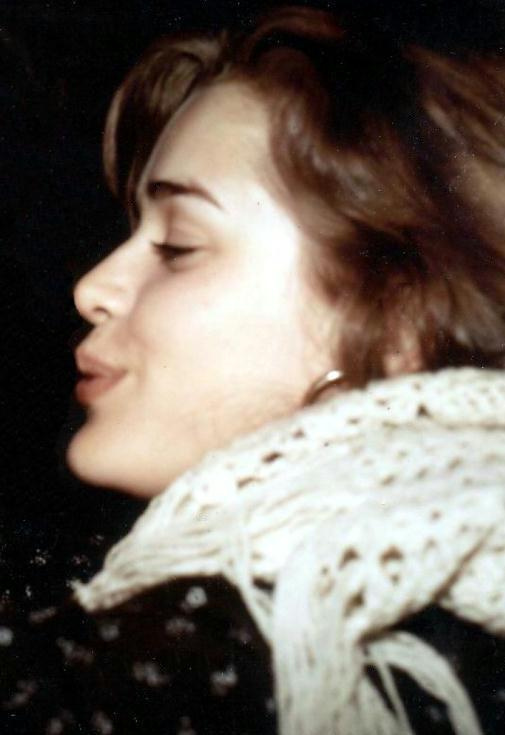
Allan Edwall and Ewa Fröling star as parents Oscar and Emilie Ekdahl.

The cast consists of:

Ekdahl house

- Gunn Wållgren as Helena Ekdahl (grandmother)
- Jarl Kulle as Gustav Adolf Ekdahl
- Mona Malm as Alma Ekdahl (Gustav's wife)
- Angelica Wallgren as Eva Ekdahl (Gustav and Alma's daughter)
- Maria Granlund as Petra
- Kristian Almgren as Putte
- Emelie Werkö as Jenny
- Allan Edwall as Oscar Ekdahl
- Ewa Fröling as Emilie Ekdahl (Oscar's wife)
- Bertil Guve as Alexander Ekdahl
- Pernilla Allwin as Fanny Ekdahl
- Börje Ahlstedt as Carl Ekdahl
- Christina Schollin as Lydia Ekdahl (Carl's wife)
- Sonya Hedenbratt as Aunt Emma
- Käbi Laretei as Aunt Anna von Bohlen
- Majlis Granlund as Miss Vega
- Svea Holst as Miss Ester
- Kristina Adolphson as Siri
- Siv Ericks as Alida
- Inga Ålenius as Lisen
- Eva von Hanno as Berta
- Pernilla August as Maj
- Lena Olin as Rosa
- Gösta Prüzelius as Dr. Fürstenberg
- Hans Strååt as priest
- Carl Billquist as Jespersson, police officer
- Axel Düberg as witness
- Olle Hilding as priest in the epilogue

Bishop's house

- Jan Malmsjö as Bishop Edvard Vergérus
- Kerstin Tidelius as Henrietta Vergérus
- Hans Henrik Lerfeldt as Elsa Bergius
- Marianne Aminoff as Blenda Vergerus
- Harriet Andersson as Justina
- Linda Krüger as Pauline
- Pernilla Wahlgren as Esmeralda
- Peter Stormare as young man

Jacobi's house

- Erland Josephson as Isak Jacobi
- Stina Ekblad as Ismael Retzinsky
- Mats Bergman as Aron Retzinsky
- Gerd Andersson as Japanese woman

Theatre

- Gunnar Björnstrand as Filip Landahl
- Heinz Hopf as Tomas Graal
- Sune Mangs as Mr Salenius
- Nils Brandt as Mr Morsing
- Per Mattsson as Mikael Bergman
- Anna Bergman as Hanna Schwartz
- Lickå Sjöman as Grete Holm
- Ernst Günther as Rector Magnificus
- Hugo Hasslo as the singer

== Production ==
=== Development ===
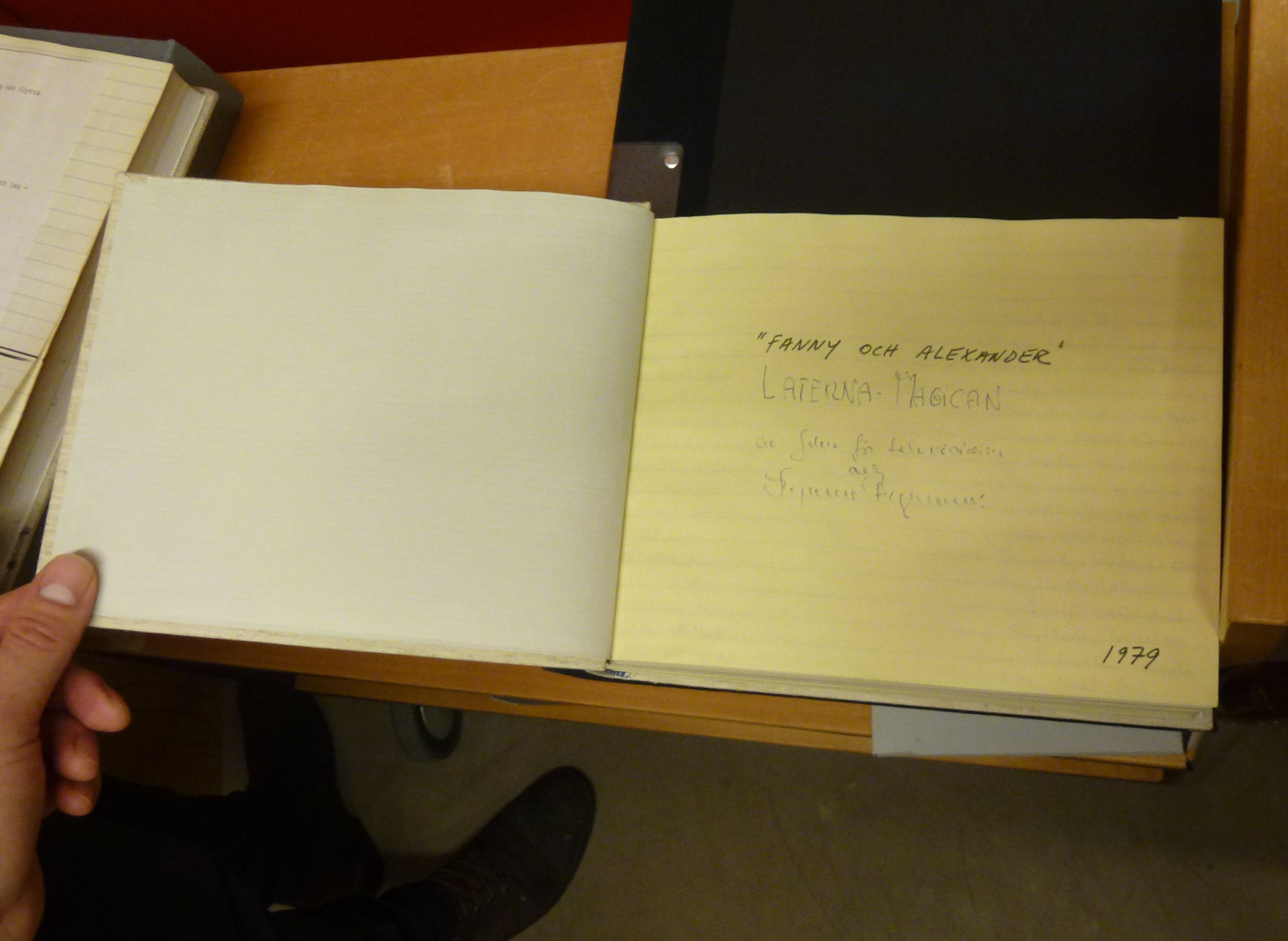
Bergman's screenplay

Director Ingmar Bergman conceived of Fanny and Alexander while working on his 1980 film From the Life of the Marionettes, and wrote the screenplay at Fårö in summer 1979. Bergman intended Fanny and Alexander to be his last feature film, but he wrote several screenplays afterwards and directed for television. He told the press he decided to retire, because, "I don't have the strength any more, neither psychologically nor physically". The screenplay was semi-autobiographical, attempting to portray Bergman's fondest memories in what he called a "happy and privileged" childhood; Alexander himself was meant as a representation of the young Ingmar. His recollections of his grandmother's home were a particular inspiration. He commented on his boyhood:

It was difficult to differentiate between what was fantasy and what was considered real. If I made an effort, I was perhaps able to make reality stay real. But, for instance, there were ghosts and specters. What should I do with them? And the sagas, were they real?

Bergman also recalled receiving his own magic lantern at age 10, from his aunt; in his autobiography, he described it as personally significant, and previously depicted a magic lantern in his 1972 Cries and Whispers.

However, the Ekdahls do not entirely match the Bergmans. Ingmar's relationship with his sister Margareta during their shared childhood is depicted through the character Fanny, who is included in the title though she is not as large a character as Alexander. Bergman had previously modeled characters after his mother, Karin Åkerblom, as simultaneously "virgin and seductress": Emilie also fits that self-contradictory design. (Note: Bergman also intended his 1972 Cries and Whispers as a "portrait of my mother ... the great beloved of my childhood". All four female Cries and Whispers protagonists are meant to represent different aspects of her personality.)

Margareta and Ingmar's father was the strict Erik Bergman, a Lutheran pastor. Edvard is based on Erik, and like Edvard, Erik was raised in a family almost completely made up of women. Erik and Ingmar also often conflicted over "truth" and honesty, much as Edvard and Alexander do. The story Alexander tells of being sold to a circus resembles one Ingmar had told as a boy, and he was accosted by Erik much as Edvard lectures Alexander. However, Bergman also stated that "It has been suggested ... that 12-year-old Alexander is my alter-ego. But this is not quite true. Fanny and Alexander is a story, the chronicle of a middle-class, perhaps upper-middle-class family sticking closely together ... There's a lot of me in the Bishop, rather than in Alexander. He is haunted by his own devils".

Bergman proposed the project to producer Jörn Donner, who said he could provide the budget if all production and costume design crew would be Swedish. Bergman initially doubted that Sweden alone had the manpower, but eventually caved, Donner said. The estimated budget of 40 million SEK made it the most costly Swedish film ever. To raise the $6 million, Donner and the Swedish Film Institute partnered with the French company Gaumont and West German TV. Bergman completed the screenplay by October 1980 and assembled a budget of $7 million, according to New York.

=== Casting ===
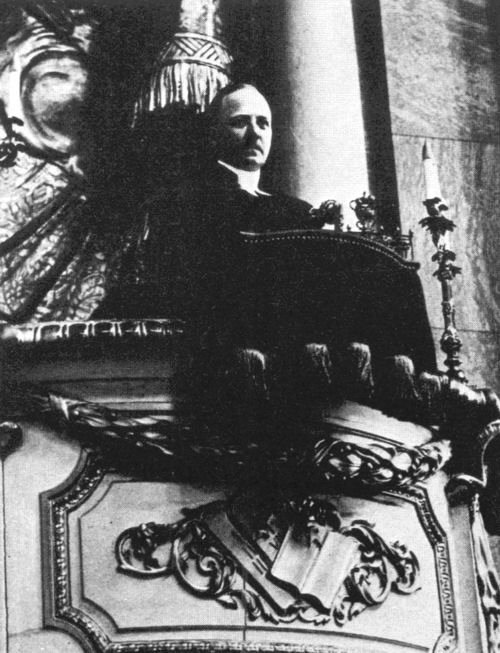
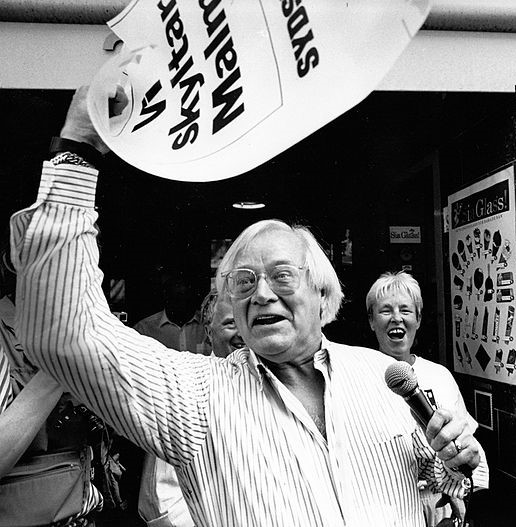
Ingmar Bergman's father Erik Bergman (left) provided the inspiration for the character Edvard, played by Jan Malmsjö (right).

The project was announced in October 1980 with Liv Ullmann, Max von Sydow and Erland Josephson in lead roles; von Sydow was cast as Edvard, the bishop who Ingmar told the press resembled Erik Bergman. However, negotiations to secure von Sydow became troubled as he continued to act more in productions beyond Sweden, and as his agent demanded a larger salary. Edvard was recast with Jan Malmsjö, whom Bergman had worked with before in Scenes from a Marriage. In 1981, Ullmann also rejected the role of Emilie, due to a scheduling conflict, though in 2013 she remarked "I still don't know why I did that". (Note: Before the director's death in 2007, Ullmann starred in 11 of his works and became known as his muse. Roger Ebert remarked Bergman and Ullmann's "lives have been intertwined since Persona, and that's been the most important fact in ... [Ullmann's] artistic life", and they also had a daughter, Linn Ullmann.)

Bertil Guve was 10 when cast as Alexander. Bergman had seen Guve in a television film by Lasse Hallström and called for an audition with Guve, though the boy did not know who Bergman was. Bergman ultimately cast Guve, without sharing the story of Fanny and Alexander with him, recognising his imagination when he told a story about killing his own grandfather during the audition. Guve also said, "I asked Ingmar later why he chose me. He said it was because I acted with my eyes". Child actress Pernilla Allwin was cast as Fanny, and she and Guve regarded each other as rivals when they first met and began working; Bergman identified with this sibling rivalry.

Other actors, like Harriet Andersson, Gunnar Björnstrand, and Jarl Kulle, had previously appeared in Bergman's filmography. Björnstrand was developing Alzheimer's syndrome, making it difficult for him to memorise his dialogue, but he was still awarded a small role. Veteran actress Gunn Wållgren was cast as Helena, despite the fact that she was suffering from cancer, often concealing her pain during shots. Fanny and Alexander marked the final film appearances of both Björnstrand and Wållgren.

Pernilla Wallgren (later August) was cast, out of a state school where she was studying the stage, for what became her breakthrough role. August later explained she received a message inviting her to read the screenplay, and she did not know how the filmmakers knew of her. She had developed an interest in acting after seeing Bergman's Cries and Whispers, and wanted a part like Kari Sylwan's in a film one day. Bergman also cast some of his real-life children, including Mats Bergman as Isak's nephew Aron, and Anna Bergman as Hanna Schwartz; Linn Ullmann was to play Alexander's older sister Amanda, but when Linn's school refused to give her a break for production, her father cut the character. His ex-wife Käbi Laretei was cast as an aunt. In total, there were 60 characters with lines, and over 1,200 extras.

=== Pre-production ===
Art director Anna Asp was given six months before production to prepare, and started by building miniature models and drawing sets. In creating the Ekdahl home, Bergman envisioned his real-life grandmother's Uppsala residence as a model. She had one apartment in the residence, whereas the other apartment belonged to Erik Bergman and his family. Asp designed Oscar and Emilie's apartment with an Art Nouveau style. For the bishop's house, Asp sought a design that would be frightening while still being a plausible home for a man of the church, and found inspiration from a photograph of a castle in a magazine. In designing Isak's residence, Asp worked from Bergman's memory of a Jewish antiques shop owner, looking for a labyrinth-style.

Costume designer Marik Vos oversaw a project requiring 250 costumes for the principal actors, along with over 1,000 costumes for the extras. She allowed the testing of the vast majority of fabric samples to determine how they appeared in photography, with Bergman demanding to see as many of the test shots as he could. Vos also co-ordinated colours with Asp.

=== Filming ===
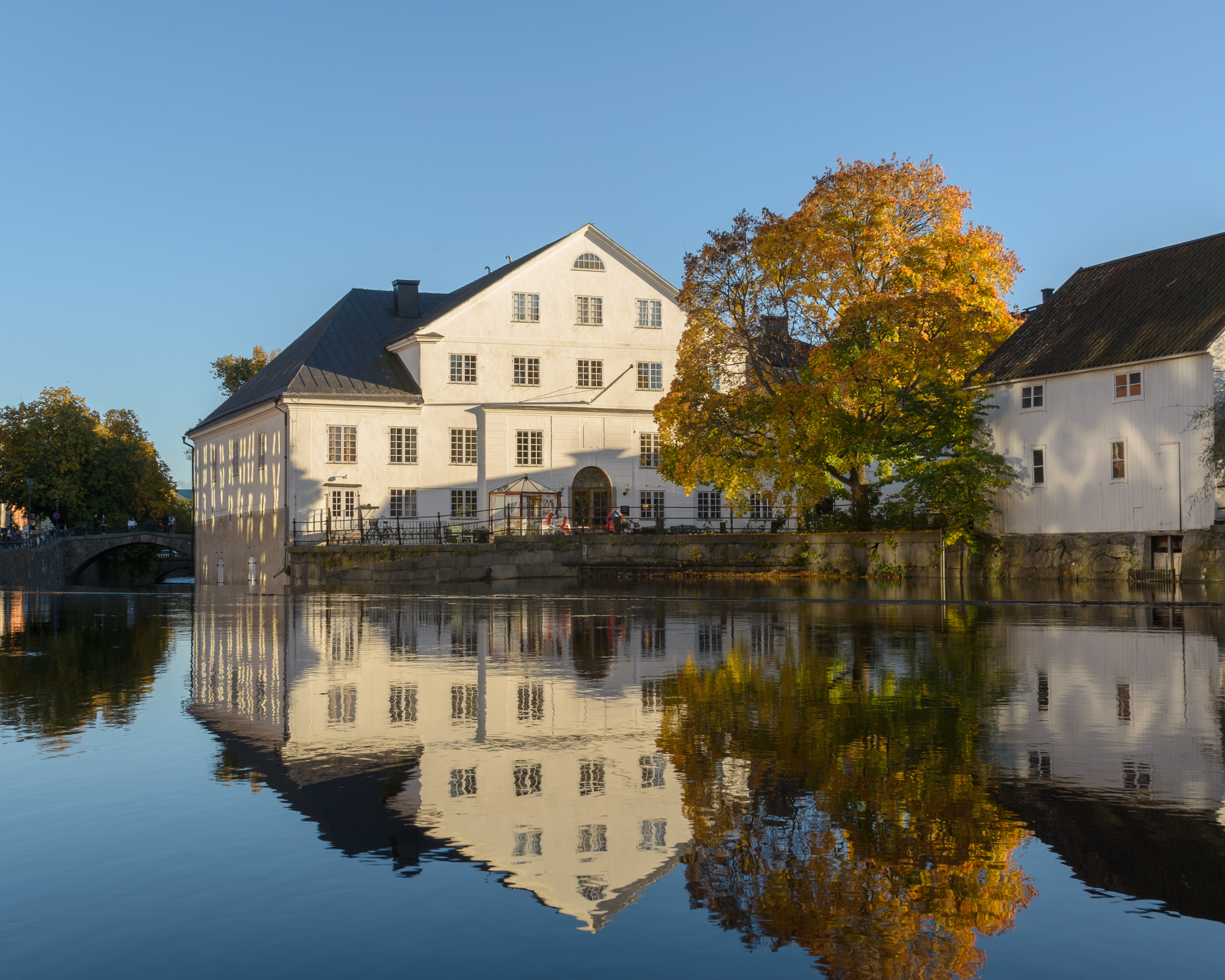
Upplandsmuseet was used as a location.

Principal photography began in Uppsala, Sweden, lasting from 7 September 1981 to 22 March 1982. The filmmakers began shooting around Uppsala streets, which municipal leaders allowed the crew to redecorate. Scenes were shot in chronological order, and Guve only learned the thrust of the story was his conflict with his stepfather during production. On the first day of photography, Bergman decided to stage a pillow fight, which the apprehensive Wallgren credited for putting her at ease. It also endeared the director to the child actors. Guve developed a generally amiable relationship with Bergman and later Pernilla Allwin, and Allwin and Guve's habit of playing on bicycles between filming would dirty their costumes and cause the crew to rush to clean them. Guve also conflicted with Bergman when he laughed during a shoot, at which point Bergman reprimanded him and said that it was "the most outrageous, the most unprofessional behaviour" he had ever seen. While production meant full-time days during the workweek, Guve remained in school by spending the weekend on homework.

Scenes were shot outside of Uppsala Cathedral, with the crew conflicting with the dean over whether an antenna could be removed. For Edvard's house, shooting moved to Upplandsmuseet, Uppsala County's museum. For interiors, the same sets in Uppsala and the Swedish Film Institute were used to portray multiple places.

With Bergman suffering from influenza, his colleagues substituted for him in shooting Oscar's funeral scene with 500 extras and a brass band. At one point during production, a crossbeam fell over in the studio and nearly hit Bergman and cinematographer Sven Nykvist (who still said this film contained his favorite cinematography). Other crew were injured in workplace accidents. One injury took place when a male stunt performer portraying the burning Aunt Elsa was actually burned by spilled napalm. Much of the production was recorded by Bergman and Arne Carlsson for the 1984 documentary, The Making of Fanny and Alexander.

== Themes and interpretations ==
Critic Michiko Kakutani identified Fanny and Alexander as sharing marriage-drama and domestic themes as his Thirst (1949), Scenes from a Marriage (1973) and From the Life of the Marionettes. In contrast, academic Linda Haverty expressed surprise at Bergman, including his use of fantastical elements such as ghosts and telepathy as they were a departure from the psychological horror of his work in the 1960s and 1970s, for this Bildungsroman story. Professor Frank Gado argued in his 1986 book The Passion of Ingmar Bergman that Fanny and Alexander is "actually two films, which, except that they concern members of the same family, are dramatically separate entities. The glow that warmed audiences radiates from only an outer layer; its core is as chilling as any of Bergman's fictions".

=== Magic and reality ===
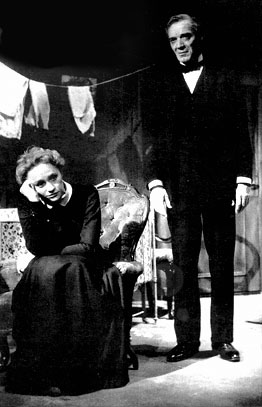
Gunn Wållgren in Strindberg's A Dream Play, 1955.

Academic Egil Törnqvist identified the character Gustav Adolf with secular merriment, while Alexander and Isak inhabit a world filled with the supernatural and evil. Critic Dave Kehr interpreted the fairy tale style as a product of the story being told from Alexander's perspective, coloured with "myth and legend". Alexander experiences "visions of ghosts or dream visions alongside everyday reality", author Laura Hubner wrote. The sequence these visions are seen in may be significant. After being punished by Edvard for telling a story about how the Vergérus family died, Alexander is haunted by the ghosts of the family who deny Edvard's culpability, suggesting Edvard frightened Alexander into seeing this new vision. Writer Mas'ud Zavarzadeh rationalised Alexander's visions as a product of the character being "an artist in the making". Zavarzadeh further noted, "He is involved in the construction of a more genuine and stable reality than the one that surrounds him".

As indicated by Gustav Adolf's final speech, most of the Ekdahls do not spend much time grappling with the meaning of life. (Note: Gustav Adolf states: "We Ekdahls have not come into the world to see through it, never think that. We are not equipped for such excursions. We might just as well ignore the big things. [...] Suddenly, the storm howls and disaster is upon us [...] So it shall be. Therefore, let us be happy while we're happy, let's be kind, generous, affectionate, and good. Therefore it is necessary, and not in the least shameful, to take pleasure in the little world, good food, gentle smiles, fruit trees in bloom, Waltzes".) Zavarzadeh also contrasted Alexander to another of his uncles, Carl, a scholar who relies on logic but who is reduced to an absurdity, at one point entertaining the children with his flatulence. Törnqvist considered the surname of the characters to be inspired by Henrik Ibsen's 1884 play The Wild Duck, and that it made the name Ekdal synonymous with characters who cope with illusions about reality. Fanny and Alexander adds an H to Ekdal, giving it an aristocratic air, Törnqvist added.

Huber cited academics Marilyn Johns Blackwell and Törnqvist in support of the point that, despite the title, Alexander is the lead role and Fanny is a minor character; Blackwell added that imagination is "largely gendered as male". Concurring that Fanny is a minor character, Kehr further argued that Alexander influences the plot to a lesser degree than the adult characters, but remains the focus in the storytelling.

On Alexander's visions and their reality, critic Roger Ebert argued:

Fanny and Alexander is above all the story of what Alexander understands is really happening. If magic is real, if ghosts can walk, so be it. Bergman has often allowed the supernatural into his films. In another sense, the events in Fanny and Alexander may be seen through the prism of the children's memories, so that half-understood and half-forgotten events have been reconstructed into a new fable that explains their lives.

In the end, Helena reads from August Strindberg's 1902 play A Dream Play: "Anything can happen, all is possible and probable. Time and space do not exist. On an insignificant foundation of reality, imagination spins out and weaves new patterns". As with A Dream Play, Fanny and Alexander explores "the unreality of life itself". Gado suggested the quote refers to memories and imagination, and that all of Bergman's filmography could be dreams forming parts of one dream.

=== Family conflict ===
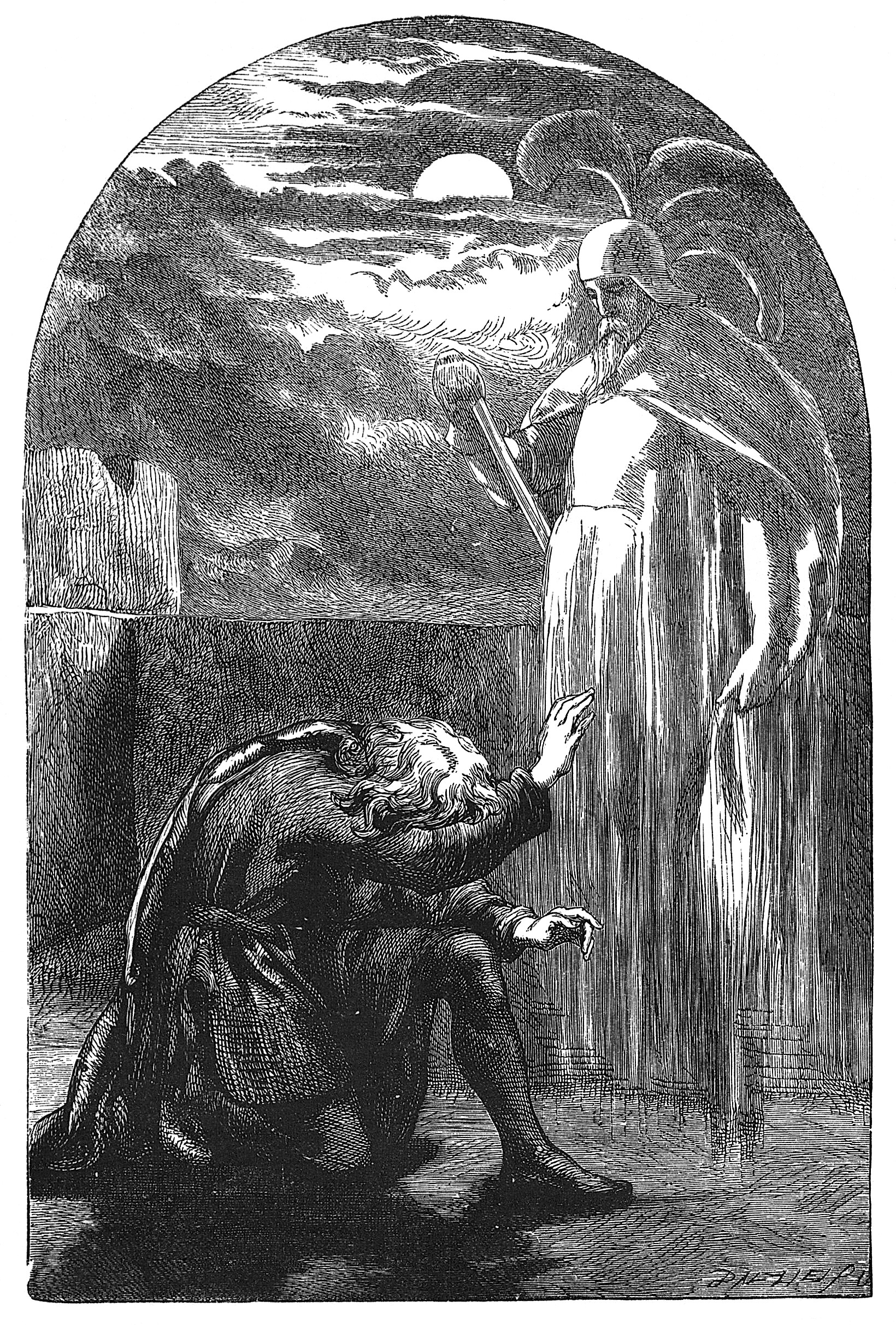
The story references Shakespeare's Hamlet and its Ghost, played by Oscar.

Film Quarterly essayist Jarrod Hayes concluded the conflict between Alexander and Edvard is a "clash of two Titans", as Edvard summons "the power of an image, God, Alexander has the power of the Image". Törnqvist observed Alexander's father Oscar wears white while his stepfather Edvard wears black, signifying they represent good and evil. Academic Amir Cohen-Shalev also observed contrasts between Oscar and Edvard, Oscar as "well-meaning, loving but passive", and Edvard, as a far more strict man of the church, in the mold of Erik Bergman. Cohen-Shalev argued Edvard disguises his emotional shortcomings with his bourgeois veneer and "glib, affected piety". While espousing his devotion, Edvard personally may have secretly lost his belief, and he conflicts with Alexander with "doublethink": using "love" to mean "hate". Following Oscar's death, Cohen-Shalev argued Emilie chooses to marry Edvard because she is frightened as to how empty she is: "I could not understand why nothing really happened, why I never felt really happy".

The story makes multiple references to William Shakespeare's play Hamlet; According to Scott-Douglas, Alexander observes Oscar playing Hamlet's ghost before he dies, and afterward appears as a ghost, while Alexander acquires a new abusive stepfather. This made "theatre and reality seem indistinguishable". Cohen-Shalev argued Oscar being reduced to a ghost is his punishment for never truly living, and losing his life. Törnqvist wrote the "triangle" of Alexander, Emilie and Edvard is explicitly explained with Emilie's reference to Hamlet, and the characters Hamlet, Queen Gertrude and King Claudius: "Don't act Hamlet, my son. I'm not Queen Gertrude, your kind stepfather is no king of Denmark, and this is not Elsinore Castle, even if it does look gloomy". Emilie, like Gertrude, is also portrayed as unfaithful, with Bergman's screenplay suggesting Oscar is not Alexander's biological father: in the Nativity play, Oscar plays Joseph. According to Helena, Oscar fell impotent after Fanny's birth, and Emilie afterward conducted circumspect affairs.

By framing Edvard as "stepfather-king", the story becomes a battle between "infanticide and parricide", where killing Edvard is associated with Alexander's "artistic/sexual emancipation", scholar Arnold L. Weinstein wrote. Törnqvist wrote Alexander displays an "erotic attraction to his mother", combined with a hatred for his stepfather, referencing the Oedipus complex. Author Viveka Nyberg identified Oedipal themes as pervasive, suggesting Alexander believes he may have killed both his father and stepfather in competition for his mother's love. Nyberg described Emilie as "beautiful and aloof in equal measure", and she cares for her children but concerns herself more with other things. Alexander's story of being sold to the circus reflects his feelings of his mother forsaking him. While Alexander appears to admire Oscar and his imagination, Alexander also listens in on his parents' interactions, and sleeps in Maj's bed, with Maj acting as stand-in mother and an object of sexual desire.

Cohen-Shalev described cyclical patterns in the story: the family endures seasons of distinct "symbols, myths, and moods", including death in winter and resurrections in the spring; or, a trip to which the protagonist experiences a test in the "Valley of Tears" before achieving "blissful family unification". Edvard is also forgiven with "a kind of humanity", Cohen-Shalev wrote, as Edvard confesses his faith is a mask, and his burning death mirrors his analogy of a mask that cannot be removed unless the flesh is removed as well.

=== Christianity and Judaism ===
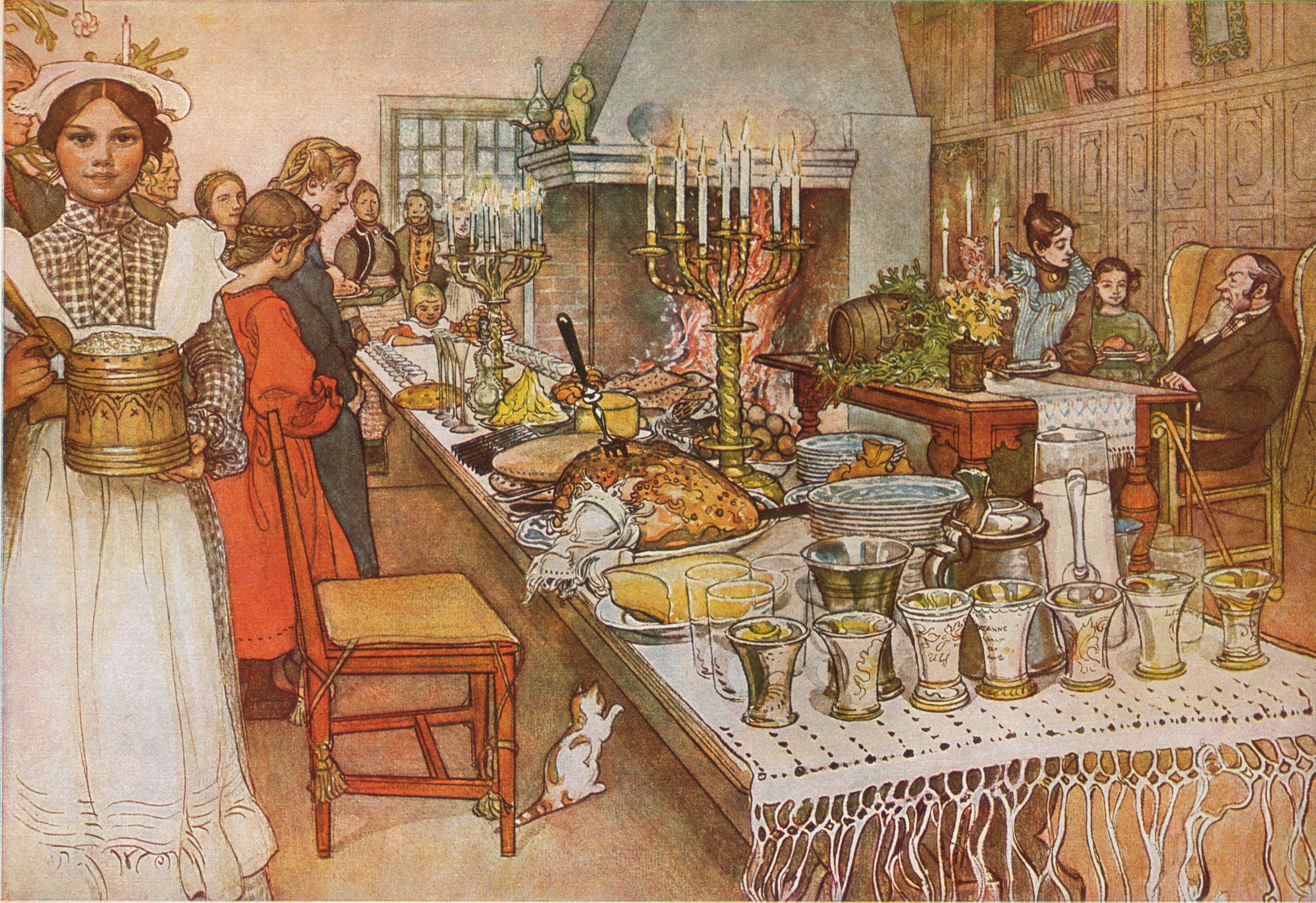
Carl Larsson's Julaftonen, a depiction of the Swedish Christmas in the 1900s

The story opens with exploring celebrations of the Swedish Christmas, which is expressed through "colors, sounds, movements, music" that Cineaste critic Royal Brown called "life-affirming, pagan Christianity". This is starkly contrasted with Edvard's Christianity, which is dictated by asceticism, authoritarianism and concern with death, with Alexander finding his new home a bare, cold prison. Professor Freddie Rokem wrote that, in contrast to Edvard's "rigorous and sterile" Protestantism, the Ekdahl Christmas party can include the Jewish Isak, as he is a dear friend of matriarch Helena Ekdahl, and this friendship is "utopian". While at Isak's, his nephew Aron Retzinsky brings out a puppet of God, or deus ex machina to which Alexander reacts with terror; he then tries to play down that fear, and is left to wonder how seriously to take the supernatural. Author Harry Perridon argued that when Alexander declares God "is a shit", he means God in Christianity, associating the deity with suffering in the world. After this point, true miracles in Bergman's universe have to come from a different source, Perridon wrote.

The depiction of Jews in Sweden revolves around Isak, which academic Rochelle Wright argues is "far more nuanced" than in Bergman's previous The Touch (1971). Isak is not completely assimilated, but his presence in Sweden is presented as positive, as he stands for imagination, "magic and mystery", Wright wrote. Erland Josephson, who played Isak, described his performance as a stereotyped portrayal of a Jew, but with mystical and tragic elements, drawing on Jewish people and their history. Hayes argued that with its take on "time and space", the story hinted at Jewish mysticism and the Kabbalah. The light that engulfs Isak when he screams after being beaten by Edvard calls on the light of the Kabbalah to vanquish evil, Hayes hypothesised. The scream may have invited "spiritual intervention", allowing the children's escape by rendering them invisible in Isak's trunk, while the children seemingly appear lying on the floor to Edvard. Törnqvist hypothesised that Jewish pantheism replaces Christian belief in "grace and punishment" in the story. Royal Brown argued that Isak's "cabbalistic magic and animism" is closer to the Ekdahls' Christianity than to Edvard's.

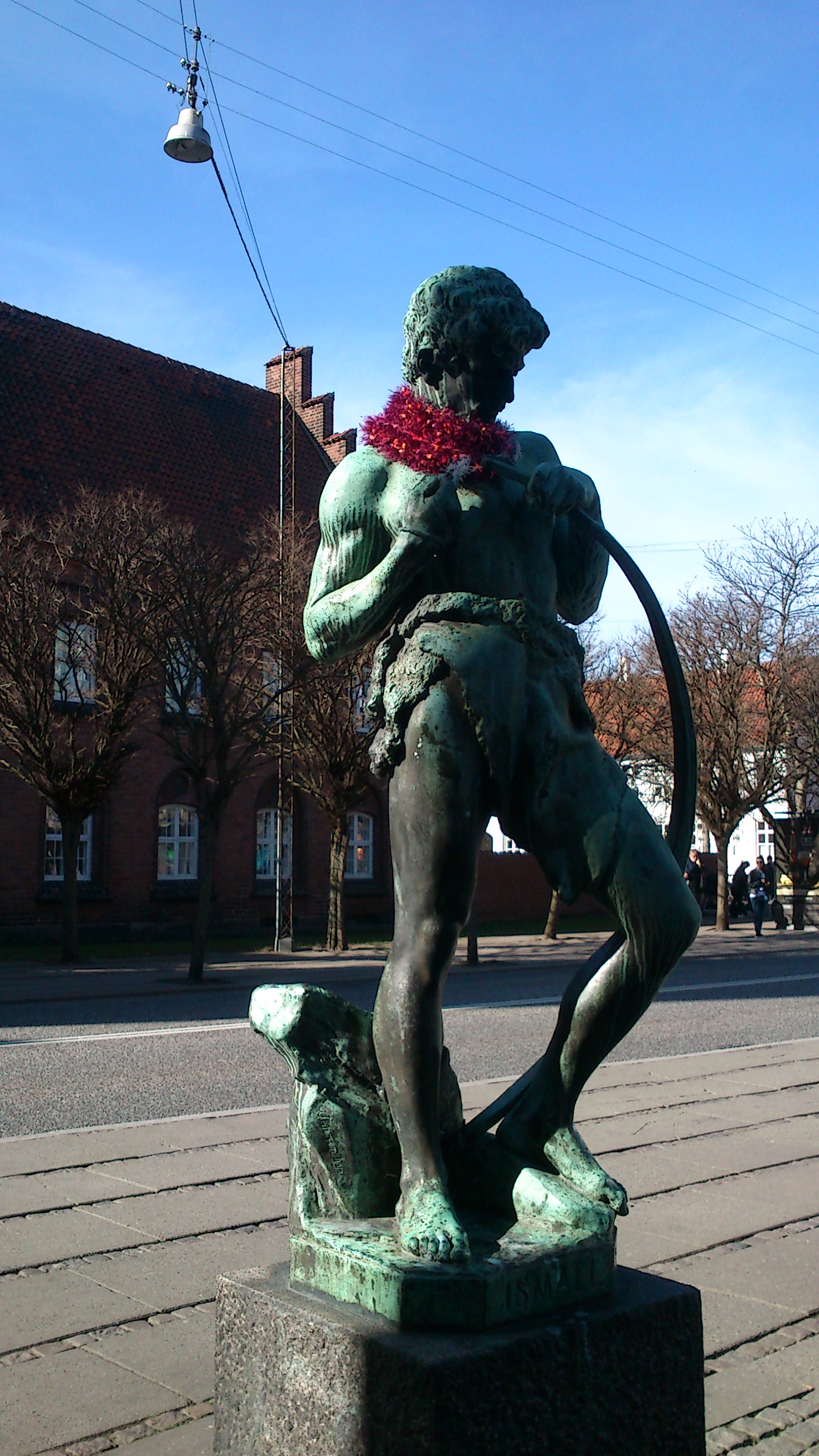
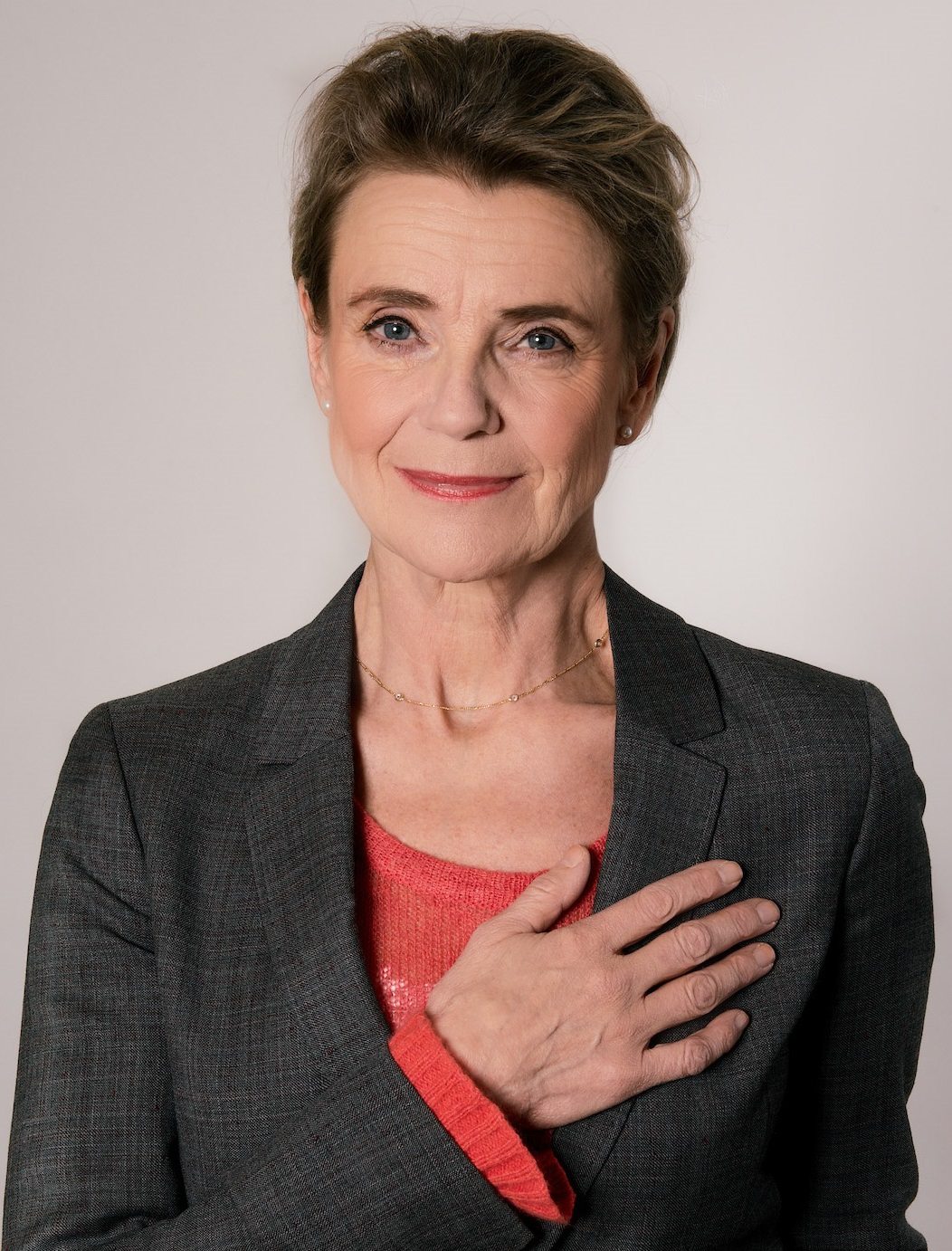
The Biblical Ishmael (depicted in statue by Hans Peder Pedersen-Dan) is the namesake of Ismael, played by Stina Ekblad.

Törnqvist identified Ismael as "one of the more enigmatic features" of Fanny and Alexander, commenting on the character as a fusion of elements. Ismael speaks the Finland-Swedish, and he is androgynous, being a male character played by a woman, Stina Ekblad. Ismael also says to Alexander, "Perhaps we are the same person". Author Daniel Humphrey also commented in Ismael's androgyny, conveying "queerness and foreignness" but presented as spiritually identical to Alexander. Additionally, Humphrey commented on the name, with Ishmael of the Bible being a bastard son of Abraham and progenitor of the Arab people, considered "paradigmatic" by Christians and Jews alike. A Dream Play author Strindberg had taken interest in the Ishmael character. Törnqvist also identified Ismael as matching Hamlet in education, intelligence, real or feigned insanity and anti-social nature.

Hayes commented on the way Ismael holds Alexander, remarking it was "Alexander's erotic encounter with a man/a woman/himself". Critic Robin Wood and Richard Lippe argued Ismael directly replaces Oscar, dismissed by Alexander as not serving a purpose; Ismael instead brings danger and sexual ambiguity: Wood and Lippe observed Ismael touching Alexander and kissing Aron. The role of Ismael and Alexander's ritual in Edvard's death is uncertain: Ismael speaks of what will happen in the future in describing Edvard's death, but it can all be logically explained, with a police officer informing Emilie the death is legally accidental.

== Release ==
Acts in the long version (Note: The first segment combines the Prologue and "The Ekdahl Family celebrates Christmas"; the second segment, combining acts "The Wraith" and "The Breakup", totals approximately 75 minutes; the third segment contains the act "The Summer's Events"; the fourth segment combines "The Demons" and Epilogue.)

Prologue

Familjen Ekdahl firar jul, The Ekdahl Family Celebrates Christmas

Vålnaden, The Wraith

Uppbrottet, The Breakup

Sommarens händelser, The Summer's Events

Demonerna, The Demons

Epilogue

While cinematic film stock was used in production, Bergman conceived of the presentation as a television miniseries, and there are different versions, presented as a miniseries and film. The longer version intended for television was the original. After completing production, Bergman had to edit the complete cut to 188 minutes for screenings in theatres, regretting losing much of the fantasy material. He remarked, "This was extremely troublesome, as I had to cut into the nerves and lifeblood of the film". The film premiered in Stockholm on 17 December 1982 in its 188-minute theatrical cut. Distribution rights were sold to 30 other countries in 1982. It subsequently opened in France on 9 March 1983, West Germany on 8 October 1983, and the United States on 17 June 1983.

The complete version runs 312 minutes. It was released in Swedish theatres in 1983, and screened at the 40th Venice International Film Festival in September 1983. (Note: At the festival where the five-hour Fanny and Alexander was screened, Bergman accepted the Golden Lion, though it was awarded for lifetime achievement rather than for Fanny and Alexander particularly, and had been announced at the 1982 Festival.) It subsequently aired as a miniseries on Sveriges Television in four segments, and five episodes of unequal length at Bergman's demand. They ran 92, 40, 37, 60 and 90 minutes, beginning 25 December 1984. After debuting at the Swedish Film Institute on 16 September 1984, The Making of Fanny and Alexander aired with a television repeat of Fanny and Alexander in Sweden on 18 August 1986. In 1991, the Guinness Book of World Records listed the five-hour version as among the longest films in history. The entire miniseries ran on SVT1 in Sweden on 2 August 2007, with 10-minute newscast interruption, rendering it a two-part version. The screenplay was also published as a book and translated into English in 1983.

In Region 2, Artificial Eye released the five-hour version on DVD in 2002. In 2011 in Region A, The Criterion Collection published a Blu-ray edition including the theatrical version, the television version, and The Making of Fanny and Alexander.

== Reception ==
=== Box office ===
There were large audiences in Sweden at showings of Fanny and Alexander, including at the five-hour cut, making it the most popular box-office film Bergman had in his native country. It had 374,208 admissions in France and 165,146 in Germany. This amounted to minimal presence in the French box-office.

Fanny and Alexander finished its run grossing $6,783,304 in North America. According to critic Vincent Canby's analysis, the film did "extremely well" and had its niche audience, but could not match summer blockbuster competition which dominated the top 15 spots in the box office, particularly Return of the Jedi. In 1992, Variety ranked it the 21st highest grossing foreign film in U.S. box office history, and the fifth-highest grossing Swedish film after 1967's I Am Curious (Yellow) and Elvira Madigan, Dear John (1964) and My Life as a Dog (1985).

=== Critical reception ===
Upon its release in the U.S. in 1983, the theatrical version of Ingmar Bergman's Fanny and Alexander generated a wealth of controversy. Bergman has always seemed to breed conflict among cineastes [...] but Fanny and Alexander, which the director announced as his final theatrical release, seemed to bring the critics out in even greater force, as though there were just the one remaining chance to be quoted on the subject. You either loved the film or hated it, and strong voices from the reviewing community lined up on either side.

— Rick Moody, The Criterion Collection

Upon release in Sweden, the film received generally positive reviews, with Expressen critic Lasse Bergström approving of the portrayal of the Oscarian era. Critic Stig Larsson assessed it as Bergman's ironic take on his past filmography. Jönköpings-Posten posted a positive review on 7 February 1983, followed by a second critic in the same paper accusing the film of creating false joy on 21 February. The film ranked 10th on Cahiers du Cinéma's Top 10 Films of the Year List in 1983.

Vincent Canby's contemporary review in The New York Times described it a "big, dark, beautiful, generous family chronicle"; Canby also praised the cast as "uniformly excellent". Roger Ebert awarded it four stars, assessing it as "a big, exciting, ambitious film", relatable to audiences though more specific in its story than Bergman's prior studies of faith and sex, and named it the 4th best film of 1983. Variety staff called it "a sumptuously produced period piece" blending "elegance with intimacy". For The Washington Post, Rita Kempley found the story more cheerful than past Bergman productions, highlighting Ewa Fröling and comparing her to Liv Ullmann. In The New York Times, Michiko Kakutani compared the film's "generosity of vision" to the comedies of William Shakespeare. The Nation critic Robert Hatch compared it to Shakespeare's The Tempest as a final life-affirming work, featuring "magic with the casual authority of Prospero himself". Kerry Brougher denied it was Bergman's magnum opus, but still said it was "a thoughtful, graceful, beautifully filmed work". National Review critic John Simon wrote a negative review, calling it "overstuffed", and expressing lack of interest in Fröling and Guve as newcomers to Bergman's filmography.

Ebert added it to his Great Movies list in 2004, hailing it as "astonishingly beautiful", crediting Sven Nykvist for "color and warmth". In 2010, The Guardian ranked the film eighth in its list of 25 greatest arthouse films. Reviewing The Criterion Collection Blu-ray, Andre Dellamorte wrote that despite the five-hour runtime, the story was uncomplicated but always interesting. The Observer quoted actor Matthew Macfadyen as saying the film "featured just the most extraordinary acting I'd ever seen". Macfadyen added that as a RADA student, the film was shown as "an example to follow – an example of people acting with each other". Polish film director Agnieszka Holland also praised it in 2012, saying both children and intellectuals could enjoy it and that it gives a very vivid portrait of another era. In his 2015 Movie Guide, Leonard Maltin gave it four stars, identifying its emotions as "exquisitely expressed".

Pauline Kael wrote a more mixed review, enjoying the merry atmosphere but writing the "conventionality" is "rather shocking", suggesting Bergman had moved to Victorian times to escape his usual eccentric viewpoints. The Guardian critic Alex Cox wrote a negative review in 2006, claiming there was no story for the first two of three hours, and that the analogy to Hamlet did not hold up as Alexander knows Edvard is evil, whereas Hamlet is uncertain if the Ghost is a demon and Claudius is innocent. Cox had not seen the longer version, but considered it might be better.

In 1990, Fanny and Alexander was named the best film of the 1980s by Los Angeles Times by Sheila Benson, who called it "generous, ribald, reflective and radiantly life-affirming", and Michael Wilmington, and the third best by Newsweek critic David Ansen. In 1996, Fanny and Alexander was ranked at No. 36 in Movieline Magazine's "100 Greatest Foreign Films". In 2004, The New York Times also included the film on its list of "the Best 1,000 Movies Ever Made". Xan Brooks, in The Guardian's Film Season, chose the film as the eighth "best arthouse film of all time". He described it as "an opulent family saga, by turns bawdy, stark and strange" with a rare abundance of "indelible supporting characters". In 2007, the film was ranked at No. 23 by The Guardian's readers' poll on its list of "40 greatest foreign films of all time". The film was Voted at No. 44 on the list of "100 Greatest Films" by the prominent French magazine Cahiers du cinéma in 2008. In the British Film Institute's 2012 Sight & Sound polls of the greatest films ever made, Fanny and Alexander was 84th among critics and 16th among directors. In the earlier 2002 version of the list, the film ranked 35th among critics and 19th among directors. Also in 2002, Sight and Sound magazine invited several critics to make a list of the best films of last 25 years and Fanny and Alexander was ranked at number three. In 2012 the film was voted at number five on the 25 best Swedish films of all-time list by a poll of 50 film critics and academics conducted by film magazine FLM. In 2018, the film was ranked 28th in BBC's list of The 100 greatest foreign language films. In 2022 edition of Sight & Sound's Greatest films of all time list the film ranked 53rd in the director's poll.

Fanny and Alexander has a 100% approval rating on Rotten Tomatoes, based on 45 reviews, with a weighted average of 9.6/10. The site's consensus reads: "Ingmar Bergman conveys the sweep of childhood with a fastidious attention to detail and sumptuous insight into human frailty in Fanny and Alexander, a masterwork that crystalizes many of the directors' preoccupations into a familial epic". On Metacritic, the film has a weighted average score of 100 out of 100 based on 8 critics, indicating "universal acclaim".

=== Accolades ===
The film received six Academy Award nominations, winning four, including Best Foreign Language Film. It also received the third highest number of nominations of 1984, after Terms of Endearment and The Right Stuff (both released in 1983). The four wins was the most any foreign-language film had received at the Academy Awards to date until it tied the record with Crouching Tiger, Hidden Dragon (2000), Parasite (2019) and All Quiet on the Western Front (2022). Fanny and Alexander marked the third and final time Bergman won Best Foreign Language Film, after The Virgin Spring (1960) and Through a Glass Darkly (1961). Bergman did not personally attend the ceremony, while working on a stage production in Munich, so his award was accepted by his wife Ingrid von Rosen and Jörn Donner. The film won the FIPRESCI Prize at 1983 Venice Film Festival. It also won the French Syndicate of Cinema Critics Award for Best Foreign Film.

Accolades for Fanny and Alexander
Award	Date of ceremony	Category	Recipient(s)	Result
Academy Awards	9 April 1984	Best Director	Ingmar Bergman	Nominated
Academy Awards	9 April 1984	Best Original Screenplay	Ingmar Bergman	Nominated
Academy Awards	9 April 1984	Best Foreign Language Film	Ingmar Bergman	Won
Academy Awards	9 April 1984	Best Art Direction	Anna Asp	Won
Academy Awards	9 April 1984	Best Cinematography	Sven Nykvist	Won
Academy Awards	9 April 1984	Best Costume Design	Marik Vos-Lundh	Won
BAFTA Awards	1984	Film Not in the English Language	Jörn Donner, Ingmar Bergman	Nominated
BAFTA Awards	1984	Best Cinematography	Sven Nykvist	Won
BAFTA Awards	1984	Best Costume Design	Marik Vos-Lundh	Nominated
César Awards	3 March 1984	Best Foreign Film	Ingmar Bergman	Won
David di Donatello Awards	1984	Best Foreign Film	Ingmar Bergman	Won
David di Donatello Awards	1984	Best Foreign Director	Ingmar Bergman	Won
David di Donatello Awards	1984	Best Foreign Screenplay	Ingmar Bergman	Won
Directors Guild of America	1983	Best Director	Ingmar Bergman	Nominated
Golden Globes	28 January 1984	Best Foreign Language Film	Ingmar Bergman	Won
Golden Globes	28 January 1984	Best Director - Motion Picture	Ingmar Bergman	Nominated
Guldbagge Awards	31 October 1983	Best Film	Ingmar Bergman	Won
Guldbagge Awards	31 October 1983	Best Director	Ingmar Bergman	Won
Guldbagge Awards	31 October 1983	Best Actor	Jarl Kulle	Won
Los Angeles Film Critics Association	17 December 1983	Best Foreign Language Film	Ingmar Bergman	Won
Los Angeles Film Critics Association	17 December 1983	Best Cinematography	Sven Nykvist	Won
National Board of Review	14 December 1983	Best Foreign Language Film	Ingmar Bergman	Won
National Board of Review	14 December 1983	Top Five Foreign Films	Ingmar Bergman	Won
New York Film Critics Circle	29 January 1984	Best Foreign Language Film	Ingmar Bergman	Won
New York Film Critics Circle	29 January 1984	Best Director	Ingmar Bergman	Won

== Legacy ==
After ostensibly retiring from directing, Bergman completed After the Rehearsal in 1984. (Note: Critic Robin Wood observed After the Rehearsal was a television production and Fanny and Alexander was announced as be his last cinematic work, though Fanny and Alexander was also made for television: "the distinctions blur", Wood wrote.) Bergman also conceived of a biographical project following his parents Erik and Karin Åkerblom, and in a press conference in August 1989, announced he planned a production that could be considered a follow-up to Fanny and Alexander and his 1987 autobiography The Magic Lantern. The resulting 1991–92 miniseries and film The Best Intentions was directed by Bille August and won the Palme d'Or at the 1992 Cannes Film Festival. Bergman selected Bille August as director on condition that Fanny and Alexander actress Pernilla Wallgren star as Bergman's mother; she did under the name Pernilla August. Critic Vincent Canby also identified Ingmar's screenplay Sunday's Children, directed by Daniel Bergman and released in 1992, as "a continuation" of Fanny and Alexander and The Best Intentions, and questioned if Ingmar had truly retired. Whereas Ingmar's recollections of Erik Bergman are damning in Fanny and Alexander, his study of his father is "far more forgiving" in The Best Intentions and Sunday's Children. (Note: Earlier with his 1963 film Winter Light, which had a clergyman protagonist, Bergman took the rare step of sharing the screenplay with Erik Bergman, and boasted that Erik read it three times. Ingmar was possibly trying to communicate that he understood Erik, though the name of the character, Ericsson (son of Erik), may indicate the character represents Ingmar more than his father.) After The Best Intentions, Pernilla August played Ingmar's mother twice more, in the 1996 Private Confessions and 1997 In the Presence of a Clown.

Following Bergman's death in 2007, PostNord Sverige decided to honour the director with a postage stamp depicting him directing Fanny and Alexander. In the two decades following the release, "Fanny and Alexander" decorations were also common in Swedish businesses at Jul. In 2017, Hallwyl Museum also exhibited costumes from Fanny and Alexander and other Bergman films.

Stefan Larsson directed a stage adaptation of Fanny and Alexander for the Royal Dramatic Theatre, which traveled to Uppsala City Theater in 2012. It played at the John F. Kennedy Center for the Performing Arts in Washington, D.C., in 2013. In 2010, stage adaptations also played in Finland, directed by Maria Lundström and Tiina Puumalainen, and Norway, where it was the biggest box office success in the National Theatre's history. Later, Stephen Beresford wrote an adaptation for The Old Vic in London, directed by Max Webster and starring Penelope Wilton. It was scheduled to debut February 2018.

The film has exercised considerable influence on subsequent filmmaking, not only in Sweden. South Korean director Bong Joon-ho has listed it as one of his favourite films, and stated that it has "the most beautiful ending to a feature film career in the history of cinema". French director Arnaud Desplechin frequently cites Fanny and Alexander as a critical touchstone for his own career, and has labelled his own La Vie des Morts as "a complete rip-off of that film". He noted that "I saw Fanny and Alexander and then I became a director. Before, I was a technician, and after that film, I became a director." Fanny and Alexander is also listed as a favourite by filmmakers Barry Jenkins and Akira Kurosawa.

== See also ==
- List of longest films
- List of submissions to the 56th Academy Awards for Best Foreign Language Film
- List of Swedish submissions for the Academy Award for Best Foreign Language Film
