= Iwa Boman =

Swedish actress and playwright

Iwa Boman (born Rut Iva Elisabet Boman Söderberg on 23 November 1944) is a Swedish actress and playwright.

Boman was born in Sundsvall but grew up in Ånge.

She studied at the Swedish National Academy of Mime and Acting from 1969 to 1972 then after, she started working at Stockholm City Theatre.

== Selected filmography ==
- 1982 – Mamma (1982)
- 1986 – Morrhår och ärtor
- 1986 – The Brothers Mozart
- 1999–2000 – Nu är det nu (TV)
- 1995 – Älskar, älskar inte
- 1995 – Nattens barn (TV)
- 2002 – Skeppsholmen
- 2006 – Att göra en pudel
- 2009 – Superhjältejul (TV)
