= Simon Norrthon =

Swedish actor (born 1967)

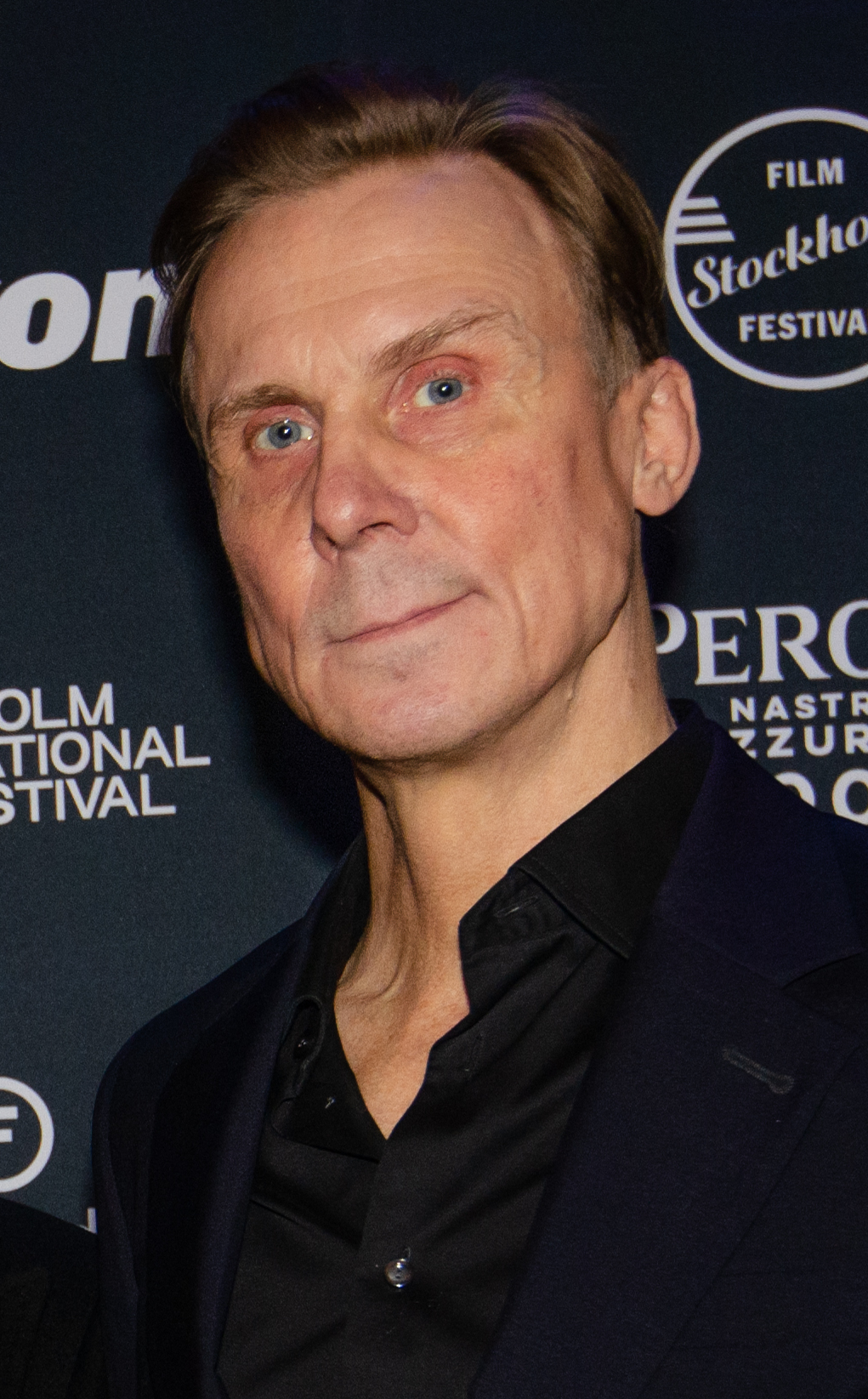
Image of Simon Norrthon

Erik Simon Norrthon (born 4 August 1967) is a Swedish actor born in Fosie, Malmö. He studied at the Swedish National Academy of Mime and Acting from 1989 to 1992. At the 29th Guldbagge Awards, he was nominated for the Best Actor award for his role in Speak Up! It's So Dark.

In 2018, he became the chairman of The Swedish Union for Performing Arts and Film.

== Selected filmography ==
- 1993 - Allis med is (TV)
- 1993 - Speak Up! It's So Dark
- 1994 - Rapport till himlen (TV)
- 2000 - The New Country (TV)
- 2003 - Kvarteret Skatan (TV)
- 2003 - Kommer du med mig då
- 2005 - Medicinmannen (TV)
- 2006 - Wallander – Blodsband
- 2006 - LasseMajas detektivbyrå (TV, Julkalendern)
- 2010 - Hotell Gyllene Knorren (TV, Julkalendern)
