= Suzanne Osten =

Swedish film director (1944–2024)

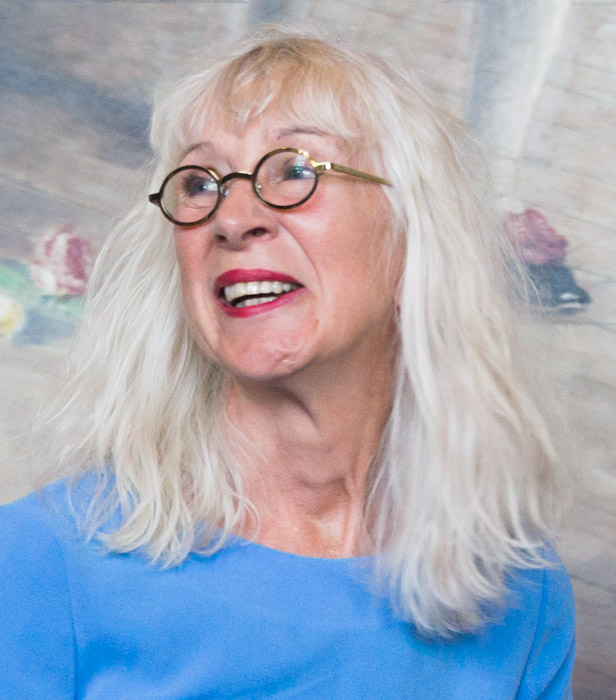
- Osten in 2015
- Born: Carlota Suzanne Osten; 20 June 1944; Stockholm, Sweden
- Died: 28 October 2024 (aged 80)
- Occupations: Playwright, director, writer, theater director, professor
- Years active: 1971–2024
- Children: 1

Carlota Suzanne Osten (20 June 1944 – 28 October 2024) was a Swedish film director, stage director, and screenwriter. She won the award for Best Director at the 22nd Guldbagge Awards for the film The Mozart Brothers.

== Biography ==
Suzanne Osten was born in Stockholm on 20 June 1944. She was the daughter of toolmaker Karl Otto Osten (1912–1970), a German social democrat and resistance fighter who fled to Sweden from the Nazi regime, and film critic Gerd Osten (born Ekbom), whose frustrating efforts to direct film in the male-dominated film industry are the subject matter of her daughter Suzanne's debut film Mamma (1982). Her parents were married in 1941 but divorced when Suzanne Osten was little. In 1963, Osten graduated from Viggbyholmsskolan, a high school with a curriculum focused on language and creative subjects. She then studied art, literature and history at Lund University, where she began directing at the university theater.

She had a daughter with documentary filmmaker Rainer Hartleb.

Osten died on 28 October 2024, at the age of 80. She had undergone heart surgery before her death.

== Theatre ==
Osten formed one of Sweden’s first fringe theatrical companies, Fickteatern, and began her career as a stage director there in the late 1960s. In 1971, she continued to Stockholm City Theatre, which would be her fixed point for many decades. At that venue, she became a leader in developing the political theater of that time. Together with Margareta Garpe, she wrote the play Tjejsnack ("Girl Talk", 1971), intended for teenaged girls. Some of the songs from that play, such as the feminist anthem Vi måste höja våra röster ("We have to raise our voices") are featured on the album Sånger för kvinnor och män ("Songs for women and men") from 1972. After this, Osten and Garpe wrote the plays Kärleksföreställningen ("The love notion", 1973), Jösses flickor! Befrielsen är nära ("Gee girls! Liberation is close", 1974) and Fabriksflickorna, makten och härligheten ("The factory girls, the power and the glory", 1980). All of these plays have a distinct connection to the Swedish feminist organization Grupp 8.

Suzanne Osten was a pioneer in developing theater for children. Throughout her career, she has advocated for art and culture for children and youth. She asserted that the child perspective is a question of power, about describing power relationships, and about seeing power from the perspective of the powerless, i.e., from an underdog perspective. A child is always more dependent on the adult since children are powerless in relation to adults. Osten remained true to this standpoint in her writing, directing, and even casting of plays and films. In 1975, she formed Unga Klara, a branch of Stockholm City Theater for the purpose of producing theatrical performances for children and youth. Osten worked there as both stage director and artistic director until the summer of 2014 and developed a process for creating a performance.

The playscript Babydrama (2006) was written by psychoanalyst and dramatist Ann-Sofie Bárány following a period of improvisation and research. This production was controversial because the intended audience was infants aged from six months. Osten had been cautioned that children this young could not comprehend a drama, but she defied critics, and, during this performance, infants, without previous theater-going knowledge, sat as a theatre audience collectively watching the play for one hour. Baby Drama is a cabaret with six actors. The narrative suggests the lived experience of the audience from conception, the time in the womb, birth, meeting with its family, and then on to a life of its own. Osten documented the reaction of the young audience in Baby Drama: A documentary film with the baby as the lens where the viewer sees infants' faces watching the performance. Osten found this to be proof of adult significance as performers, as art distributors, and of human love for communication. She interpreted the reaction of the audience as an innate need in a child for gestures, facial expressions, emotions, language, and bodies from which to learn communication.

Osten’s process involved the entire theatrical company; writers, actors, technicians, mask makers, based on research and extended collaboration with audience groups. This process is influenced by Keith Johnstone’s improvisational theater. Experts outside the theater world, artists, and academic researchers were invited by Osten to contribute with their expertise to the evolutionary and improvisational process of a stage production. Osten put this method of working to the test in Baby Drama when she wanted to investigate how early an audience can be receptive to theatrical performance.

=== Guest stage director ===
Osten was a guest director at theaters other than Unga Klara and in genres other than children's theater. These productions included the operetta Glada Änkan (The Merry Widow) at Folkoperan in 2008, and popular productions at Gothenburg City Theatre, such as Publiken [The Public] by Federico García Lorca and I Annas Garderob [In Anna’s closet] by Ann-Sofie Bárány, inspired by the life and work of Anna Freud. In 2014, Osten directed a major Nordic theatrical collaboration involving artists from Iceland, Finland, and Sweden. Magnus Maria: An opera about the right gender is about Maria Johansdotter/Magnus Johansson, whose destiny begins in the late 17th century in Föglö in Åland and ends a few decades later in Stockholm. The opera premiered in Mariestad, Åland, and toured the Nordic countries.

== Film ==
Osten went from the stage to film with two films made for television; Moa, Östen och Stella [Moa, Östen and Stella] (screenplay;1974) and Barn i Afrika [Children in Africa] (director; 1978), before she debuted with the full-length feature film Mamma (1982). Like her stage productions, her films also deal with political issues, for instance Skyddsängeln (The Guardian Angel) (1990) which focuses on political terrorism, although based on riots and demands for democracy in early 20th century Sweden. Tala! Det är så mörkt, (Speak up! It’s so dark) is about the wave of neo-Nazism that swept through Sweden in the 1980s and 90s and its link to unemployment among Swedish young people. For Bröderna Mozart (The Mozart brothers) (1986), Osten was awarded a Guldbagge in 1987 for Best Director. Outside of Sweden, The Guardian Angel, was selected for Un Certain Regard at the Cannes Film Festival in 1990.

=== Children's Film Ambassador ===
In November, 2014, Osten was appointed Sweden's first Children's Film Ambassador by the Swedish Film Institute. In this role, Osten worked for the development of film for children in the country. The position began in 2015.

== Controversy ==
The film The Girl, the Mother and the Demons (2016) was written and directed by Osten based on her fictionalized autobiography, Flickan, mamman och soporna [The Girl, the mother and the rubbish] (1998), which was revised for the stage by Erik Uddenberg with the same title. The film, with the release date April 2016, was shot for the age of 11 years and up. However, the Swedish censor rated it from 15 years and up in March 2016. The film had already been screened for selected families in Sweden and marketing was in progress when this decision was made. Osten's colleagues initiated a protest, and the rating decision was appealed successfully.

== Selected filmography ==
- Mamma (1982)
- The Mozart Brothers (1986)
- Lethal Film (1988)
- The Guardian Angel (1990)
- Speak Up! It's So Dark (1993)
- The Girl, the Mother and the Demons (2016)

== Selected bibliography ==
=== Fiction ===
- Papperspappan [The paper dad] 1994
- Flickan, mamman och soporna [The Girl, the mother and the rubbish] (1998)

=== Non-fiction ===
- Mina meningar [In my opinion] (2002)
- Babydrama – En konstnärlig forskningsrapport [Baby Drama: An artistic research report] (2009)
- Det allra viktigaste [What's most important] (2013)

== Selected awards ==
- 1985 – Prix d'Assitej
- 1987 – Guldbagge Award for Best Screenplay (The Mozart Brothers)
- 1990 – Tage Danielsson Prize
- 1991 – Film stipend for The Guardian Angel, Filmfestival Rouen
- 1992 – Alfons-bokalen
- 1995 – Henrik Steffens Prize, Kiel
- 2000 – Honorary doctorate from Lund University
- 2002 – Bernspriset, Svenska PEN-klubben
- 2002 – ASSITEJ's international honorary prize
- 2002 – Expressen's theater prize
- 2003 – Swedish Academy's theater prize
- 2003 – Natur & Kultur's cultural prize
- 2007 – Moa Prize
- 2008 – Swedish Confederation of Professional Employees cultural prize
- 2009 – Hope Prize, Institut for Folkeligt Teater i Danmark
- 2014 – Illis quorum (eighth size)
- 2014 – Per Gannevik stipend
- 2015 – Stig Dagerman Prize
- 2015 – Swedish Directors' Association Iris Prize for I Annas garderob at Gothenburg City Theatre
- 2015 – Swedish Union for Performing Arts and Film's gold medal for "outstanding artistic achievement"
- 2017 – City of Stockholm honor prize
- 2019 – H. M. The King's Medal in gold, in the 8th size, in the Order of the Seraphim (2019) for "outstanding achievements in theatre, film and opera".
- 2021 – Anders Carlberg Memorial Prize 2021 – for lifetime achievement in the service of culture and society
- 2022 – Guldbagge Honorary Award
- 2022 – Bonnier stipend
