= The Making of Fanny and Alexander =

- Poster of The Making of Fanny and Alexander
- Directed by: Ingmar Bergman
- Written by: Ingmar Bergman
- Starring: Ingmar Bergman; Daniel Bergman; Gunnar Björnstrand; Allan Edwall; Ewa Fröling; Lars Karlsson; Erland Josephson; Sven Nykvist; Peter Schildt
- Cinematography: Arne Carlsson
- Edited by: Sylvia Ingemarsson
- Release date: 16 September 1984
- Running time: 110 minutes
- Country: Sweden
- Language: Swedish

The Making of Fanny and Alexander (Swedish: Dokument Fanny och Alexander) is a 1984 Swedish documentary film directed by Ingmar Bergman which traces the making of his film Fanny and Alexander. Its running length is 110 minutes and it is photographed by Arne Carlsson. It debuted at the Swedish Film Institute on 16 September 1984, with Bergman in attendance to give a speech. It then aired with a television repeat of Fanny and Alexander in Sweden on 18 August 1986. In 2011 in Region A, The Criterion Collection released The Making of Fanny and Alexander on Blu-ray as part of their release of Fanny and Alexander.

The film was awarded as "Best documentary" at Chicago International Film Festival 1986 and the Golden Gate Award as "Best film about film" at San Francisco International Film Festival 1987.

== Storyline ==
It is a documentary chronicle of how Ingmar Bergman made an Oscar winning film.

== Cast ==
Source:
