= 22nd Guldbagge Awards =

Annual Swedish film awards ceremony

- Date: 2 February 1987
- Site: Sergelteatern, Stockholm, Sweden

Highlights
- Best Picture: The Sacrifice

The 22nd Guldbagge Awards ceremony, presented by the Swedish Film Institute, honored the best Swedish films of 1986, and took place on 2 February 1987. The Sacrifice directed by Andrei Tarkovsky was presented with the award for Best Film.

== Awards ==
- Best Film: The Sacrifice by Andrei Tarkovsky
- Best Director: Suzanne Osten for The Mozart Brothers
- Best Actor: Erland Josephson for Amorosa and The Sacrifice
- Best Actress: Stina Ekblad for Amorosa and The Serpent's Way
- Special Achievement: Jörgen Persson
- The Ingmar Bergman Award: Henry 'Nypan' Nyberg
