= Medan tiden tänker på annat =

1992 novel by Niklas Rådström

- First edition
- Author: Niklas Rådström
- Language: Swedish
- Published: 1992
- Publisher: Gedins Förlag
- Publication place: Sweden
- Awards: August Prize of 1992

Medan tiden tänker på annat (lit. When the Time Is Thinking About Other Things) is a 1992 novel by Swedish author Niklas Rådström. It won the August Prize in 1992.
