= Anna Asp =

Swedish production designer and art director

- Born: 16 May 1946 (age 80); Söderhamn, Sweden
- Occupations: Production designer Art director
- Years active: 1971-present

Anna Asp (born 16 May 1946) is a Swedish production designer and art director. She studied at Christer Strömholms School of Photography and then at Dramatiska Institutet in Stockholm in the late 1960s and early 1970s.

Over the course of her career Asp has collaborated on films with directors Ingmar Bergman, Andrei Tarkovsky, Bille August and Woody Allen, among others. She won the Academy Award for Best Art Direction in 1983 for her work in Fanny and Alexander. At the 28th Guldbagge Awards she won the Creative Achievement award. In addition, Asp has worked in theater and television production, including the Swedish TV series Wallander. Asp won the Swedish Union for Performing Arts and Film gold medal in 2008 for her "outstanding artistic work."
