= Hans Klinga =

Swedish actor and director (1949–2025)

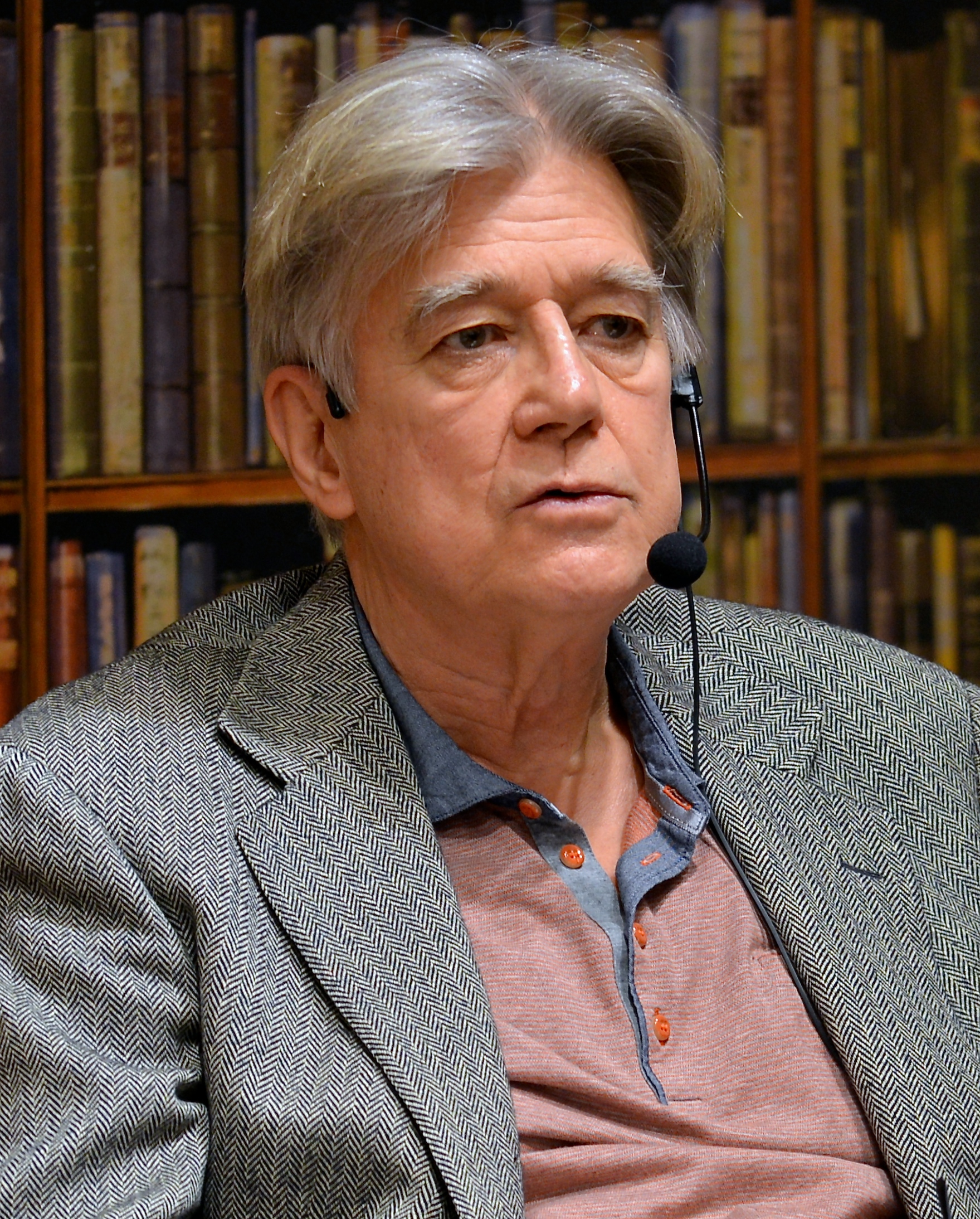
- Klinga in 2014
- Born: Hans Gösta Klinga; 17 April 1949; Västerås, Sweden
- Died: 26 January 2025 (aged 75)
- Occupations: Actor, film director
- Years active: 1970–2011
- Spouse: Lil Terselius (m. 1982–1990)
- Partner: Malin Ek
- Children: Elin Klinga

Hans Gösta Klinga (17 April 1949 – 26 January 2025) was a Swedish stage and film actor and film director. He won the Eugene O'Neill Award in 2009. Klinga died on 26 January 2025, at the age of 75. He was the father of Elin Klinga.
