= Niklas Rådström =

Swedish writer

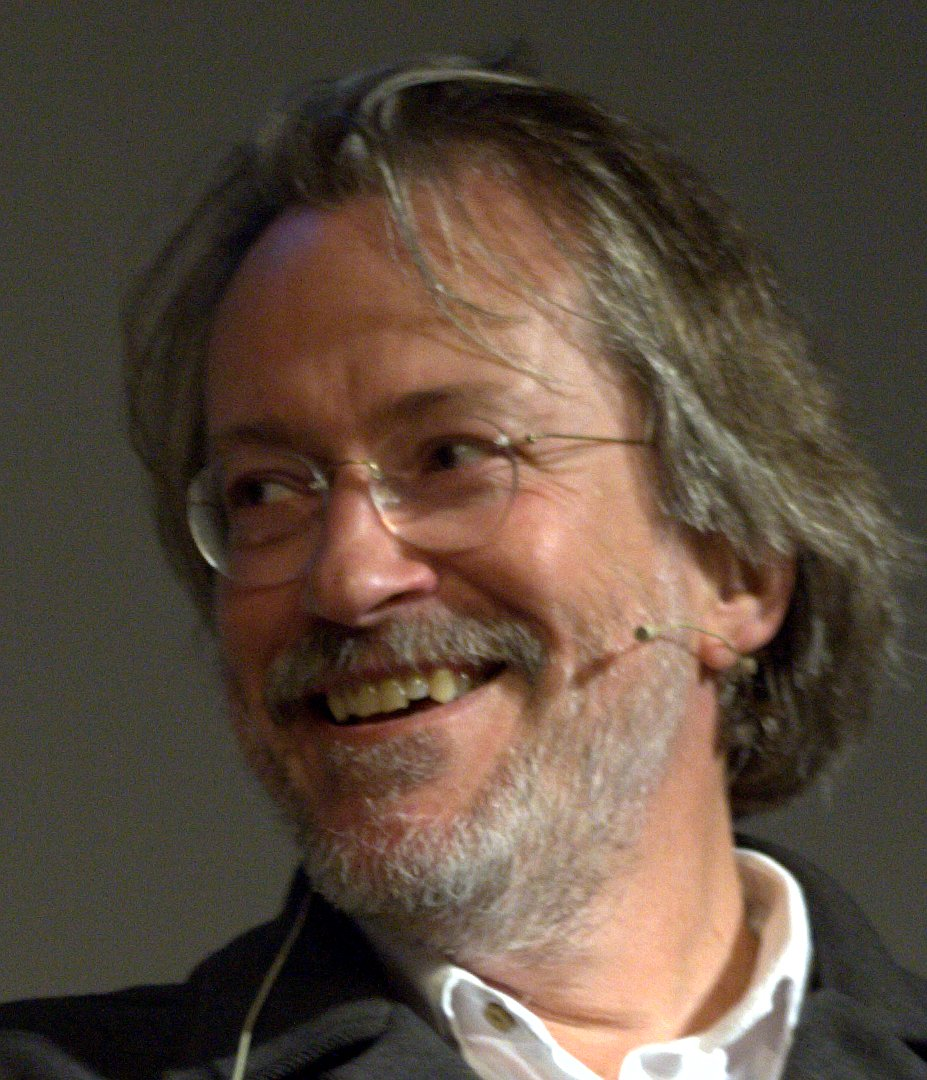
- Born: 12 April 1953 (age 73)
- Occupations: Poet, novelist and playwright
- Notable work: Medan tiden tänker på annat (1992)
- Father: Pär Rådström
- Awards: August Prize (1992); Dobloug Prize (2008)

Niklas Rådström (born 12 April 1953) is one of Sweden's most noted and prolific contemporary poets, novelists and playwrights. He is the son of the author Pär Rådström and theater director Anne Marie Rådström.

== Poetry ==
Rådström made his debut as a poet in 1975 and made a major breakthrough in 1979 with the poetry collection Poems about the life of Sandro della Quercia, a lyrical biography of a fictional Renaissance artist. During the following decade, he consolidated his position as one of the leading poets of his generation with collections such as The Shadow, The Temptations of Saint Anthony, The Living and Blockhead. He also wrote a travel book, In Egypt, on the other hand, illustrated by Stig Claesson. As librettist he has worked with Thomas Jennefelt, Sport & Leisure, and the four-hour opera Book of Life, based on the Bible, with music by Sven-David Sandström, who managed to finished the composing just weeks before he died in the summer of 2019. He has also worked with the prominent Swedish jazz musicians Bobo Stensson and Bengt Berger/Jonas Knutsson/Christian Spering.

== Screenwriting ==
As a screenwriter, he has collaborated with Suzanne Osten in the feature films Bröderna Mozart, and Talk! It's So Dark. In addition to working with Osten he has written the screenplay for Jan Troells Golden Globe-nominated film Everlasting Moments.

== As a playwright ==
In 1984 came his first full length play, Hitler's Childhood, which premiered on Young Klara directed by Suzanne Osten and played in a number of sets around the world. As a playwright, he has also done a number of major staging of literary works: Dante's Divine Comedy, 2004, the mastodont project The Bible, 2012, Don Quijote, 2013, and The Master and Margarita, 2014, after Mikhail Bulgakov's novel. His play for children The Earless Singer, 1997, based on a Japanese folk tale recorded by Lafcadio Hearn, has also become an opera with music by Gunnar Edander. With the full evening play On the way to the sea, 1998, Rådström returned to the theater and has since written a series of plays. Quartet, 1999, is a chamber play for four actors and a string quartet built around Dmitri Shostakovich's eighth string quartet and has been staged at, among others, Kungl. Dramatic Theater in Stockholm and De Konglige in Copenhagen. Rådström's play freely built on three censored chapters in Dostoevsky's novel The Evil Spirits, Long Silence. Suddenly Dark, 2002, won first prize in the Wilhelm Hansen Foundation's Nordic Drama Competition. Monsters, 2005, a play about the murder of two-year-old James Bulger by two 10-year-olds in Liverpool in 1993, has attracted international attention and has been played, among others venues, in the Netherlands and several times in England. In Walking Through a Mountain, 2007, Rådström describes in dramatic collage the mechanisms of depression and in the collaboration between four Danish theaters and the music group Middle East Peace Orchestra, "The Other Dreams", 2009, the Israel-Palestine conflict.

== Novels ==
In 1989 came his first novel The Moon Does Not Know, the first book in an autobiographical trilogy which also includes While Time Thinks of Other Things, 1992 (awarded the August Prize) and Streetcar on the Milky Way, 1996, is included. Among his other novels are the depiction of Stockholm in an 18th-century setting Turn your hourglass, 1991, the broad contemporary story inspired by ancient mythology, Angel among shadows, 1993, and the Shakespearean novel What You Want, 1995. With the novels Arcadian Driftwood, 1999, and The Planet of the Black Keys, 2001, Rådström began an as yet unfinished suite of Stockholm novels. Rådström returned to poetry in 2000 with the collection of poems On returning to poetry. In 2004, his remake of Dante's Divine Comedy was published, a poem in three acts. In 2003, together with the artist Catharina Günther Rådström, he published Absinthe about a blue tit that lived with the family for a summer. In The Guest, 2006, Rådström describes how H C Andersen visits Charles Dickens for five weeks in the summer of 1857. The autobiographical novel A Handful of Rain, 2007, tells of a close childhood friend's early death on his own and is also a meditation on the essence of suicide and depression. Mozart's librettist Lorenzo da Ponte's eventful life is the focus of the historical novel from 2010, The Moon's Relative. In 2012, Stig., a finely tuned memoir of the artist and author Stig Claesson, Slas, was published. In 2013, Rådström published the large novel The Book, a description that stretches over several thousand years and which reproduces the biblical books from the creation story to the Book of Revelation. In 2016, the novel A Marian Legend was published in which three stories from different continents and eras are woven together. In 2017, Niklas Rådström suffered from leukemia, something he wrote about in the collection of poems Then, when I was a poet, 2019, and in the novel As if nothing has already happened, 2020.

== Awards ==
At the 29th Guldbagge Awards Rådström was nominated for the award for Best Screenplay for the film Speak Up! It's So Dark.

He was awarded the Dobloug Prize in 2008.

== Other activities ==
Between 2012 and 2017, Rådström was a professor of narrative for stage, film and media at Stockholm Dramatic University. Since 2019 he has been professor of creative writing at Linnaeus University.

Since 1996 Rådström is a member of the prestigious Academy of The Nine.

In October 2018, Niklas Rådström abstained from membership of the Swedish Academy.
