= Upplandsmuseet =

Regional museum in Uppsala, Sweden

Coordinates: 59°51′32″N 17°38′05″E

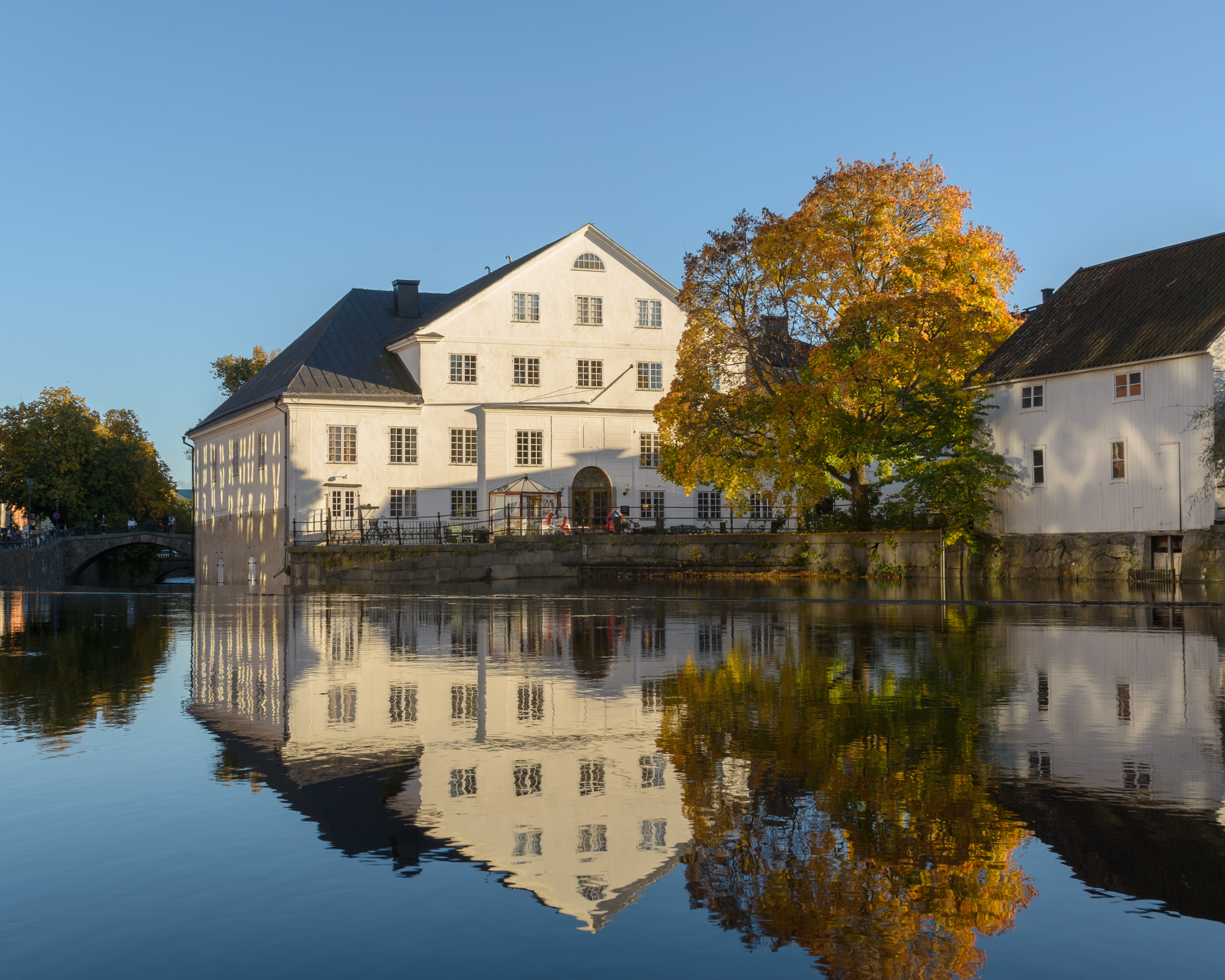
Akademikvarnen, site of the Upplandsmuseet

Upplandsmuseet is the county museum of Uppsala County, Sweden.

The institution is responsible for preservation and conducting research in the area of the cultural history and archaeology of the county, including the city of Uppsala (parts of the historical province of Uppland, from which the museum takes its name, belong to Stockholm County). The permanent exhibition covers subjects such as the history of the city, of Uppsala Cathedral, and of student life at Uppsala University. Public activities are conducted in the Akademikvarnen, the open air museum Disagården in Gamla Uppsala and at Walmstedtska gården in the Karin district of Uppsala.

The museum is headquartered in the Akademikvarnen, a former water mill belonging to the university, located on the Fyris River in central Uppsala. The former water mill was completed in 1768. It remained in operation until 1946. Between 1957 and 1959 the mill's premises were rebuilt to house the Uppland Museum. The exterior of the building was used by Ingmar Bergman for the bishop's house in the film Fanny and Alexander (1982).
