= The Crossroad =

1989 film by Ivars Seleckis

- Latvian: Šķērsiela
- Directed by: Ivars Seleckis
- Screenplay by: Tālivaldis Margēvičs
- Produced by: Leonids Berzins
- Cinematography: Ivars Seleckis
- Edited by: Maija Selecka
- Music by: Ivars Vigners
- Release date: 1988
- Running time: 89 minute
- Country: Latvian Soviet Socialist Republic
- Languages: Latvian, Russian

The Crossroad (Latvian: Šķērsiela) is a 1988 Soviet documentary film directed by Ivars Seleckis.

== Awards and accolades ==
- 3rd European Film Awards
  - Best Documentary - Won
