= Black Roses (1945 film) =

1945 film

- Directed by: Rune Carlsten
- Written by: Paul Baudisch; Gunnar Tannefors
- Starring: Viveca Lindfors; Anders Ek; Ulf Palme
- Cinematography: Karl-Erik Alberts
- Music by: Jules Sylvain; Gunnar Johansson
- Production company: Film AB Lux
- Distributed by: Film AB Lux
- Release date: 27 August 1945
- Running time: 102 minutes
- Country: Sweden
- Language: Swedish

Black Roses (Swedish: Svarta rosor) is a 1945 Swedish drama film directed by Rune Carlsten and starring Viveca Lindfors, Anders Ek and Ulf Palme.

== Cast ==
- Viveca Lindfors as Märta Lind
- Anders Ek as Bert Thorell
- Ulf Palme as Gunnar Bergström
- Erik Strandell as Per Bergstrm
- Gunnar Sjöberg as Harald Vestermark
- Karl-Magnus Thulstrup as Hilding
- Margareta Fahlén as Margit
- Tom Walter as Lars Persson
- Åke Claesson as Christian Lind, gardener
- John Ekman as Afzelius
- Eva Dahlbeck as Per Bergström's wife
- Harry Ahlin as Chief constable
- Axel Högel as Herman - gardener
- Kolbjörn Knudsen as Dr. Wingård
- Sven Lindberg as Swedish artist
- Signe Lundberg-Settergren as Signe
- Theodor Olsson as Klewens
- Erik Rosén as Chief physician
- Tekla Sjöblom as Miss Stendahl
- Georg Skarstedt as Swedish artist
- Albert Ståhl as Clerk
- Tord Stål as Dr. Granström
- Ruth Weijden as Miss Samuel

== Bibliography ==
- Alfred Krautz. International directory of cinematographers, set- and costume designers in film, Volume 5. Saur, 1986.
