= Speak Up! It's So Dark =

- Video tape cover
- Directed by: Suzanne Osten
- Written by: Niklas Rådström
- Produced by: Christer Nilson
- Starring: Etienne Glaser; Simon Norrthon
- Cinematography: Peter Mokrosinski
- Edited by: Michal Leszczylowski
- Distributed by: First Run Features (United States VHS)
- Release date: 19 February 1993
- Running time: 83 minutes
- Country: Sweden
- Language: Swedish

Speak Up! It's So Dark (Swedish: Tala! Det är så mörkt) is a 1993 Swedish drama film directed by Suzanne Osten. At the 29th Guldbagge Awards, Simon Norrthon was nominated for the Best Actor award and Niklas Rådström was nominated for Best Screenplay.

== Plot ==
An elderly Jewish man (Etienne Glaser) befriends a young neo-nazi (Simon Norrthon) on a train and invites him to his home. Through a series of discussions the two gradually come to understand each other better.

== Cast ==
- Etienne Glaser as Jacob
- Simon Norrthon as Sören the skinhead
- Anna-Yrsa Falenius as Raped Woman
- Anders Garpe as Sören's Father
- Gertrud Gidlund as Sören's Mother
- Pia Johansson as Nurse

== Distribution ==
Speak Up! It's So Dark was shown at the 1993 Toronto Festival of Festivals. It was distributed on video in the United States by First Run Features.

== Awards ==
- 1993: Créteil International Women's Film Festival - Grand Prix (Suzanne Osten)
