= 19th Guldbagge Awards =

Annual Swedish film awards ceremony

- Date: 31 October 1983
- Site: City Hall/Blue Hall, Stockholm, Sweden

Highlights
- Best Picture: Fanny and Alexander

The 19th Guldbagge Awards ceremony, presented by the Swedish Film Institute, honored the best Swedish films of 1982 and 1983, and took place on 31 October 1983. Fanny and Alexander directed by Ingmar Bergman was presented with the award for Best Film.

== Awards ==
- Best Film: Fanny and Alexander by Ingmar Bergman
- Best Director: Ingmar Bergman for Fanny and Alexander
- Best Actor: Jarl Kulle for Fanny and Alexander
- Best Actress:
  - Malin Ek for Mamma
  - Kim Anderzon for Second Dance
- The Ingmar Bergman Award: Gunnar Björnstrand
