= The Rite (1969 film) =

- Promotional poster
- Written by: Ingmar Bergman
- Directed by: Ingmar Bergman
- Starring: Ingmar Bergman; Gunnar Björnstrand; Anders Ek; Erik Hell; Ingrid Thulin
- Country of origin: Sweden
- Original language: Swedish

Production
- Producer: Lars-Owe Carlberg
- Cinematography: Sven Nykvist
- Running time: 72 minutes

Original release
- Release: 25 March 1969

The Rite (Swedish: Riten) is a 1969 Swedish drama film written and directed by Ingmar Bergman. It premiered on Swedish television on 25 March 1969. Actors Thea (Ingrid Thulin), Sebastian (Anders Ek) and Hans (Gunnar Björnstrand) are sequestered in the offices of Judge Abrahamson (Erik Hell), who questions them about the play they have been performing, which has been accused of being obscene. As the judge interviews them separately and together, the three performers work through their considerable psycho-sexual baggage with each other, while collectively laying siege to the sensibilities of their authoritarian interrogator.

The film had a joint Nordic premiere on television on 25 March 1969. It was rerun on SVT2 August 1, 1973. The premiere began with a short conversation between Ingmar Bergman and TV theatre director Lars Löfgren. Bergman urged the viewers to turn off the TV and go to the movies instead. Both Swedish and Norwegian critics were mostly positive, but somewhat confused.

== Plot ==
A judge in an unnamed country interviews three actors, together and separately, provoking them while investigating a pornographic performance for which they may face a fine. Their relationships are complicated. Sebastian, a volatile heavy drinker in debt, is guilty of killing his former partner and is having an affair with Thea, the dead man's widow. Thea, a high-strung woman who is prone to fits and seemingly fragile, is currently married to Sebastian's new partner, Hans. Hans is the troupe's leader. He is wealthy, self-contained, and growing weary of the troupe. The judge plays on the trio's insecurities, but they may have their revenge when they finally perform The Rite in a private session with him.

== Cast ==
- Ingmar Bergman – Priest
- Gunnar Björnstrand – Hans Winkelmann
- Anders Ek – Sebastian Fisher
- Erik Hell – Judge Abrahamson
- Ingrid Thulin – Thea Winkelmann / Claudia Monteverdi
