= Pär Rådström =

Swedish writer and journalist (1925–1963)

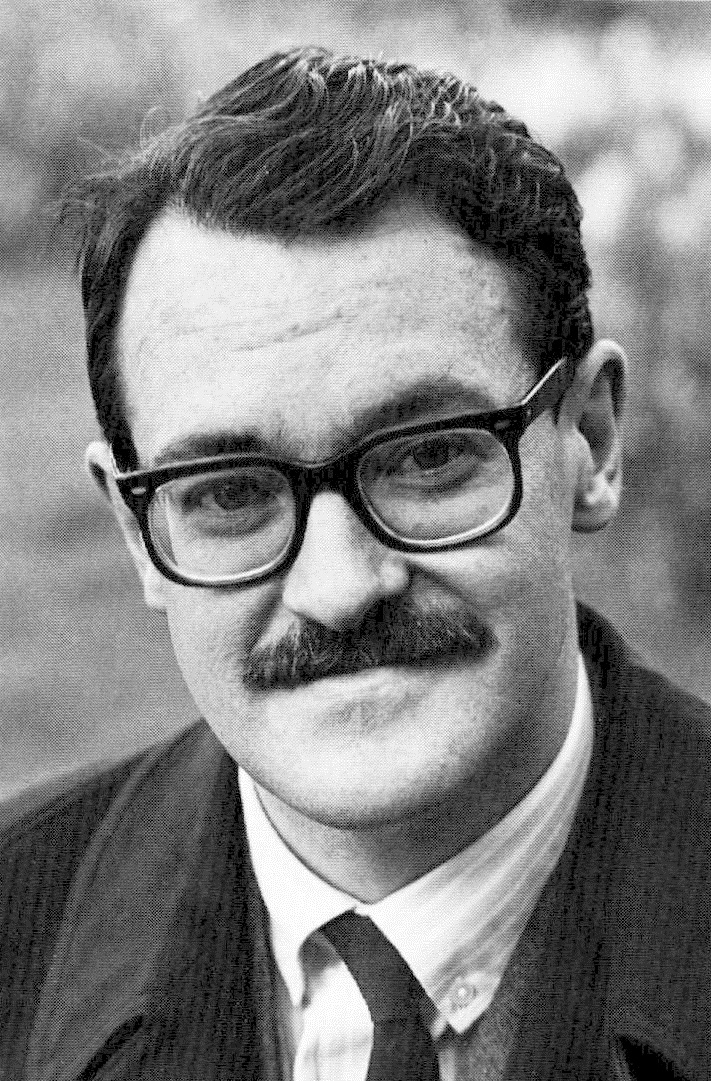
- Pär Rådström; Photo: Tore Johnson
- Born: 29 August 1925; Stockholm, Sweden
- Died: 29 August 1963 (aged 38); Stockholm, Sweden
- Spouse: Annemarie Rådström
- Children: Niklas Rådström
- Writing career
- Notable work: Ärans portar

Pär Kristian Rådström (29 August 1925 – 29 August 1963) was a Swedish writer and journalist. He also wrote popular songs and was a radio personality. His novel, Ärans portar (The Gates of Glory), published in 1954, was his first major success.

== Biography ==
Rådström was the son of the writer Karl Johan Rådström and the younger brother of the mathematician Hans Rådström (1919–1970). He was friends with authors Lars Forssell and Stig Claesson, and the subject of Claesson's book, Om vänskap funnes.

Rådström was married to Annemarie Rådström, a journalist and theater director, and their son is the poet and playwright, Niklas Rådström.

== Bibliography ==
- Men inga blommor vissnade (1946)
- Stjärnan under kavajslaget (1949)
- Tiden väntar inte (1952)
- Greg Bengtsson & kärleken (1953)
- Ärans portar (1954)
- Paris – en kärleksroman (1955)
- Ballong till månen (1958)
- Sommargästerna (1960)
- Översten (1961)
- Mordet. En sörmländsk herrgårdsroman (1962)
- Den korta resan (1963)

== Screenplay ==
- Kvinnan som försvann (1949)
