= Swedish Union for Performing Arts and Film =

Trade union in Sweden

- Teaterförbundet för scen och film
- Abbreviation: Scen & Film
- Founded: 1894
- Type: Trade union
- Headquarters: Stockholm
- Location: Sweden
- Fields: Theatre, cinema
- Members: 8,700
- Key people: Simon Norrthon, chairman
- Publication: Scen & Film
- Affiliations: TCO
- Website: scenochfilm.se
- Formerly called: Swedish Theatre Union

The Swedish Union for Performing Arts and Film, (Swedish: Teaterförbundet or Teaterförbundet för scen och film) is a Swedish trade union and professional association for professional practitioners of authors, artists, technicians, administrators and students in theater and film. The union was formed in 1894 and was originally called the Swedish Theatre Union. Since 2018, the chairman is Simon Norrthon.

The union has 8,700 members and is affiliated with the Swedish Confederation of Professional Employees (TCO), the Council for Negotiation and Cooperation (PTK), OFR, KLYS, and Kulturskaparna.
