= Madeleine Gustafsson (writer) =

Swedish writer, translator and literary critic

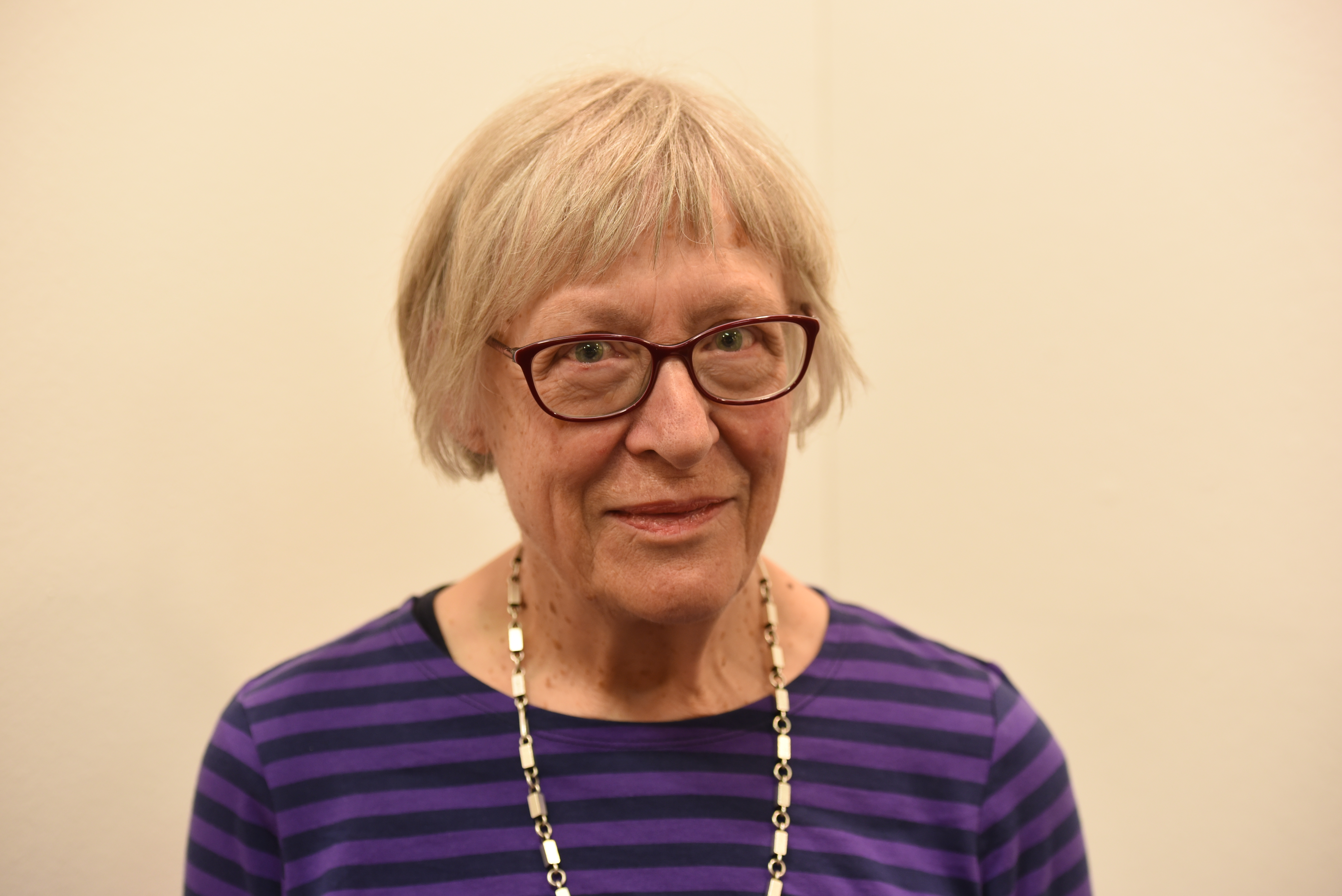
Madeleine Gustafsson in 2017

Dagmar Helena Madeleine Gustafsson (born 2 July 1937) is a Swedish writer, translator and literary critic.

Born in Gothenburg, Gustafsson graduated in philosophy from Uppsala University in 1961. She also has an honorary doctorate from University of Gothenburg. Gustafsson has worked as a literary critic for various newspapers including Dagens Nyheter. Her translations have included works by Marguerite Duras and Marcel Proust. In addition to essay collections, she has also published poetry. In 2013, she was awarded the Swedish Academy's Translation Prize.

Gustafsson was also one of the three screenwriters behind the film Skyddsängeln (1990) which appeared in English as The Guardian Angel. As a result, she received a European Film Academy award for European Screenwriter of the Year 1990.

== Works ==
- Utopien och dess skugga: studier i samtida fransk idédebatt (Norstedt, 1978)
- Med andras ögon: om böcker mest (LiberFörlag, 1978)
- Solida byggen: poetry (Norstedt, 1979)
- Vattenväxter: poetry (Norstedt, 1983)
- Berättelsens röst: från Bernhard till Yourcenar (Norstedt, 1991)
- Att skriva om böcker (Tegnérsamfundet, 1993)
- Fång-lada (poesi) (Norstedt, 1993)
