= The Guardian Angel (1990 film) =

1990 film

- Directed by: Suzanne Osten
- Written by: Ricarda Huch (novella); Etienne Glaser; Suzanne Osten; Madeleine Gustafsson
- Produced by: Anders Birkeland
- Starring: Philip Zandén
- Cinematography: Göran Nilsson
- Release date: 23 February 1990
- Running time: 108 minutes
- Country: Sweden
- Language: Swedish

The Guardian Angel (Swedish: Skyddsängeln) is a 1990 Swedish drama film directed by Suzanne Osten. Malin Ek won the award for Best Actress at the 26th Guldbagge Awards.

== Cast ==
- Pia Bäckström as Maria Demodov
- Malin Ek as Livia Birkman
- Etienne Glaser as Joel Birkman
- Hanna Hartleb as Hanna
- Björn Kjellman as Welja
- Tuncel Kurtiz as Ivar
- Sven Lindqvist as Polisministern
- Lena Nylén as Jessica
- Gunilla Röör as Katja
- Reuben Sallmander as Konstantin
- Lars Wiik as Secretary
- Philip Zandén as Jacob
