= The Mozart Brothers =

1986 Swedish film comedy

- Directed by: Suzanne Osten
- Written by: Etienne Glaser; Niklas Rådström; Suzanne Osten
- Produced by: Göran Lindström
- Starring: Etienne Glaser
- Cinematography: Hans Welin
- Music by: Björn J:son Lindh
- Release date: 21 February 1986
- Running time: 109 minutes
- Country: Sweden
- Language: Swedish

The Mozart Brothers (Swedish: Bröderna Mozart) is a 1986 Swedish comedy film directed by Suzanne Osten. Osten won the award for Best Director at the 22nd Guldbagge Awards.

== Plot ==
The film depicts an unconventional opera director, Walter (Etienne Glaser), who is directing a production of Mozart's Don Giovanni at the Royal Swedish Opera. He attempts to overthrow many of the conventions of opera; he gives certain solo numbers to the opera chorus, he involves the orchestra in the acting, and he wants to fill the stage with damp earth to simulate a graveyard. The singers, the members of the orchestra, and the staff at the opera house are initially very antagonistic to his plans, especially his appeal to their eroticism as individuals. However, they reluctantly agree to do things Walter's way, and gradually come over to his point of view. Throughout the film, Mozart's ghost is glimpsed more and more frequently, at one point seen weeping with joy at the effect his work has had. The film ends with the premiere of the production being a resounding success, and the performers taking the credit for this, with the director largely forgotten.

== Cast ==
- Etienne Glaser as Walter
- Philip Zandén as Flemming
- Henry Bronett as Fritz
- Loa Falkman as Eskil / Don Juan
- Agneta Ekmanner as Marian / Donna Elvira
- Lena T. Hansson as Ia / Donna Anna
- Helge Skoog as Olof / Don Ottavio
- Grith Fjeldmose as Therés / Zerlina
- Rune Zetterström as Lennart / Leporello
- Niklas Ek as Georg / Donna Anna's Father
- Krister St. Hill as Ulf / Mazzetto

== Trivia ==
Although it has become an obscure film, some remember it in association with the murder of Swedish Prime Minister Olof Palme, who was returning home from the cinema after a screening on 28 February 1986.

== See also ==
- Our American Cousin — the play Abraham Lincoln was watching when he was assassinated
