= Malin Ek =

Swedish stage and film actress

- Born: 18 April 1945 (age 80); Malmö, Sweden
- Occupation: Actress
- Partner: Hans Klinga
- Children: Elin Klinga
- Parent(s): Anders Ek; Birgit Cullberg
- Relatives: Niklas Ek (brother); Mats Ek (brother)

Malin Ek (born 18 April 1945) is a Swedish stage and film actress. She won the Eugene O'Neill Award in 2010. She is the daughter of actor Anders Ek (the 1971 O'Neill Award laureate) and choreographer Birgit Cullberg.

She won the award for Best Actress at the 19th Guldbagge Awards for her role in Mamma. She won again in 1985 for her role in False as Water. She won it for a third time at the 26th Guldbagge Awards for her role in The Guardian Angel.

== Selected filmography ==
- Mamma (1982)
- False as Water (1985)
- The Guardian Angel (1990)
