= Arnold Weinstein (scholar) =

American literary scholar (born 1940)

- Born: Arnold Weinstein; July 8, 1940 (age 86); Memphis, Tennessee
- Education: Princeton University; Harvard University
- Scientific career
- Fields: Literary modernism, American literature, French literature, Scandinavian literature
- Workplaces: Brown University

Arnold Louis Weinstein (born July 8, 1940) is an American literary scholar best known for his writing that makes the case for modernist literature's enduring value for understanding the human experience. He taught at Brown University for 54 years and is now the university's Edna and Richard Salomon Distinguished Professor Emeritus of Comparative Literature.

Weinstein's numerous articles and eight books have been recognized with various honors. In 2009, for instance, The Atlantic's literary editor Benjamin Schwarz named Weinstein's study of Scandinavian modernism, Northern Arts: The Breakthrough of Scandinavian Literature and Art, from Ibsen to Bergman, one of the 25 best books of the year. In 2023, he was awarded an honorary degree by Union College.

== Early life and education ==
Weinstein was born in Memphis, Tennessee. After earning a B.A. in Romance Languages at Princeton University in 1962, he enrolled at Harvard University, where he received both an M.A. (1964) and a Ph.D. in Comparative Literature (1968). He studied in Europe during his undergraduate and graduate years, spending time at Universite de Paris, Freie Universitat Berlin, and Universite de Lyon.

== Career ==
Weinstein joined the faculty at Brown University in 1968, shortly before the adoption of the New Curriculum. He worked to bring students to the Department of Comparative Literature through promoting interdisciplinary collaboration and the study of non-Western literature. He was promoted to Associate Professor in 1973 and Full Professor in 1978. In 2007, he delivered the keynote address, titled "Reading Proust, Tracking Bears, at Brown," at the Opening Convocation of the university's 244th year.

After 54 years on the faculty, Weinstein retired in 2023.

== Personal life ==
Weinstein is married to Ann Cathrine Weinstein (née Berntson), former coordinator of Brown University's Swedish program. He has twin brother, Philip Weinstein, a former professor of English at Swarthmore College.

== Books ==
- Vision and Response in Modern Fiction. Ithaca, NY: Cornell University Press, 1974.
- Fictions of the Self: 1550-1800. Princeton, NJ: Princeton University Press, 1981.
- The Fiction of Relationship. Princeton, NJ: Princeton University Press, 1988.
- Nobody's Home: Speech, Self and Place in American Fiction from Hawthorne to DeLillo. 1993.
- A Scream Goes Through the House: What Literature Teaches Us About Life. New York, Random House, 2003.
- Recovering Your Story: Proust, Joyce, Woolf, Faulkner, Morrison. New York: Random House, 2006.
- Northern Arts: The Breakthrough of Scandinavian Literature and Art, from Ibsen to Bergman. Princeton, NJ: Princeton University Press, 2008.
- Morning, Noon, and Night: Finding the Meaning of Life's Stages Through Books. New York: Random House, 2011.
- The Lives of Literature: Reading, Teaching, Knowing. Princeton: Princeton University Press, 2021.
