= Anders Ek =

Swedish actor (1916–1979)

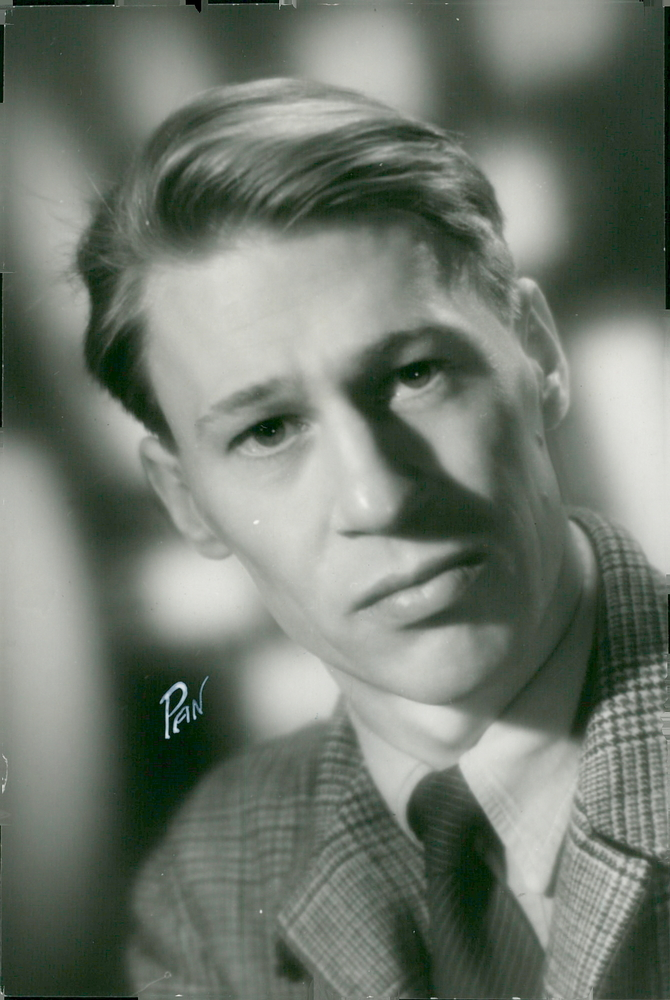
- Ek in 1950
- Born: 7 April 1916; Gothenburg, Sweden
- Died: 17 November 1979 (aged 63); Stockholm, Sweden
- Years active: 1942–1976

Anders Ek (7 April 1916 – 17 November 1979) was a Swedish film actor. He was born in Gothenburg, Sweden and died in Stockholm. He was married to Birgit Cullberg and is the father of dancer Niklas Ek (born 1943), dancer Mats Ek and actress Malin Ek (twins born 1945).

== Filmography ==
Year	Title	Role	Notes
1942	Rid i natt!	Peasant	Uncredited
1943	När ungdomen vaknar	Kåre	
1944	We Need Each Other	Kooperatör hos Phoebus	
1944	Vår herre luggar Johansson	Olle	
1944	Stopp! Tänk på något annat	Mårten Bergfelt	
1944	The Girl and the Devil	Olof	
1945	Black Roses	Bert Thorell	
1950	Girl with Hyacinths	Elias Körner - Artist	
1953	The Road to Klockrike	Bolle	
1953	Sawdust and Tinsel	Frost	
1957	The Seventh Seal	The Monk	
1967	I Am Curious (Yellow)	Exercise Leader	Uncredited
1969	The Rite	Sebastian Fisher	TV film
1972	Cries and Whispers	Isak	
1976	Hello Baby	Himself	
