= Birgit Cullberg =

Swedish ballet choreographer (1908–1999)

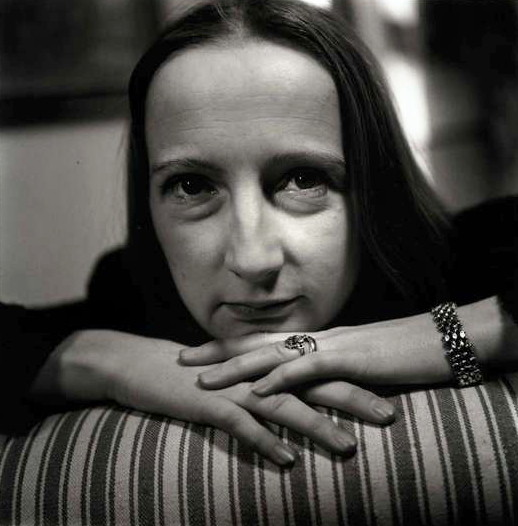
Cullberg in 1943

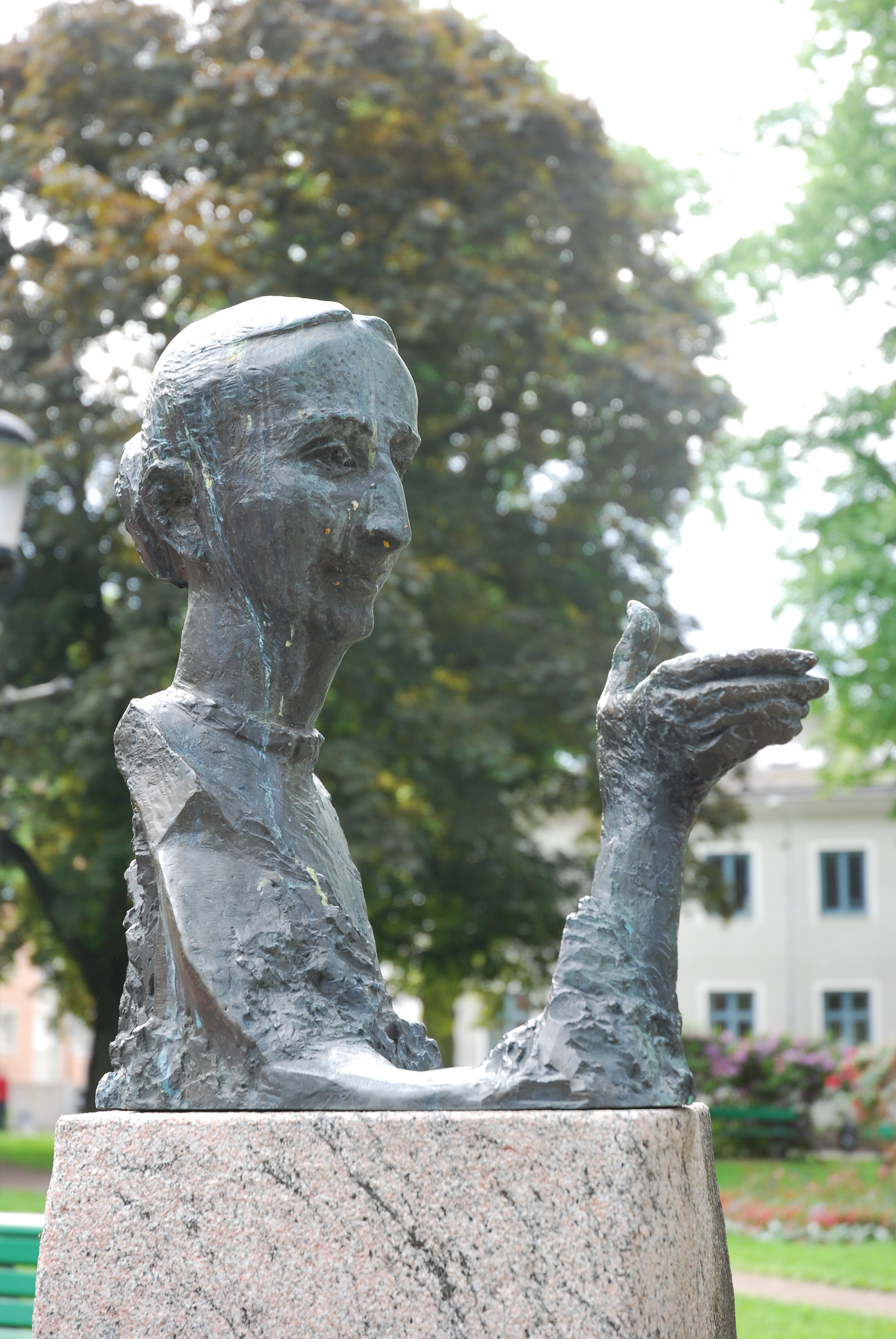
Portrait of Birgit Cullberg by Willy Gordon, outside the Theatre in Nyköping, Sweden

Birgit Ragnhild Cullberg (3 August 1908 – 8 September 1999) was a Swedish choreographer. Her father Carl Cullberg was a bank director and her mother was Elna Westerström. Cullberg was born in Nyköping and was married from 1942 to 1949 to actor Anders Ek. She was the mother of Niklas Ek in 1943, and twins Mats Ek, and Malin Ek in 1945.

Cullberg studied ballet under Kurt Jooss-Leeder and Lilian Karina and at The Royal Ballet, London (1952–1957). In 1960, Cullberg was appointed director and choreographer at the Stockholm City Theatre. Some of her choreographies were premiered at the Royal Opera in Stockholm.

Cullberg gained international recognition by founding the Cullberg Ballet in the 1960s. On her retirement in 1985, her son Mats Ek took over the ballet company. The Swedish Arts Grants Committee instituted the Cullberg scholarship in her honour, and she was awarded an honorary professorship at Stockholm University, where she had studied when she was young. In 1977 she was awarded the Litteris et Artibus and in 1983 the Illis quorum. She also received the French honour Commandeur des Arts et Lettres and the Italian honour Cavaliere Ufficiale al Merito della Repubblica Italiana.

== Selected choreography ==
- 1950 Miss Julie
- 1957 The Moon Reindeer
- 1960 The Lady from the Sea
