= Gotska Sandön =

Swedish island

Gotska Sandön National Park
- Gotska Sandöns nationalpark
- IUCN category II (national park)
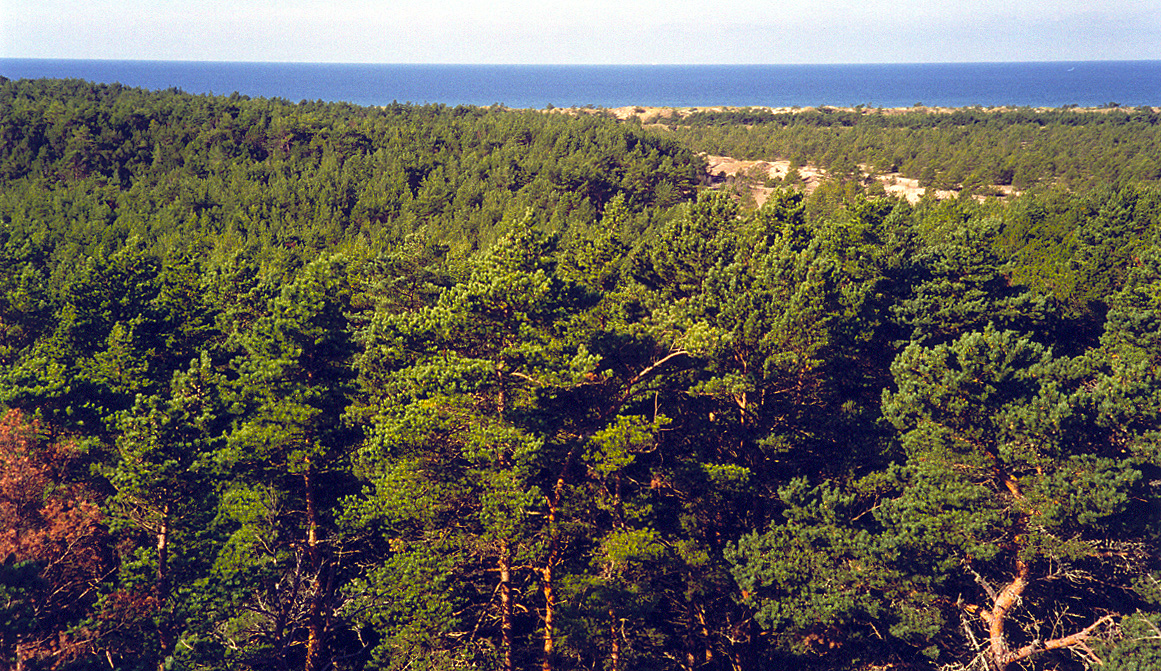
- The eastern coast, as seen from the lighthouse

- Location within Gotland Location within Sweden
- Location: Gotland County, Sweden
- Nearest city: Fårösund, Gotland Municipality
- Coordinates: 58°22′N 19°15′E
- Area: 44.9 km^{2} (17.3 sq mi)
- Established: 1909, extended in 1963 and 1988
- Governing body: Naturvårdsverket

Gotska Sandön (literally translated as "The Gotlandic Sand Island") is an uninhabited Swedish island north of Gotland in the Baltic Sea. It has been a national park since 1909.

== Geography ==
National parks of Sweden (clickable map)

Sandön is situated 38 km (24 mi) north of Fårö in the Baltic Sea. Legally a part of Gotland province, it is approximately 9 km (5.6 mi) long and 6 km (3.7 mi) wide, with a total area of approximately 36 km^{2} (14 sq mi). The island is part of Fårö socken (not to be confused with parish). It comprises the same area as the administrative Fårö District, established on 1 January 2016.

On the northwest tip of the island is a church, Gotska Sandön Chapel. As of 2019, Gotska Sandön Chapel along with Fårö Church belong to Fårö parish in Norra Gotlands pastorat.

During the summer, there are regular boat tours from Fårö Island and Nynäshamn on the mainland.

== Nature of Gotska Sandön ==
The island consists mostly of sand and is dominated by beaches, dunes and especially pine forests. Aside from a colony of grey seals on the north side of the island, the higher fauna is not very rich. Terrestrial or aerial mammals include mountain hares and bats. However, the island is home to many rare insects and plants, including the Kashubian vetch and several species of orchid.

== Climate ==
Despite its isolation from sizeable landmasses, Gotska Sandön's oceanic climate is warm for its latitude. The Scandinavian Peninsula to the west, Gotland to the south and the Baltic landmass to the east contribute to warmer summers and frequent winter frost, giving the island a far broader temperature range than, for example, the similarly isolated Fair Isle, which lies one degree further north some distance off the coast of Scotland. In spite of this range, summer highs are cool by the standards of southern Sweden, and winter nights are among the mildest in the country.

Gotska Sandön has significant seasonal lag: despite dwindling daylight hours, August is much warmer than June, while March days are both longer and colder than those in December.

Climate data for Gotska Sandön (2002–2018; extremes since 1901)
| Month | Jan | Feb | Mar | Apr | May | Jun | Jul | Aug | Sep | Oct | Nov | Dec | Year |
|---|---|---|---|---|---|---|---|---|---|---|---|---|---|
| Record high °C (°F) | 8.6 (47.5) | 9.6 (49.3) | 13.8 (56.8) | 21.8 (71.2) | 27.0 (80.6) | 29.0 (84.2) | 31.6 (88.9) | 31.1 (88.0) | 27.0 (80.6) | 18.6 (65.5) | 11.9 (53.4) | 9.8 (49.6) | 31.6 (88.9) |
| Mean maximum °C (°F) | 5.4 (41.7) | 5.0 (41.0) | 8.3 (46.9) | 14.3 (57.7) | 20.5 (68.9) | 23.3 (73.9) | 26.6 (79.9) | 26.1 (79.0) | 20.9 (69.6) | 15.3 (59.5) | 10.1 (50.2) | 7.0 (44.6) | 27.5 (81.5) |
| Mean daily maximum °C (°F) | 1.7 (35.1) | 1.4 (34.5) | 3.6 (38.5) | 8.1 (46.6) | 13.6 (56.5) | 18.1 (64.6) | 21.9 (71.4) | 21.4 (70.5) | 16.8 (62.2) | 10.6 (51.1) | 6.7 (44.1) | 3.8 (38.8) | 10.6 (51.2) |
| Daily mean °C (°F) | 0.3 (32.5) | −0.2 (31.6) | 1.3 (34.3) | 4.9 (40.8) | 10.0 (50.0) | 14.4 (57.9) | 18.4 (65.1) | 18.1 (64.6) | 14.2 (57.6) | 8.7 (47.7) | 5.1 (41.2) | 2.3 (36.1) | 8.1 (46.6) |
| Mean daily minimum °C (°F) | −1.2 (29.8) | −1.8 (28.8) | −1.1 (30.0) | 1.7 (35.1) | 6.3 (43.3) | 10.7 (51.3) | 14.8 (58.6) | 14.7 (58.5) | 11.5 (52.7) | 6.7 (44.1) | 3.5 (38.3) | 0.8 (33.4) | 5.6 (42.0) |
| Mean minimum °C (°F) | −7.7 (18.1) | −7.4 (18.7) | −6.7 (19.9) | −3.1 (26.4) | 0.4 (32.7) | 5.5 (41.9) | 9.7 (49.5) | 9.4 (48.9) | 5.7 (42.3) | 0.5 (32.9) | −1.9 (28.6) | −4.3 (24.3) | −9.9 (14.2) |
| Record low °C (°F) | −22.0 (−7.6) | −25.0 (−13.0) | −23.2 (−9.8) | −16.0 (3.2) | −6.0 (21.2) | −2.0 (28.4) | 3.1 (37.6) | 3.1 (37.6) | −1.5 (29.3) | −5.2 (22.6) | −9.2 (15.4) | −13.8 (7.2) | −25.0 (−13.0) |
| Average precipitation mm (inches) | 43.9 (1.73) | 35.4 (1.39) | 27.1 (1.07) | 24.0 (0.94) | 27.1 (1.07) | 43.0 (1.69) | 50.0 (1.97) | 62.5 (2.46) | 42.9 (1.69) | 51.6 (2.03) | 58.0 (2.28) | 50.9 (2.00) | 516.4 (20.32) |
Source 1: SMHI Open Data
Source 2: SMHI Monthly Data 2002–2018

== Gallery ==
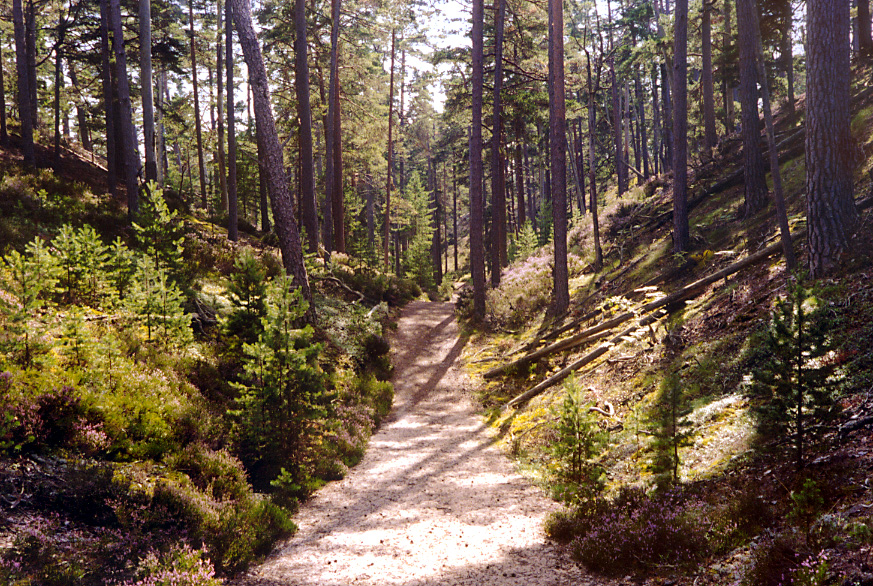
A track through the sand dunes, popularly called "Schipka Pass"

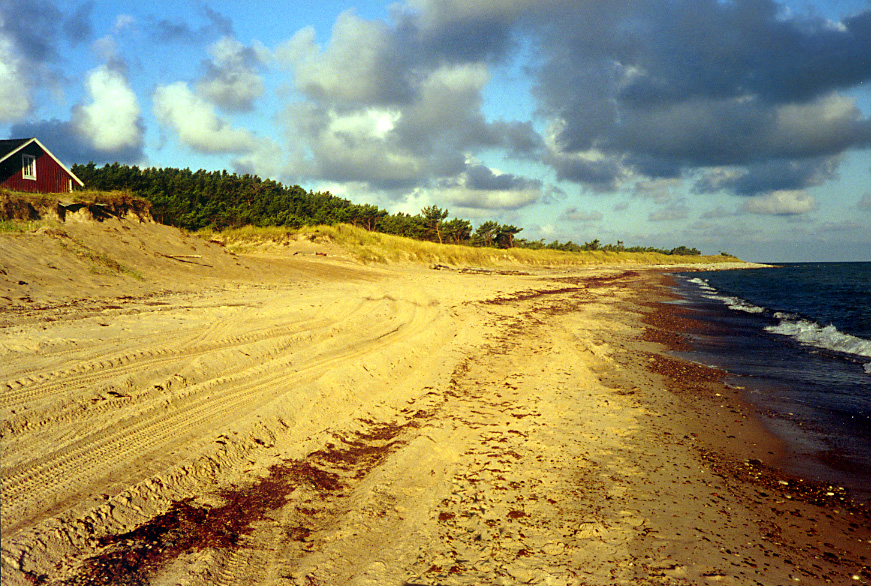
The north-eastern coast
