= 1967 National Society of Film Critics Awards =

Annual US film award ceremony

2nd NSFC Awards

January 1968

Best Picture:
Persona

The 2nd National Society of Film Critics Awards, given by the National Society of Film Critics in January 1968, honored the best in film for 1967.

The member critics voting for the awards were Hollis Alpert of the Saturday Review, Brendan Gill of The New Yorker, Philip T. Hartung of Commonweal, Pauline Kael of The New Yorker, Stanley Kauffmann of The New Republic, Arthur Knight of Saturday Review, Joseph Morgenstern of Newsweek, Andrew Sarris of The Village Voice, Richard Schickel of Life, Wilfrid Sheed of Esquire, and John Simon of The New Leader.

== Winners ==
=== Best Picture ===
- Persona (18 points)

2. Bonnie and Clyde (9 points)
3. Closely Watched Trains (8 points)

=== Best Director ===
- Ingmar Bergman – Persona (majority vote on the first ballot)

=== Best Actor ===
- Rod Steiger – In the Heat of the Night (10 points)

2. Marcello Mastroianni – The Stranger (8 points)
2. Yves Montand – The War Is Over (8 points)

=== Best Actress ===
- Bibi Andersson – Persona (23 points)

2. Annie Girardot – Live for Life (20 points)
3. Edith Evans – The Whisperers (17 points)

=== Best Supporting Actor ===
- Gene Hackman – Bonnie and Clyde (16 points)

2. Jean Martin – The Battle of Algiers (7 points)
3. Brian Keith – Reflections in a Golden Eye (6 points)

=== Best Supporting Actress ===
- Marjorie Rhodes – The Family Way (11 points)

2. Vivien Merchant – Accident (10 points)
3. Ellen O'Mara – Up the Down Staircase (8 points)

=== Best Screenplay ===
- David Newman and Robert Benton – Bonnie and Clyde (14 points)

2. Ingmar Bergman – Persona (13 points)
3. Jiří Menzel and Bohumil Hrabal – Closely Watched Trains (10 points)

=== Best Cinematography ===
- Haskell Wexler – In the Heat of the Night (16 points)

2. Conrad L. Hall – Cool Hand Luke and In Cold Blood (9 points)
3. Sven Nykvist – Persona (6 points)
3. Nicolas Roeg – Far from the Madding Crowd (6 points)
