= Bergman Week =

Bergman Week (Swedish: Bergmanveckan) is an annual event organized by the Bergmancenter on the Swedish island of Fårö in the Baltic Sea. Ingmar Bergman moved to the island in the 1960s and the Bergman Week is a celebration of his artistry, with films, lectures and conversations.

The first Bergman Week was organised in 2004. Guests in 2012 were among others Belgian directors Jean-Pierre and Luc Dardenne (Dardenne brothers), author Peter Birro, director Suzanne Osten and opera singer Håkan Hagegård. Guests at the Bergman Week 2011 were among others directors Andrey Zvyagintsev and István Szabó as well as Swedish authors Henning Mankell and Sara Stridsberg.

Several Swedish and international guests have visited the week through the years, among them Wim Wenders, Kenneth Branagh, Harriet Andersson, Bibi Andersson and Ang Lee. Guests of the Bergman Week 2010 were among others actress Liv Ullmann, playwright Jon Fosse and director Ariane Mnouchkine.
