= 4th Guldbagge Awards =

Annual Swedish film awards ceremony

- Date: 9 October 1967
- Site: Spegeln & Operaterrassen, Stockholm, Sweden

Highlights
- Best Picture: Persona

The 4th Guldbagge Awards ceremony, presented by the Swedish Film Institute, honored the best Swedish 1966 and 1967, and took place on 9 October 1967. Persona, directed by Ingmar Bergman, was presented with the award for Best Film.

== Awards ==
- Best Film: Persona by Ingmar Bergman
- Best Director: Jan Troell for Here's Your Life
- Best Actor: Per Oscarsson for Hunger
- Best Actress: Bibi Andersson for Persona
- Special Achievement: Krister Wickman
