= Fårö =

Island in the Baltic Sea

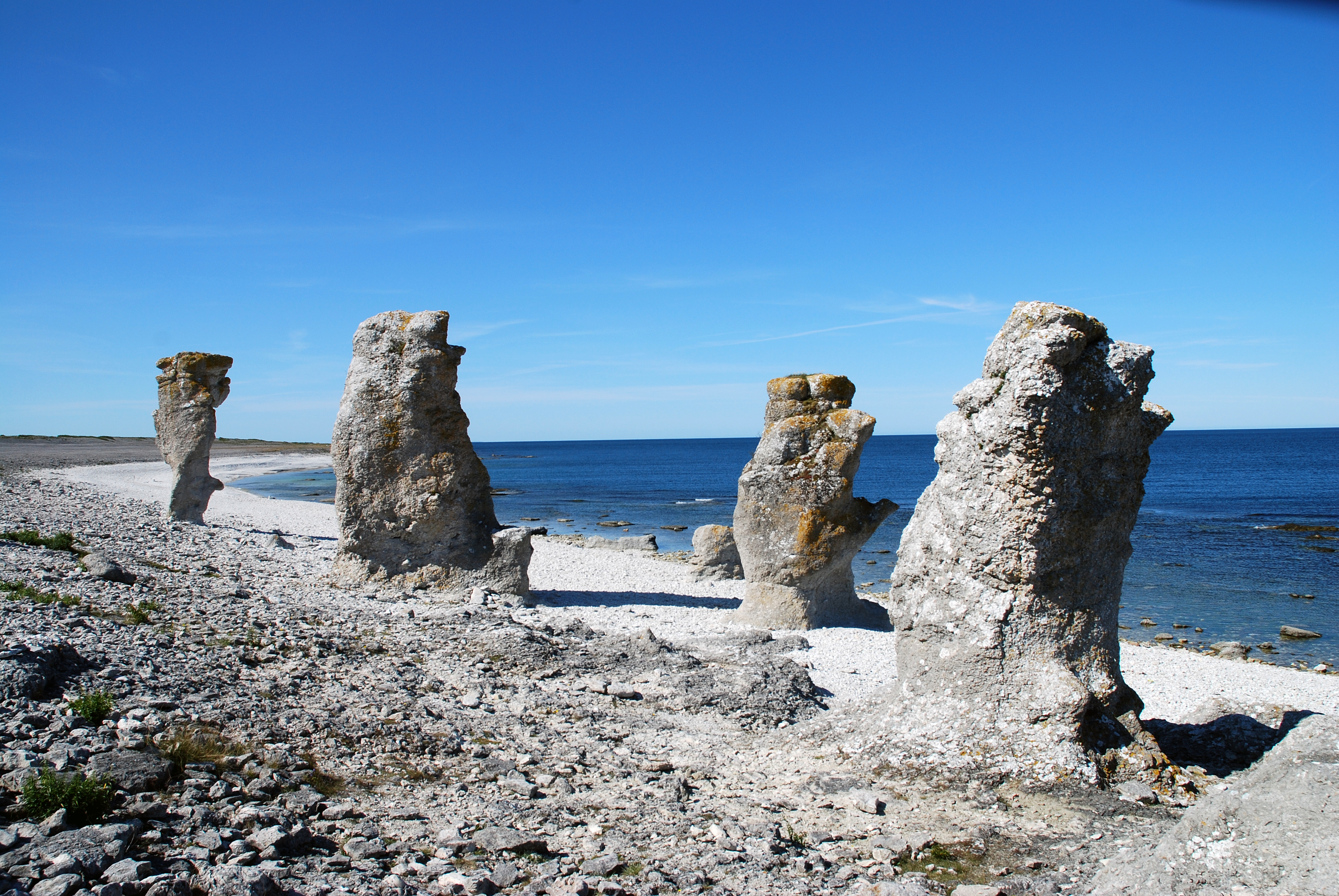
- Rauks at Langhammars, Fårö

- Location within Gotland

Geography
- Coordinates: 57°57′N 19°09′E
- Adjacent to: Baltic Sea
- Area: 113.30 km^{2} (43.75 sq mi)

Administration
- Sweden
- County: Gotland County
- Municipality: Gotland Municipality

Demographics
- Population: 505 (2021)

Fårö (Swedish pronunciation: [ˈfôːrøː]; Fåre in Gutnish) is a Baltic Sea island just north of the island of Gotland, itself off mainland Sweden's southeastern coast. It is the second-largest island in the county and a popular summer resort. It has its own language, Fårömål, a dialect of Gutnish.

Fårö is also the name of the populated area (socken) consisting of both Fårö and Gotska Sandön islands. It comprises the same area as the administrative Fårö District, established on 1 January 2016.

== Geography ==
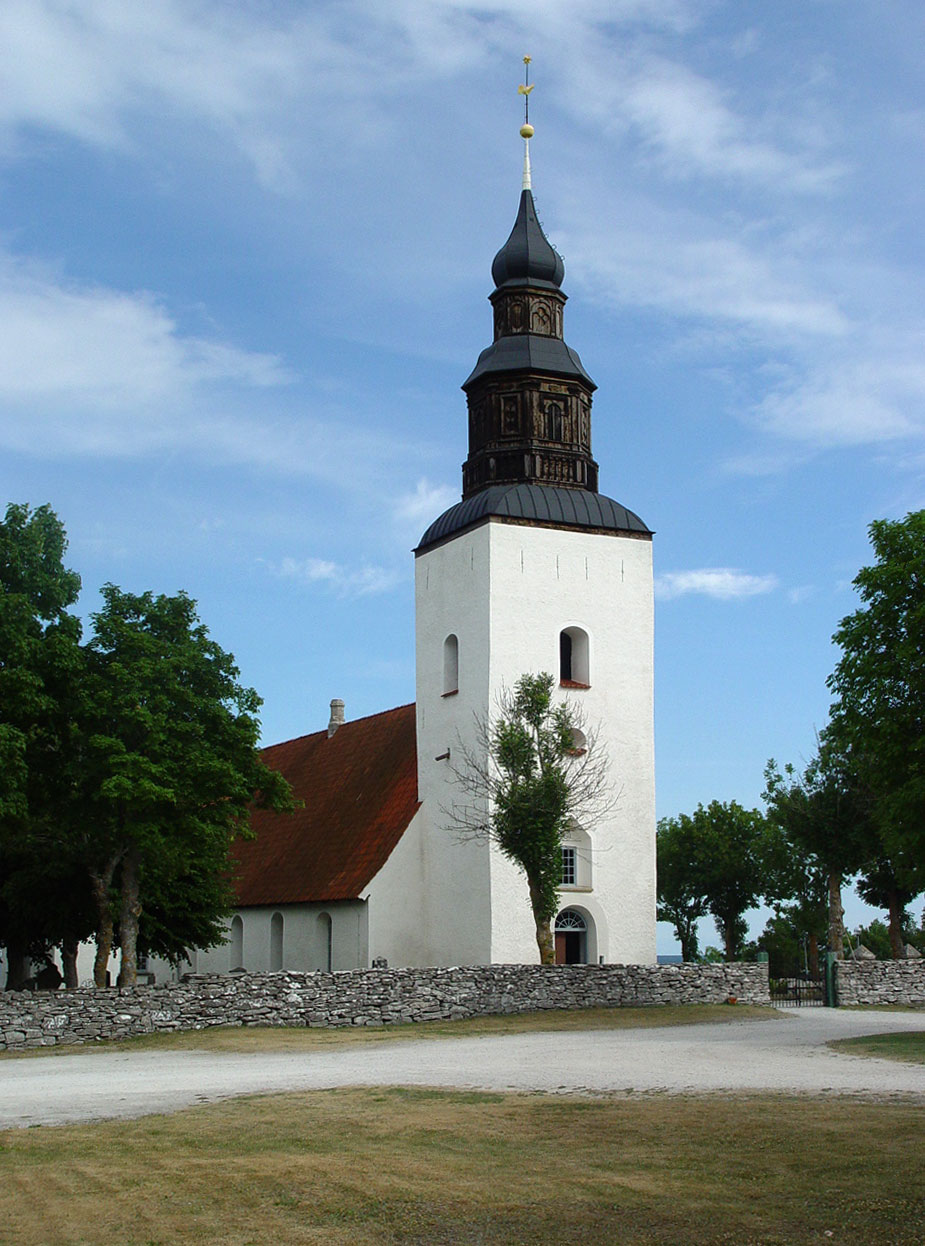
Fårö Church

The island is separated from Gotland by the narrow Fårö-strait, and connected by two car ferries, operated by the Swedish Transport Administration. It has a total area of 111.35 square kilometres (42.99 square miles), of which 9.7 square kilometres (3.7 square miles) are water areas or islets.

On the islands of Fårö and Gotland are rock formations called rauk. They are a result of erosion during the Ice age and are unique to Gotland and Fårö.

The medieval Fårö Church is on Fårö. As of 2019, Fårö Church along with Gotska Sandön Chapel on Gotska Sandön belongs to Fårö parish in Norra Gotlands pastorat.

One of the asteroids in the Asteroid belt, 9358 Fårö, is named after the island.

== Etymology ==
The name Fårö (in Gutnish Faroy) is derived from the words ö, meaning island, and probably far-, which is a word stem associated with travel like in the Swedish verb fara ('to travel'). The word Fårö likely means 'the island one has to travel to' or 'the traveler's island'. Mainland Swedes might misinterpret the name Fårö to be derived from får, the (standard) Swedish word for sheep, due to the many sheep on the island. That word is absent from Modern Gutnish, which uses the word lamm (which in Swedish means 'lamb').

== Demographics ==
Total Population of Fårö
Year	Population
1985	614
1986	630
1987	-
1988	641
1989	629
1990	641
1991	644
1992	653
1993	659
1994	646
1995	643
1996	646
1997	630
1998	618
1999	614
2000	612
2001	594
2002	599
2003	584
2004	573
2005	578
2006	573
2007	578
2008	573
2009	569
2010	548
2011	533
2012	551
2013	527
2014	524
2015	504
2016	498
2017	498
2018	501
2019	497
2020	492
2021	505

== Military past ==
Carl Linnaeus spent two days in 1741 in Fårö during the expedition in which he surveyed the strategic and military resources of Gotland.

Until the 1990s, Fårö and the North of Gotland were off-limits to foreigners because of a government military installation there. There were large, multilingual signs at the side of the roads informing visitors of this and the prohibition was strictly enforced. After the Cold War ended, the installation (Swedish Coastal Artillery regiment KA 3) was mostly shut down. A relic of the island's military past is a 203 metres (666 ft) tall radio mast at Holmudden at 57°57′33″N 19°20′46″E.

== Cinematic heritage ==
Swedish filmmaker Ingmar Bergman lived and died on Fårö and several of his films were filmed there, among them Through a Glass Darkly (1961), Persona (1966), Hour of the Wolf (1968), Shame (1968), The Passion of Anna (1969), and Scenes from a Marriage (1973), as well as Liv Ullmann’s Faithless (2000), based on a Bergman screenplay. The Bergman Week is a tribute to the filmmaker held on the island every June. Fårö itself is the subject of Bergman's documentary films Fårö Document (1970) and Fårö Document 1979.

Andrei Tarkovsky wanted to film The Sacrifice on Fårö but was denied access by the military, so it was filmed further south on Gotland at När instead.

Mia Hansen-Løve filmed and set her film Bergman Island (2021) on Fårö.

== Tourism ==
An annual event on Fårö is "Fårönatta" (Fårö Night), held in September, during which restaurants and bars stay open all night, craft stands are set up and the church holds a midnight Mass.

== Places of interest ==
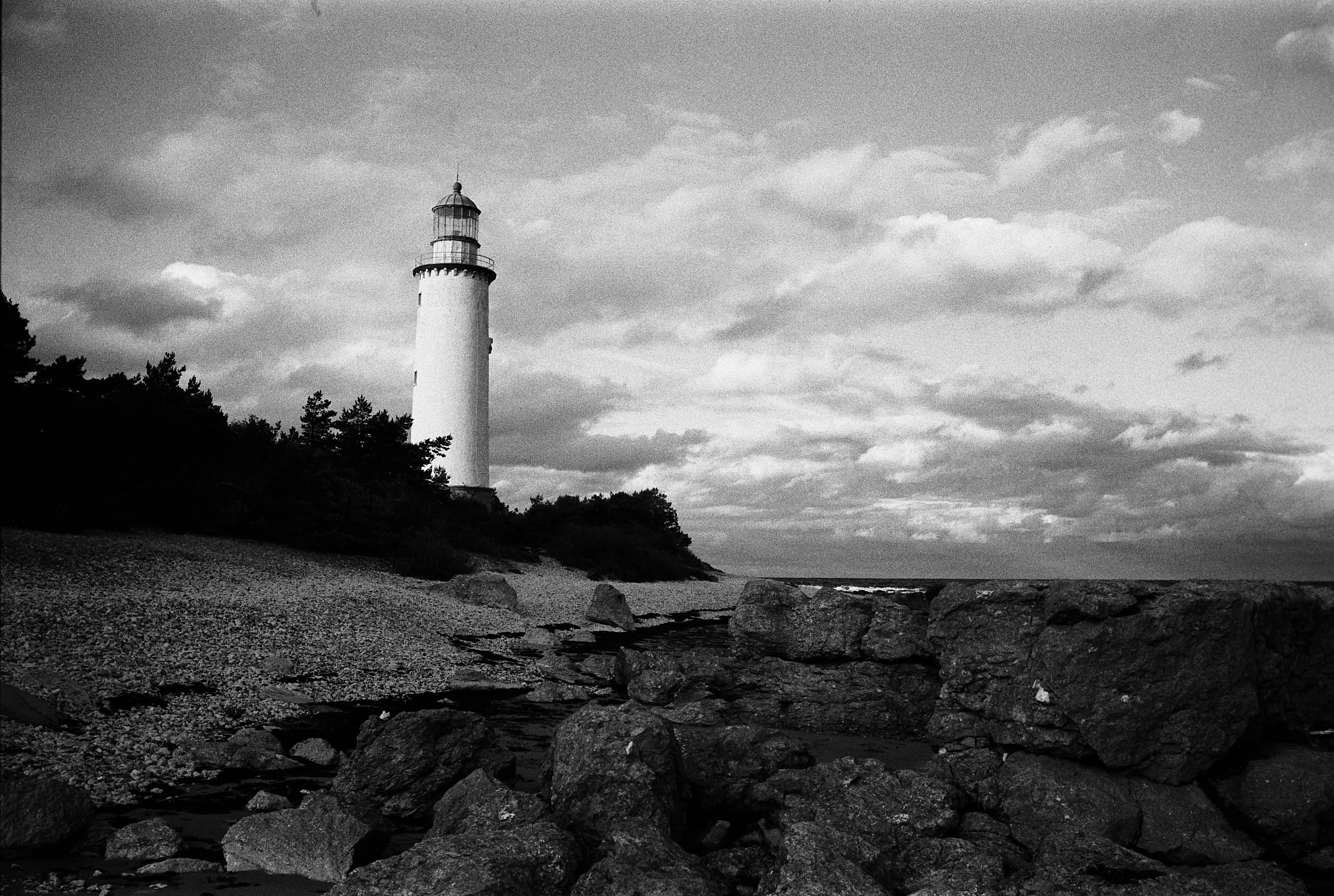
Fårö Fyr

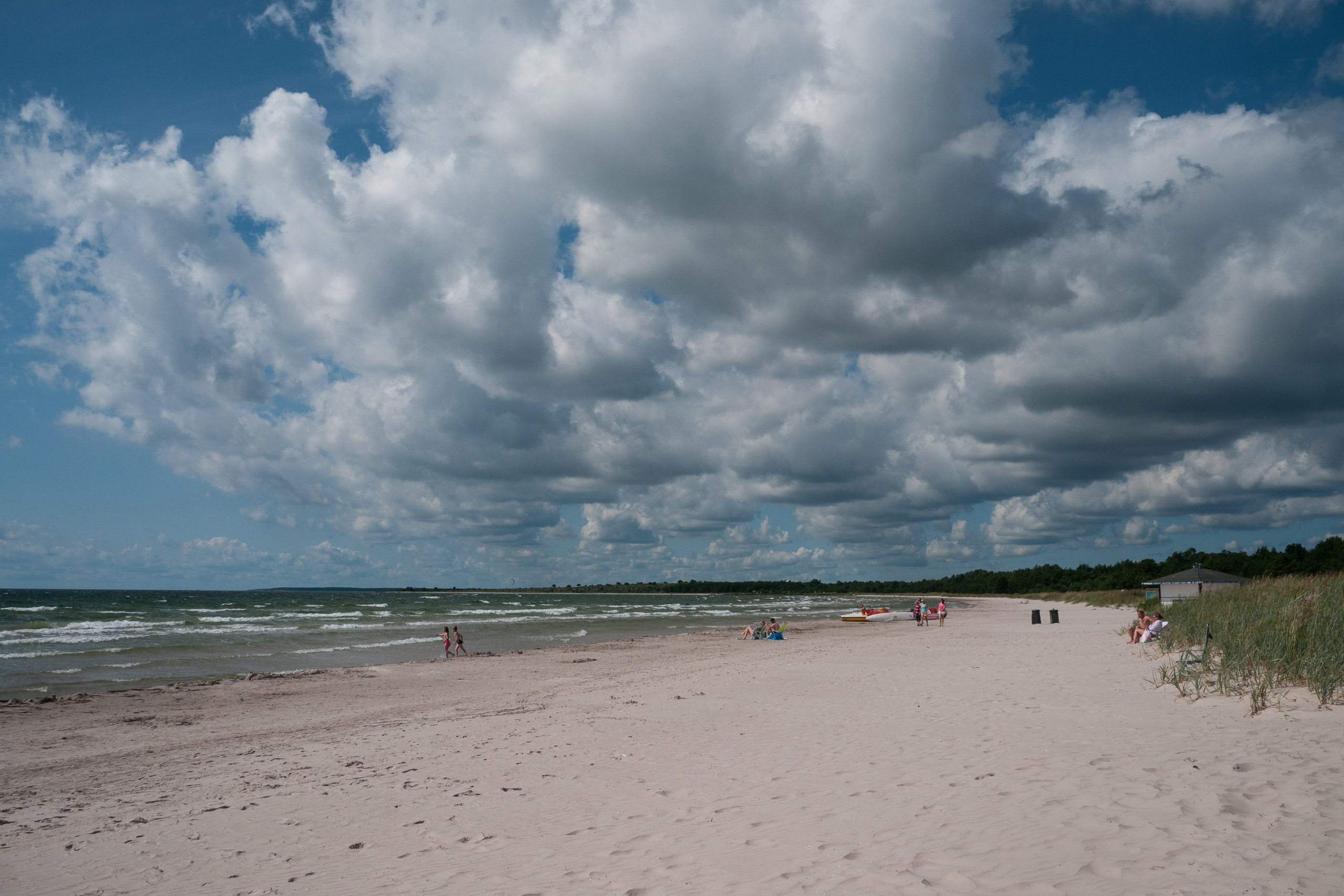
Sudersand

=== Digerhuvud ===
The Digerhuvud coast with Bjärge nature reserve is the largest stack area in Sweden, with hundreds of stacks along a 3.5 km (2.2 mi) part of the coast. Close by is the Helgumannen fishing village. The coast is not suited for swimming due to its depth (up to 80 metres (260 feet) close to the shore), and its strong currents.

An asteroid in the Asteroid belt, 10102 Digerhuvud, is named after the area.

=== Fårö Lighthouse ===
The Fårö Lighthouse lies on the island's northeastern point. It is 30 metres (98 feet) high and was built in 1846 and 1847.

=== Langhammars ===
The Langhammars peninsula and the Langhammars nature reserve on north-western Fårö are rocky beaches with Ice age stone monoliths known as rauks. Langhammars was the setting for Ingmar Bergman's film Shame.

=== Sudersand ===
The long, sandy Sudersand beach on north-eastern Fårö lies next to Sudersands Semesterby which rents cabins to tourists.
