= Persona (1966 film) =

1966 film by Ingmar Bergman

- Theatrical release poster
- Directed by: Ingmar Bergman
- Written by: Ingmar Bergman
- Produced by: Ingmar Bergman
- Starring: Bibi Andersson; Liv Ullmann
- Cinematography: Sven Nykvist
- Edited by: Ulla Ryghe
- Music by: Lars Johan Werle
- Production company: AB Svensk Filmindustri
- Distributed by: AB Svensk Filmindustri
- Release date: 31 August 1966
- Running time: 84 minutes
- Country: Sweden
- Language: Swedish
- Box office: $250,000 (U.S.)

Persona is a 1966 Swedish psychological drama film (Note: The film has been described as psychological drama, horror, psychological horror, melodrama, and experimental film, with elements to appeal to patrons of art films. It has also been categorized as a tragedy, with Professor Robert Boyers writing "Persona is a film, but it is certainly our purest modern example of tragic art".) written, directed, and produced by Ingmar Bergman and starring Bibi Andersson and Liv Ullmann. The story revolves around a young nurse named Alma (Andersson) and her patient, well-known stage actress Elisabet Vogler (Ullmann), who has suddenly stopped speaking. They move to a cottage, where Alma cares for Elisabet, confides in her, and begins having trouble distinguishing herself from her patient.

Characterized by elements of psychological drama, Persona has been the subject of much critical analysis, interpretation, and debate. The avant-garde film's exploration of duality, insanity, and personal identity has been interpreted as reflecting the Jungian theory of persona and dealing with issues related to filmmaking, vampirism, homosexuality, motherhood, abortion, and other subjects. The experimental style of its prologue, storytelling, and end has also been noted. The enigmatic film has been called the Mount Everest of cinematic analysis; according to film historian Peter Cowie, "Everything one says about Persona may be contradicted; the opposite will also be true". (Note: Professor Thomas Elsaesser likened the piece to Mount Everest and Citizen Kane in his essay for The Criterion Collection. Cowie is quoted by academic Frank Gado and editor Lloyd Michaels, who found some exaggeration in Cowie's claim but agreed with the sentiment of the challenges of interpretation.)

Bergman wrote Persona with Ullmann and Andersson in mind for the lead roles and the idea of exploring their identities, and shot the film in Stockholm and Fårö in 1965. In production, the filmmakers experimented with effects, using smoke and a mirror to frame one scene and combining the lead characters' faces in post-production for one shot. Andersson defended a sexually explicit monologue in the screenplay and rewrote portions of it.

When first released, Persona was edited because of its controversial subject matter. It received positive reviews at its initial release, with Swedish press outlets coining the word Person(a)kult to describe its enthusiastic admirers. It won Best Film at the 4th Guldbagge Awards, and was Sweden's entry for the Academy Award for Best Foreign Language Film. The censored content was reinstated in English-language restorations in 2001. Over time, Persona has received widespread critical acclaim, especially for Bergman's direction, screenplay, and narrative, Nykvist's cinematography, and Andersson's and Ullmann's performances. Many critics consider Persona one of the greatest films ever made, Bergman's magnum opus, and a work of art of experimental cinema. Andersson's and Ullmann's performances are considered two of the best female performances in movie history. It was ranked the 5th-greatest film of all time in Sight & Sound's 1972 poll, and 17th in 2012. Persona influenced many directors, including Robert Altman, David Lynch, and Denis Villeneuve.

== Plot ==
A projector begins screening a series of images, including a crucifixion, a spider and the killing of a lamb, and a boy wakes up in a hospital or morgue. He sees a large screen with a blurry image of two women. One of the women may be Alma, a young nurse assigned by a doctor to care for Elisabet Vogler. Elisabet is a stage actress who has suddenly stopped speaking (while playing Electra onstage) and moving, which the doctors have determined is the result of willpower rather than physical or mental illness.

In the hospital, Elisabet is distressed by television images of a man's self-immolation during the Vietnam War. Alma reads her a letter from Elisabet's husband that contains a photo of their son, and the actress tears the photograph up. The doctor speculates that Elisabet may recover better in a cottage by the sea, and sends her there with Alma.

At the cottage, Alma tells Elisabet that no one has ever really listened to her before. She talks about her fiancé, Karl-Henrik, and her first affair. Alma tells a story of how, while she was already in a relationship with Karl-Henrik, she sunbathed in the nude with Katarina, a woman she had just met. Two young boys appeared, and Katarina initiated an orgy. Alma became pregnant, had an abortion, and continues to feel guilty.

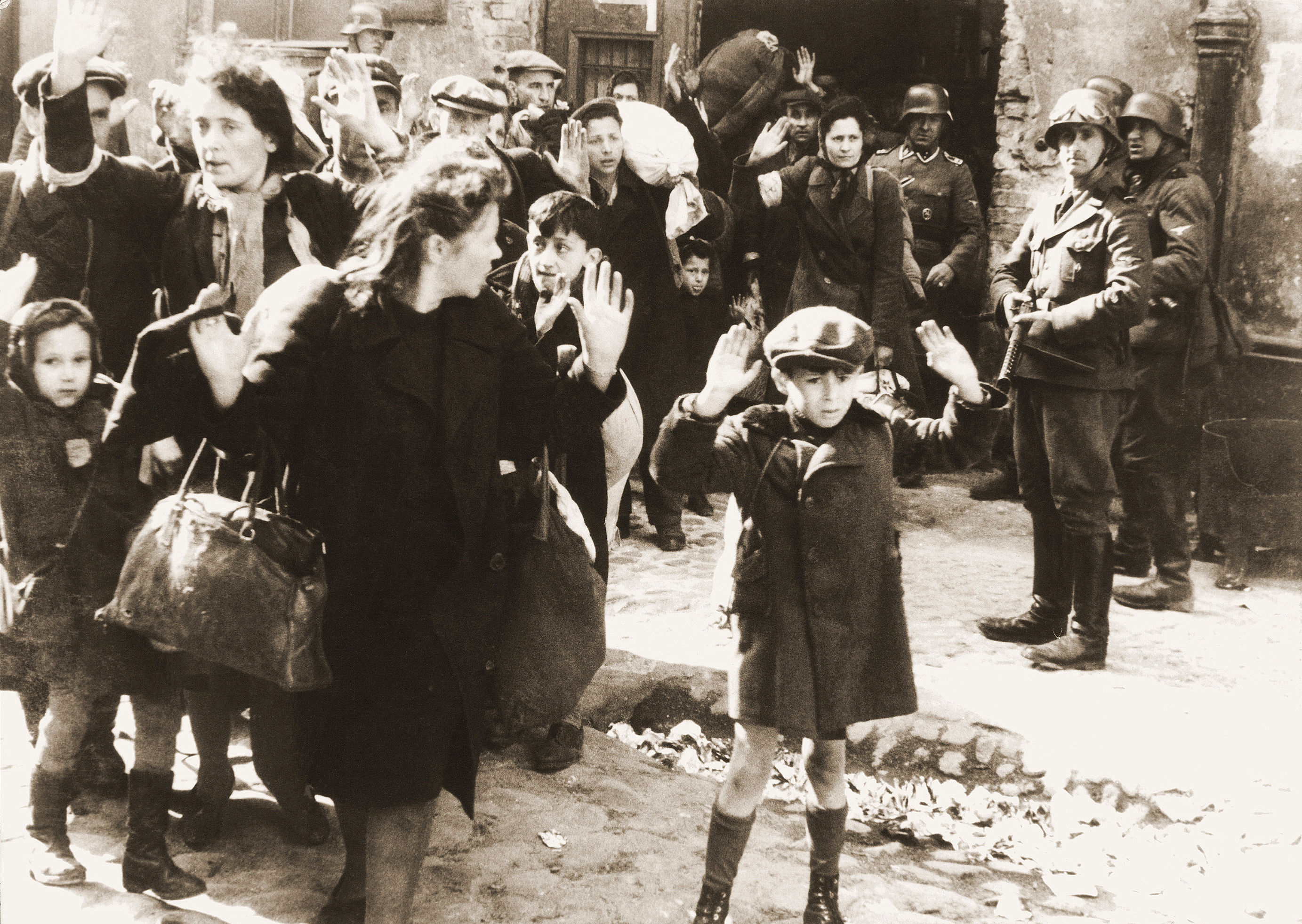
Stroop Report photograph, found by Elisabet, of Polish Jews captured by Germans after the Warsaw Ghetto uprising

Alma drives to town to mail their letters and notices that Elisabet's is not sealed. She reads the letter, which says that Elisabet is "studying" Alma and mentions her story about the orgy and abortion. Furious, Alma accuses Elisabet of using her.

In the resulting fight, she threatens to scald Elisabet with boiling water but stops when Elisabet begs her not to. This is the first time Alma is certain the actress has spoken since they met, though she thought Elisabet previously whispered to her when Alma was half-asleep. Alma tells her that she knows Elisabet is a terrible person; when Elisabet runs off, Alma chases her and begs for forgiveness. Later, Elisabet looks at a photograph of Jews arrested in the Warsaw Ghetto from the Stroop Report.

One night, Alma hears a man outside calling for Elisabet; it is Elisabet's husband. He calls Alma "Elisabet" and, though the nurse tells him he is mistaken, they have sex. Alma meets with Elisabet to talk about why Elisabet tore up the photo of her son. Alma tells much of Elisabet's story: that she wanted the only thing she did not have, motherhood, and became pregnant. Regretting her decision, Elisabet attempted a failed self-induced abortion and gave birth to a boy whom she despises, but who craves her love. Alma ends the story in distress, asserting her identity and denying that she is Elisabet. She later coaxes Elisabet to say the word "nothing", and leaves the cottage as a crew films Elisabet and the projector from the prologue stops running.

== Cast ==
- Bibi Andersson as Alma, the nurse
- Liv Ullmann as Elisabet Vogler, the actress
- Margaretha Krook as The Doctor
- Gunnar Björnstrand as Mr. Vogler
- Jörgen Lindström as The Boy, Elisabet's son

== Themes and interpretations ==
Persona has been subject to a variety of interpretations. According to Professor Thomas Elsaesser, the film "has been for film critics and scholars what climbing Everest is for mountaineers: the ultimate professional challenge. Besides Citizen Kane, it is probably the most written-about film in the canon". Critic Peter Cowie wrote, "Everything one says about Persona may be contradicted; the opposite will also be true". Academic Frank Gado called Cowie's assessment "patent nonsense", but agreed there was "critical disarray"; editor Lloyd Michaels said that although Cowie exaggerated somewhat, he welcomed the "critical license" to study the film.

Michaels summarized what he calls "the most widely held view" of Persona: that it is "a kind of modernist horror movie". Elisabet's condition, described by a doctor as "the hopeless dream to be", is "the shared condition of both life and film art". Film scholar Marc Gervais has suggested several possible interpretations: "a metaphor of the subconscious or unconscious", "one personality consuming the other", "the fusing of two personalities into one", or "the different sides of the same personality fleetingly merging". Gado suggested that Persona was "an investigation of schizophrenia, a story about lesbian attraction, or a parable about the artist".

Bergman said that although he had an idea of what the story meant, he would not share it because he felt that his audience should draw its own conclusions. He hoped the film would be felt rather than understood.

The "silence of God" is a theme Bergman explored extensively in his previous work. According to author Paul Coates, Persona was the "aftermath" of that exploration. Gervais added that Persona and other Bergman films between 1965 and 1970 were not "God-centred". Gervais also quoted philosopher Friedrich Nietzsche as a guide to understanding Persona: "Belief in the absolute immorality of Nature, in lack of purpose, and in meaninglessness, is the affect psychologically necessary once belief in God and an essentially moral order is no longer supportable".

=== Identity and duality ===
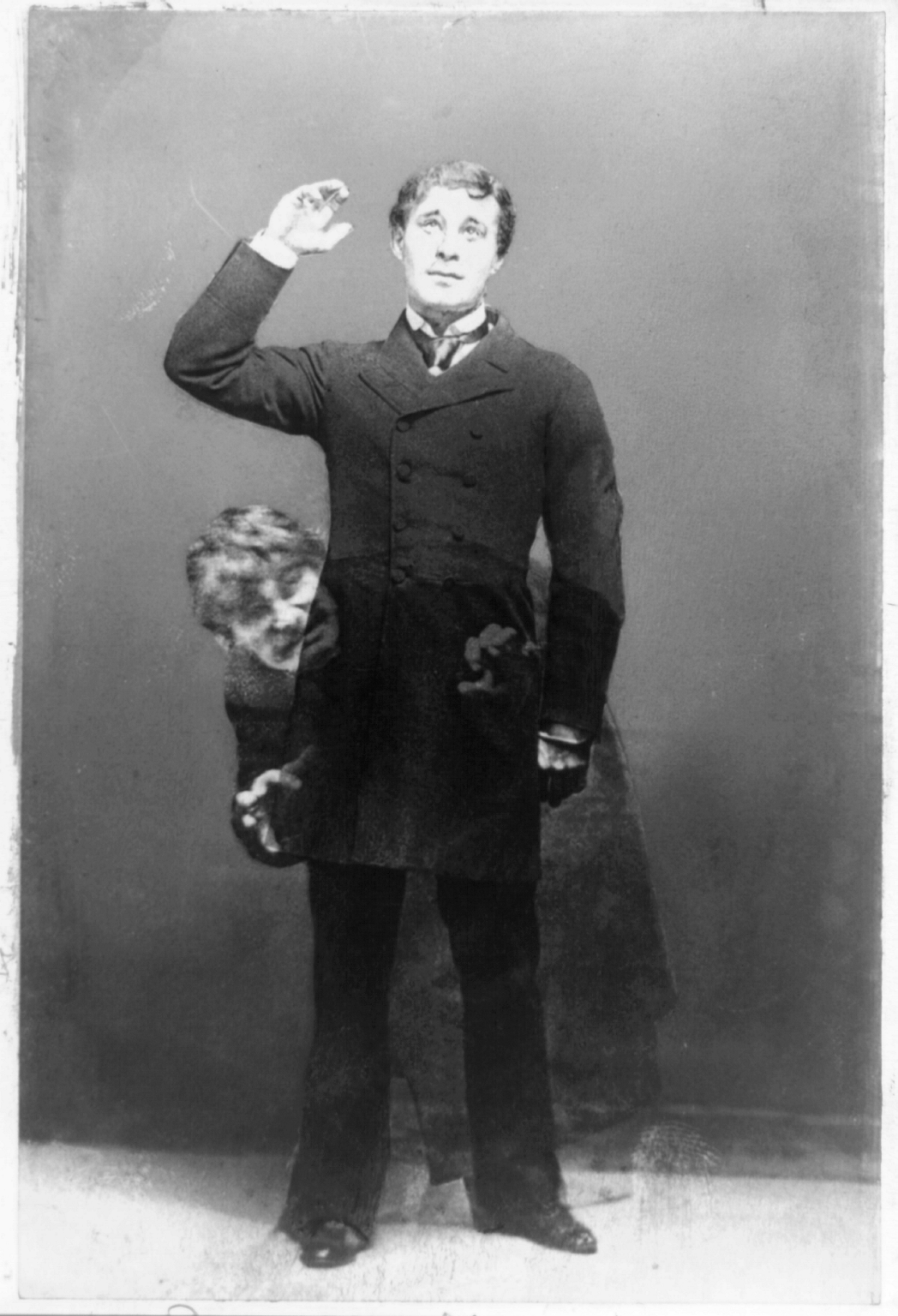
Professor Irving Singer compared Bergman's merged characters to Dr. Jekyll and Mr. Hyde.

Analysis has focused on the characters' resemblance, demonstrated in shots of overlapping faces in which one face is visible and part of another is seen behind it, suggesting the possibility that the characters are one, and their duality. Critic John Simon commented, "This duality can be embodied in two persons, as it is here, but it has a distinct relevance to the contradictory aspects of a single person". If they are one person, the questions exist of whether Alma is fantasizing about the actress she admires, Elisabet is examining her psyche, or the boy is trying to understand his mother. Susan Sontag suggested that Persona is a series of variations on the theme of "doubling". According to Sontag, the film's subject is "violence of the spirit". Professor Irving Singer, examining the shot in which Alma and Elisabet's faces are combined, compared its repulsive effect to that of seeing Robert Louis Stevenson's character Mr. Hyde instead of his benign alter ego, Dr. Jekyll. Singer wrote that Bergman expanded on Stevenson's exploration of duality, the "good and evil, light and dark aspects of our nature", depicting it as "oneness" in the shot.

Gado saw Persona as a "double-threaded process of discovery involving motherhood". Elisabet's withdrawal into silence could be her rejection of motherhood, the only role the actress could not slough off. The nurse realizes that she has done what Elisabet tried and failed to do: erase a child from her life by abortion. Psychiatrist Barbara Young viewed the boy in the morgue in the film's prologue as a stand-in for Bergman, in a morgue he remembered, reaching out to his mother. Young compared Bergman's relationship with his mother, Karin, to Alma ("hungry for someone to listen to her and to love her") and Elisabet ("ravenous for precious time"). (Note: Themes of family "neglect and abandonment" run in Bergman's works, including Persona, Through a Glass Darkly, The Silence, The Passion of Anna, Autumn Sonata and From the Life of the Marionettes.)

About the theme of duality, author Birgitta Steene wrote that Alma represents the soul and Elisabet is a "stern" goddess. Theologian Hans Nystedt called Elisabet a symbol of God, and Alma symbolic of mortal consciousness. Coates noted the "female face" or "near-Goddess" succeeding the God previously studied by Bergman, referring to Jungian theories to examine the themes of duality and identity; two different people, with a "grounding in oneself", trade identities. Coates described Elisabet as a fusion of the mythological figures Thanatos and Eros, with Alma as her "hapless counterpart", and a close-up suggesting death.

=== Psychology ===
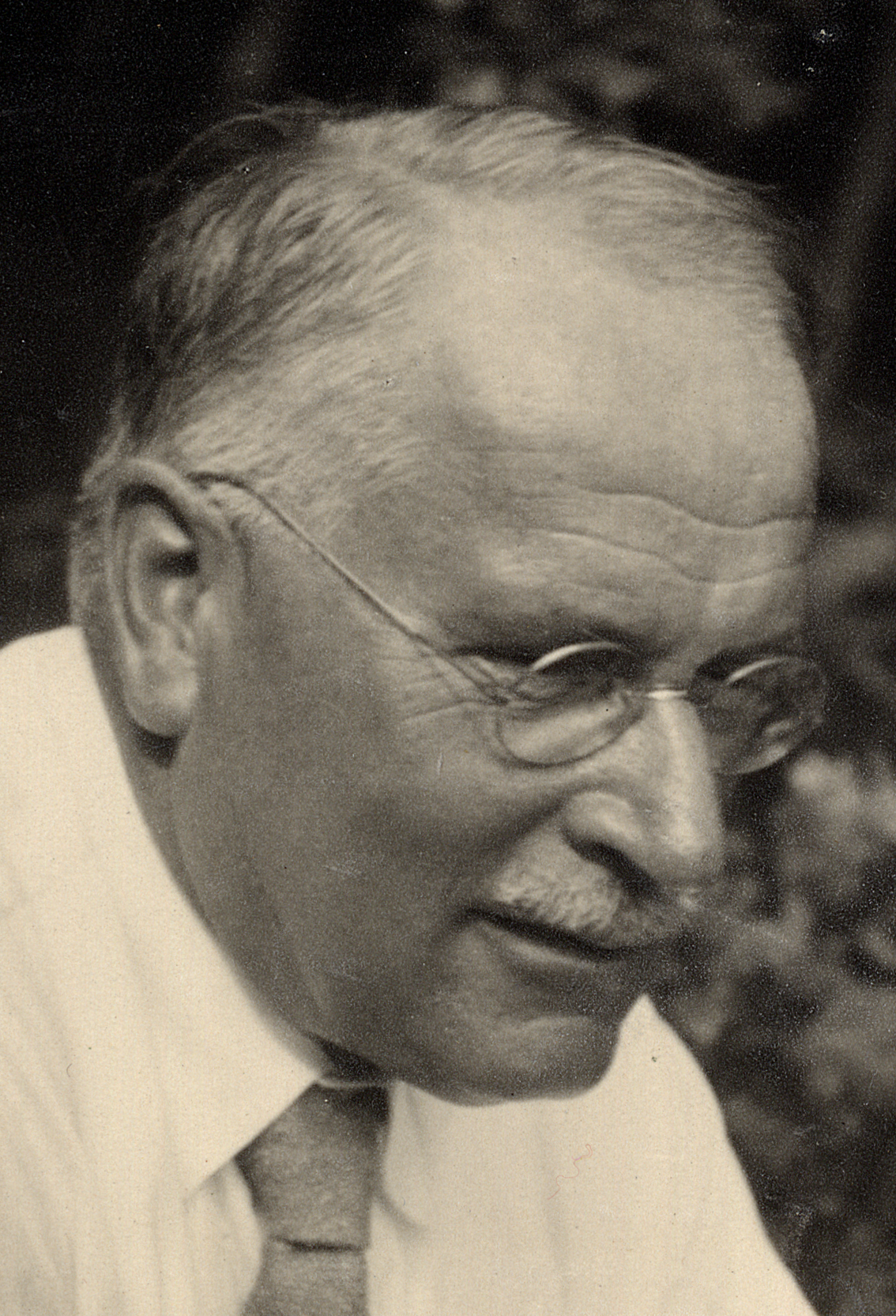
Carl Jung's theory of persona influenced the film's title and interpretations.

Persona's title reflects the Latin word for "mask" and Carl Jung's theory of persona, an external identity separate from the soul ("alma"). Jung believed that people project public images to protect themselves, and can come to identify with their personae. An interviewer asked Bergman about the Jungian connotations of the film's title, acknowledging an alternative interpretation that it references persona masks worn by actors in ancient drama, but saying that Jung's concept "admirably" matched the film. Bergman agreed, saying that Jung's theory "fits well in this case". Coates also connected masks to themes of identity and duality: "The mask is Janus-faced".

Alma's secret is revealed in her orgy monologue, and critic Robin Wood related it to a combination of shame and nostalgia perhaps indicating the character's sexual liberation. According to Wood, the incident touched on unfaithfulness and juvenile sexuality; in Swedish, the young boys are called "pojkar" and are in need of coaching. Arnold Weinstein wrote that Alma's story is the hardest-hitting example of the "cracks" in the character's mask, belying her persona of a nurse and leading to a "collapse of self". Her monologue is so intense that it verges on pornography, although there is no depiction of the sexual escapade.

Cinema historian P. Adams Sitney summarized the story as following the course of psychoanalysis: a referral, followed by the first interview, disclosures, transference, and the discovery of the patient's root problem. According to Sitney, the story seems to begin from Alma's point of view; after Elisabet compares their hands, her point of view is revealed as the source of the story.

Another possible reference to psychology is that when Elisabet falls mute, the play she is in is Electra by Sophocles or Euripides. According to Wood, Bergman did not focus on Greek tragedy in his work but the character of Electra inspired the idea of the Electra complex. Sitney felt that Bergman's choice of play related to "sexual identities", a key concept in psychoanalysis.

=== Gender and sexuality ===
The story contains Bergman's motif of "warring women", seen earlier in The Silence and later in Cries and Whispers and Autumn Sonata. According to Professor Marilyn Johns Blackwell, Elisabet's resistance to speaking can be interpreted as resistance to her gender role. By depicting this tension as experienced primarily by women, Bergman may be said to "problematize the position of woman as other"; the role society assigns women is "essentially foreign to their subjecthood". Blackwell wrote that the attraction between Elisabet and Alma and the absence of male sexuality cohere with their identification with each other, creating a doubling that reveals the "multiple, shifting, self-contradictory identity", a notion of identity that undermines male ideology. The theme of merging and doubling surfaces early in the film, when Alma says that she saw one of Elisabet's films and was struck by the thought that they were alike. Blackwell also writes that one of the film's original titles, A Piece of Cinematography, may allude to the nature of representation.

Analysts have noted possible lesbian under- and overtones in the film. Alison Darren profiled Persona in her Lesbian Film Guide, calling Alma and Elisabet's relationship "halfway between love and hate"; they may come close to having sex in one scene, "though this might easily be an illusion". Scholar Gwendolyn Audrey Foster interpreted the film in feminist terms as a depiction of lesbianism, viewing the scene where Elisabet enters Alma's room as seduction. Professor Alexis Luko also felt that the characters' touching and resemblance in the scene, in addition to symbolizing their personalities merging, indicated intimacy and eroticism.

Foster believed that Elisabet's gaze presents Alma with questions about her engagement to Karl-Henrik. According to Foster, sexual encounters between men and women are associated with abortion; lesbian romance has an increasingly shared identity. But if Persona dramatizes a lesbian relationship, it is not clearly favorable, as it is later characterized by narcissism and violence. If lesbianism is considered a stronger version of female friendship, or motherly love, Alma and Elisabet's relationship replaces the depiction of the Oedipus complex in the prologue when the boy reaches for his mother in vain. According to Jeremi Szaniawski, Bergman's use of both gay and lesbian homoeroticism in Persona, Hour of the Wolf, Cries and Whispers and Face to Face was a rebellion against his strict upbringing by Church of Sweden minister Erik Bergman.

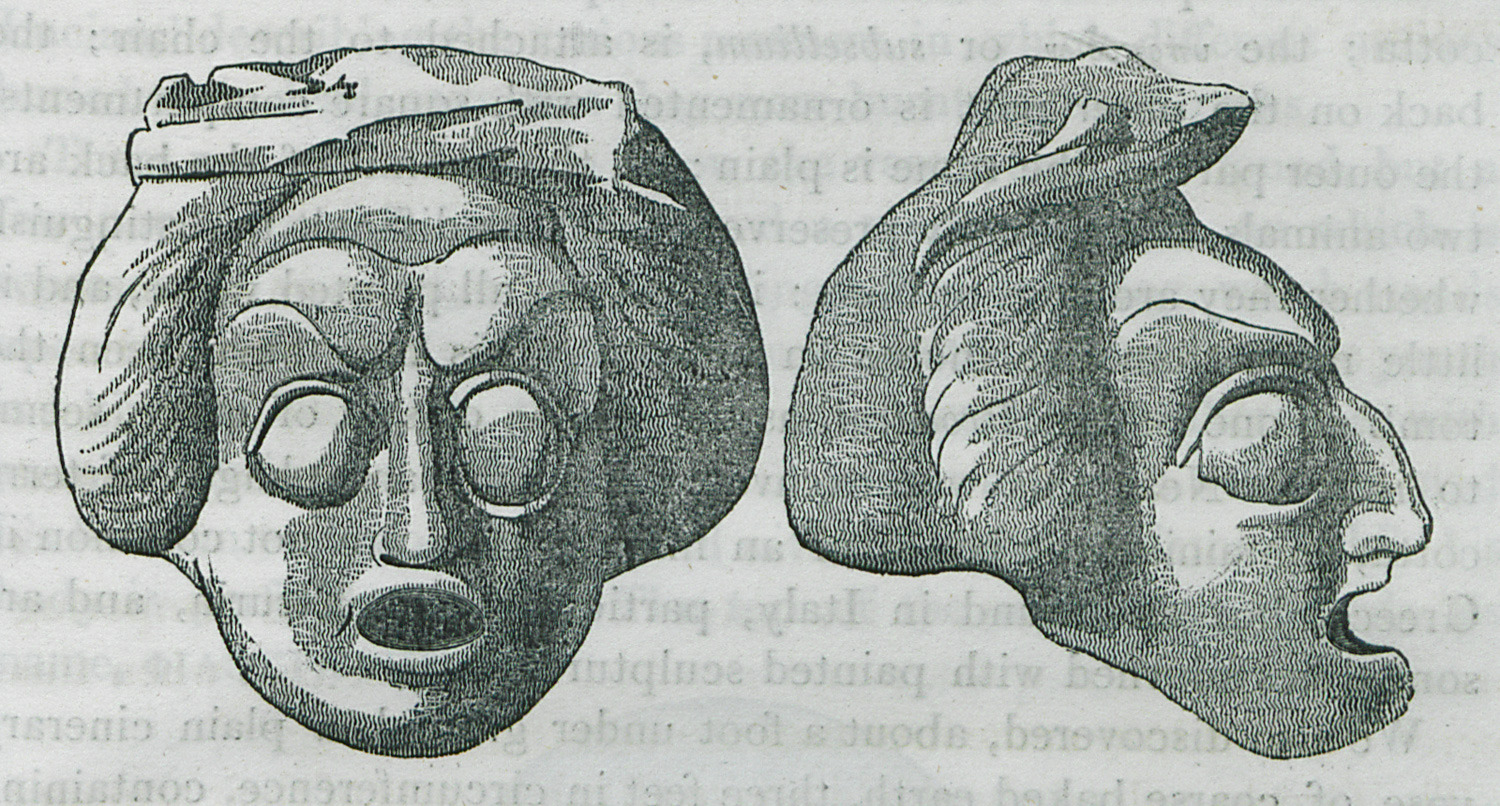
Edward Dodwell's depiction of an ancient Greek mask

=== Art and theatre ===
Persona is the Latin word for "mask" and refers to a mouthpiece actors wore to increase the audibility of their lines. In Greek drama, persona came to mean a character, separate from an actor. Bergman often used the theatre as a setting in his films.

Elisabet is a stage actress and, according to Singer, is seen in "mask-like makeup" suggesting a "theatrical persona". Singer wrote that Elisabet wears "thick and artificial eyelashes" even when she is not acting. Scholar Egil Törnqvist noted that when Elisabet is onstage as Electra, she looks away from the theatre audience and breaks the fourth wall by looking at the camera. According to Törnqvist, Elisabet makes a fist, symbolizing her revolt against the notion of meaningful performance. Singer concluded that although Elisabet develops a very personal relationship with Alma, she cannot shed her persona as an actress and will remain lonely with "the hopeless dream of being".

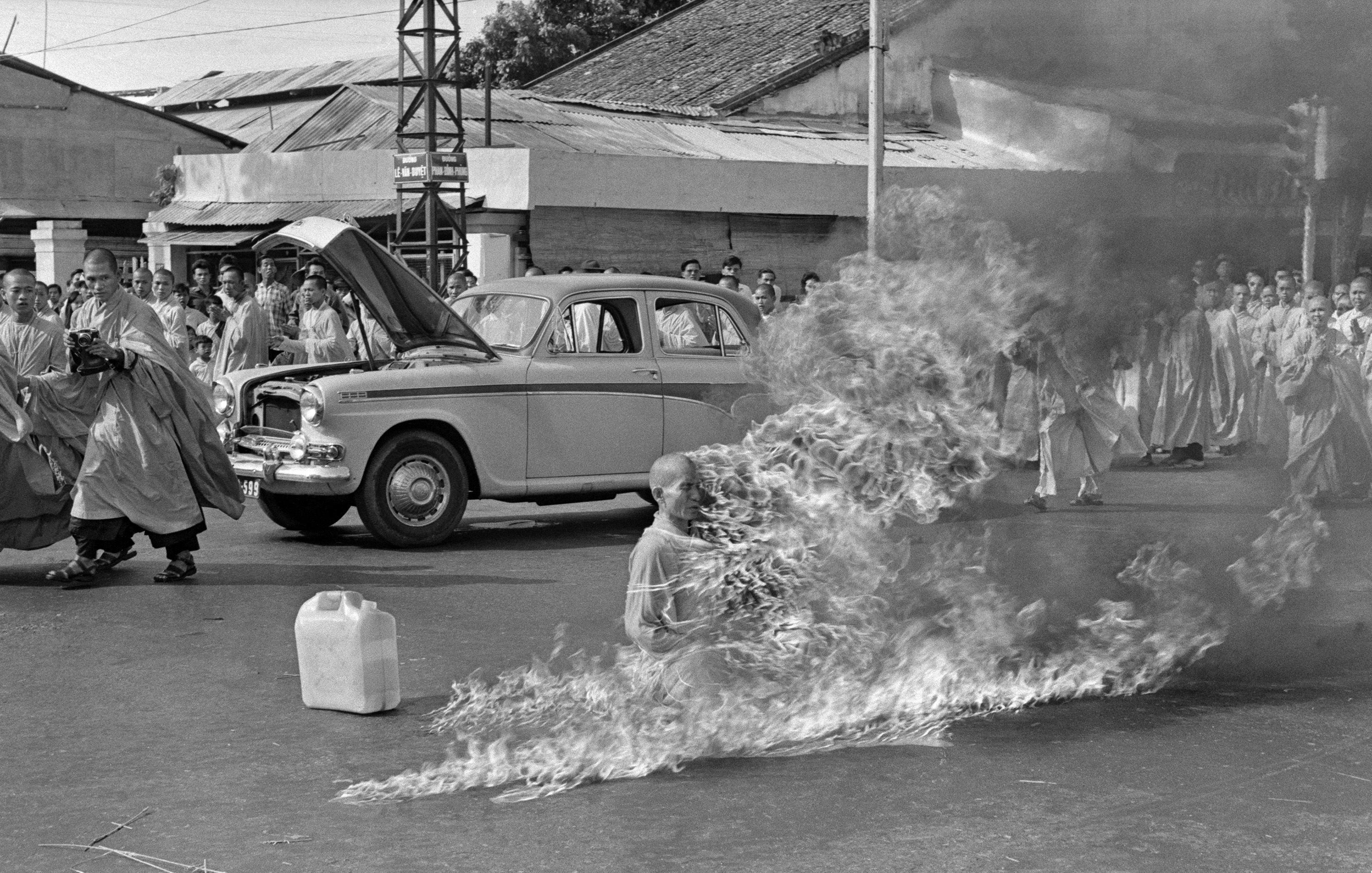
Journalist Malcolm Browne's photograph of Thích Quảng Đức's self-immolation, which Carsten Jensen said is related to Persona's themes.

According to Singer, Bergman confronts his viewers with "the nature of his art form". Literary critic Maria Bergom-Larsson wrote that Persona reflected Bergman's approach to filmmaking. Although Alma initially believes that artists "created out of compassion, out of a need to help", she sees Elisabet laugh at performances on a radio program and finds herself the subject of the actress's study. She rejects her earlier belief: "How stupid of me". As Elisabet studies Alma, Bergman studies them both.

Michaels wrote that Bergman and Elisabet share a dilemma: they cannot respond authentically to "large catastrophes", such as the Holocaust or the Vietnam War. Political columnist Carsten Jensen identified the Vietnam footage Elisabet sees as the 1963 self-immolation of Thích Quảng Đức. According to Jensen, photographs of Quảng Đức's death were widely circulated and were used in Persona. Academic Benton Meadows wrote that Elisabet sees herself in Quảng Đức's death, fearing that it would be a consequence of her silent rebellion. Törnqvist wrote that Elisabet is struck by the truth that the monk is a true rebel, while her rebellion is a cowardly retreat behind a persona of muteness.

=== Vampirism ===
Vampire by Edvard Munch. Persona's themes allude to vampirism.

Persona also includes symbolism of vampirism. In 1973, Dagens Nyheter critic Lars-Olaf Franzen interpreted Alma as a stand-in for the audience and Elisabet as an "irresponsible artist and vampire". According to the British Film Institute, Elisabet "vampiristically" devours Alma's personality; the actress is also seen drinking blood from Alma. Gervais wrote that Persona is "an impressionistic vampire film". Törnqvist called the vampire portrayal "Strindbergian", connecting it to the spider seen in the prologue and the "fat spider" mentioned in the screenplay (but omitted from the final cut). (Note: In the screenplay, though not the finished film, Elisbet writes a letter to the doctor, stating she takes "curiosity in a fat spider". Egil Törnqvist wrote the spider in the prologue is seen under a microscope, indicating it is being coldly examined for scientific purposes, which Törnqvist compared to Elisabet's study of Alma.)

Although psychologist Daniel Shaw interpreted Elisabet as a vampire and Alma as her "sacrificial lamb", Bergman replied when asked if Alma was entirely consumed:

No, she has just provided some blood and meat, and some good steak. Then she can go on. You must know, Elizabeth is intelligent, she's sensible, she has emotions, she is immoral, and she is a gifted woman, but she's a monster because she has an emptiness in her.

== Style ==
Persona has been called an experimental film. Singer acknowledged Marc Gervais's theory that its style is a postmodern rejection of "realistic narration", although he said this was of secondary importance to its commentary on cinema. The Independent journalist Christopher Hooton said that symmetry was used and the fourth wall sometimes broken, quoting essayist Steven Benedict on the use of "reflections, splitting the screen, and shadows". The fourth wall seems to break when Alma and Elisabet look into the camera and when Elisabet takes photographs in the direction of the camera.

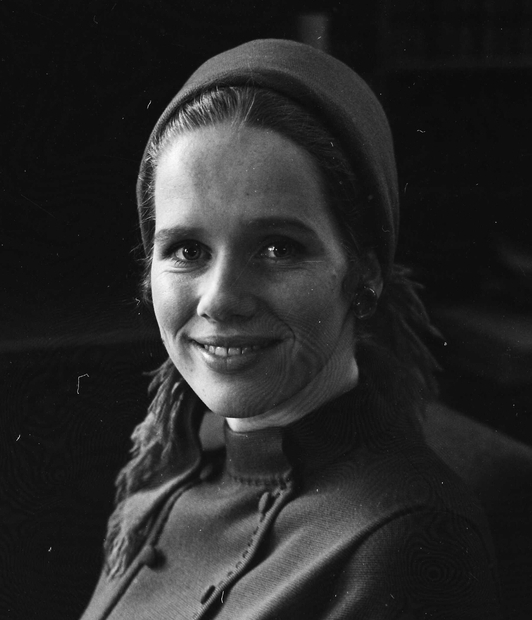
Bergman believed in the importance of the face, and Liv Ullmann said that she was cast because of hers. (Note: Ullmann spoke of why she was cast in the films in 2016. Before the director's death in 2007, Ullmann starred in 11 of his works and became known as his muse. Roger Ebert remarked Bergman and Ullmann's "lives have been intertwined since Persona, and that's been the most important fact in ... [Ullmann's] artistic life", and they also had a daughter, Linn Ullmann.)

The BFI called Persona "stylistically radical", noting its use of close-ups. Senses of Cinema journalist Hamish Ford also noted its "radical aesthetics", citing a "genuinely avant-garde prologue". Critic Geoff Pevere called the prologue "one of the most audacious reset clicks in movie history". He summarized the blankness before a projector runs, leading to clips of classic animation, a comedic silent film, crucifixion, and a penis, concluding that it summarized cinema. The montage's imagery is "rapid-fire", with Bergman saying the penis is onscreen for one-sixth of a second and intended to be "subliminal". Multiple writers have argued that Bergman's slaughtered sheep is meant to evoke the one in Luis Buñuel's Un Chien Andalou. The personification of Death was used in Bergman's 1949 film Prison. (Note: While the same personification of Death appears in Persona and Prison, the lighthearted version in Prison contrasts with the version in The Seventh Seal, played by Bengt Ekerot. With personifications of "mortality" common in Bergman's films, the original ending of Persona called for an elderly character with an ax to join Alma on the island.) Michaels linked the spider in the prologue with the "spider-god" in Bergman's 1961 Through a Glass Darkly. (Note: The spider-god in Through a Glass Darkly, which Michaels connected to the Persona prologue, is mentioned when the schizophrenic character Karin, played by Harriet Andersson, expects to meet God and instead has a vision of a monstrous spider. In Bergman's next film, Winter Light (1963), the spider-god is referenced again, where the character Tomas, played by Gunnar Björnstrand, relates his notion of a spider-god to suffering, as opposed to his previous ideas of a God of love that provides comfort.) Törnqvist said that the spider is visible under a microscope, indicating its use for study. When the boy reaches out to his mother, it is to shift photographs of Ullmann and Andersson. In addition to the prologue, the story is interrupted by a midpoint celluloid break.

Scenes creating a "strange" or "eerie" effect include Elisabet entering Alma's room, where it is uncertain if she is sleepwalking or Alma is having a dream, and Mr. Vogler having sex with Alma; it is uncertain if he mistook her for Elisabet. Other scenes are "dreamlike—sometimes nightmarish". The story's small scale is supplemented with references to external horrors, such as images of self-immolation—included in the opening sequence and the hospital scene—and the Holocaust photograph, the subject of increasing close-ups.

Biographer Jerry Vermilye wrote that despite experimenting with color in 1964's All These Women, Persona represented Bergman and Nykvist's return to the "stark black-and-white austerity of earlier chamber pieces". They include Through a Glass Darkly, Winter Light and The Silence, with Vermilye calling Persona a sequel to the "trilogy". Bergman returned to Through a Glass Darkly's Fårö for its backdrop, which he used symbolically. (Note: Bergman used Fårö as a filming location for the first time in his 1961 Through a Glass Darkly, at cinematographer Sven Nykvist's recommendation. Following Persona, he returned to shooting in Fårö for Hour of the Wolf (1968), Shame (1968), The Passion of Anna (1969), Fårö Document (1969) and The Touch (1971). Fårö Document is a documentary, while the others use the island for symbolism and have been termed the "island films".) According to Professor John Orr, an island setting offered "boldness and fluidity" that brought different dynamics to the drama. Orr wrote that the "island romanticism" was a transition from Bergman's earlier films into "dream and abstraction". Examining the visuals and the depiction of social isolation and mourning, critics Christopher Heathcote and Jai Marshall found parallels to Edvard Munch's paintings.

According to Vineberg, Ullmann and Andersson's acting styles are dictated by the fact that Andersson does nearly all the talking. She delivers monologues, and Ullmann is a "naturalistic mime". A notable exception is when Elisabet is coaxed into saying the word "nothing", which Vineberg called ironic. Elisabet speaks only 14 words; Bergman said, "The human face is the great subject of the cinema. Everything is there". Vineberg wrote that the performances use the "mirror exercise", in which the actresses look directly at each other; one makes facial movements which the other tries to imitate. Ford wrote that Ullmann's performance is defined by "twitching lips, ambivalent gazes and vampyric desire".

Bach's Violin Concerto in E major
Performed by the Advent Chamber Orchestra with violinist Jacques Israelievitch

Music and other sounds also define Bergman's style. This includes the prologue, with a "discordant" score accompanied by dripping and a ringing telephone. In the scene where Elisabet meets Alma in her bedroom, foghorns accompany Werle's music. Musicologist Alexis Luko described the score as conveying "semantic meaning" with diabolus in musica ("the devil in music"), a common style in horror cinema. The addition of a foghorn indicates a meeting of "diegetic and non-diegetic", complementing the breaking of the fourth wall when Alma and Elisabet look at the audience. The music Elisabet hears in the hospital, Bach's Violin Concerto in E major, is meant to be "nice and soothing" and divert Elisabet from her mental torment. It fails to comfort; Wood calls it one of Bach's "most somber and tragic utterances", and the scene's lighting darkens accordingly. (Note: Wood, in this analysis of the music of Johann Sebastian Bach in Persona, contrasted it to the use of Bach throughout Bergman's filmography, such as The Silence where the Goldberg Variations play; Cries and Whispers where two sisters touch affectionately to cello music; and Autumn Sonata where it is used in a moment of unity, to conclude Bergman generally used Bach to signify "a possible transcendent wholeness". Alongside Persona, Through a Glass Darkly provides another exception to this usage.) According to Luko, Elisabet's lack of sound (muteness) makes her fit "the cinematic profile of a powerful, pseudo-omniscient mute".

== Production ==
=== Development ===
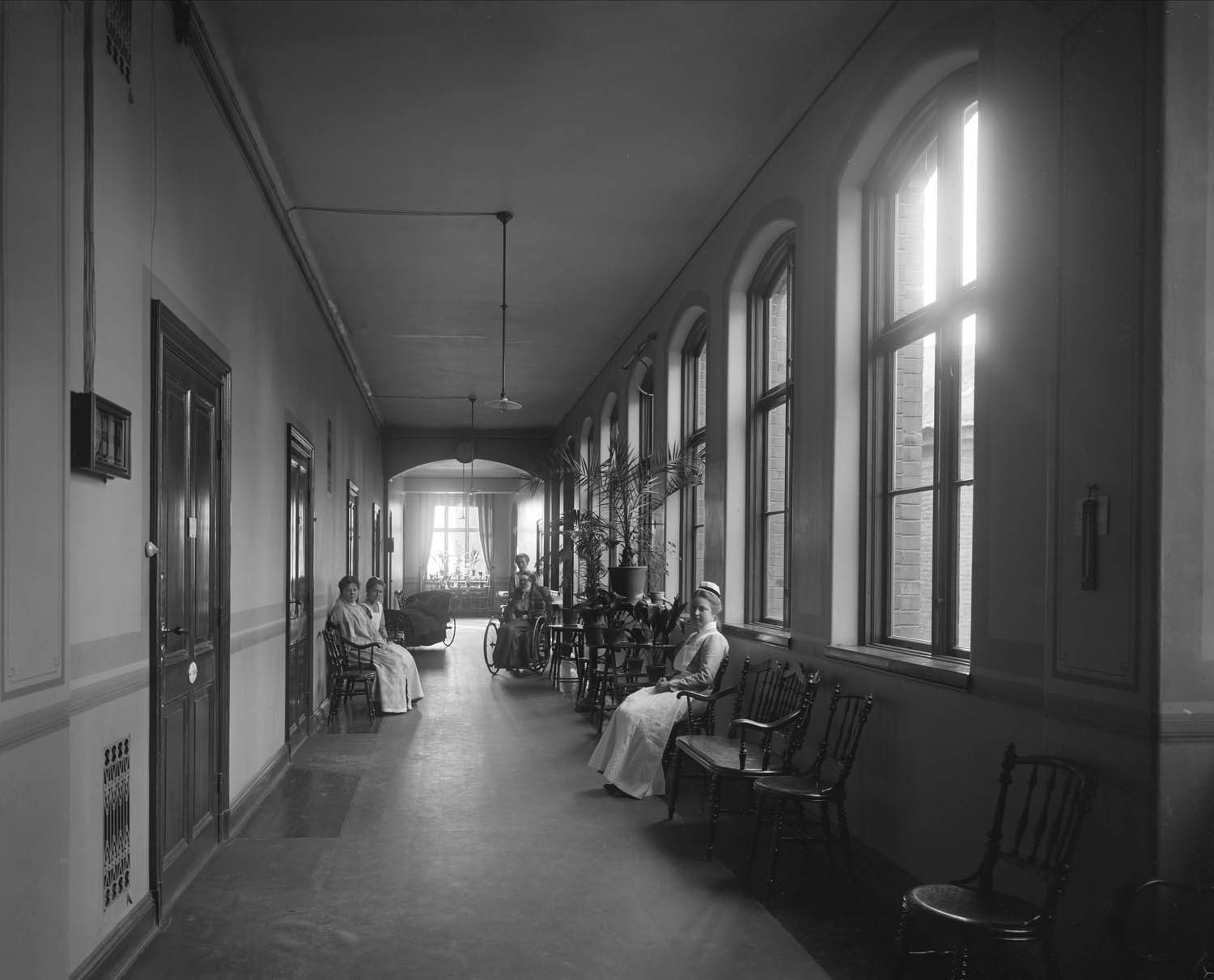
Persona was written at the Sophiahemmet hospital.

According to Bergman, the story had its roots in a chance encounter with past collaborator Bibi Andersson (Note: Bibi Andersson first starred in Bergman's films in 1957 (The Seventh Seal and Wild Strawberries) and The Devil's Eye in 1960, with her saying that he often cast her in naïve roles. She later appeared in The Passion of Anna in 1969 and Scenes from a Marriage in 1973.) in a Stockholm street. Andersson, who was with Liv Ullmann, introduced Ullmann to him. Ullmann placed the meeting in 1964, and said that Bergman recognized her and asked her on the spot if she would like to work with him. He said that an image of the two women formed in his mind; in the hospital, he found an "uncanny resemblance" between the actresses in photographs of them sunbathing. This inspired the beginning of his story, a vision of two women "wearing big hats and laying their hands alongside each other". Andersson said, "Liv and I had worked together before and we were very close". Bergman had been in a romantic relationship with Andersson and was attracted to Ullmann; of Persona's conception, Andersson said, "He saw our friendship, and he wanted to get ... inside of it. Involved".

Bergman wrote Persona in nine weeks while recovering from pneumonia, and much of his work was done in the Sophiahemmet hospital. With this project, he abandoned his practice of writing finished and comprehensive screenplays before photography, allowing the script to develop as production proceeded. In the screenplay, the story ends with the doctor announcing that Elisabet has resumed speaking, reunited with her family, and resumed acting. Alma remains on the island and plans to write Elisabet a letter until she sees the Holocaust photo and abandons her plan. (Note: Authors described this original ending. In the screenplay, instead of writing her letter, Alma then falls back on her maxim: "I'm terribly fond of people. Mostly when they're sick and I can help them. I'll marry and have children. I believe that is what life has in store for me in this world". The last scene featuring Elisabet called for a close-up portraying "A howling wide-open face, distorted by terror, with wild wide-open eyes and furrows of sweat running through her make-up ... [Her] face starts to move, assumes strange contours. The words become meaningless, running and jumping, finally vanishing altogether".) Later in the production, this was replaced by the blood-drinking scene, Elisabet being taught to say the word "nothing" and Alma leaving the island.

Bergman appealed to filmmaker Kenne Fant for funding for the project. Supportive, Fant asked about the film's concept and Bergman shared his vision of women comparing hands. Fant assumed that the film would be inexpensive, and agreed to fund it. In his book Images, Bergman wrote, "Today I feel that in Persona—and later in Cries and Whispers—I had gone as far as I could go. And that in these two instances when working in total freedom, I touched wordless secrets that only the cinema can discover." He also said, "At some time or other, I said that Persona saved my life—that is no exaggeration. If I had not found the strength to make that film, I would probably have been all washed up. One significant point: for the first time I did not care in the least whether the result would be a commercial success". The filmmakers considered the titles Sonat för två kvinnor (Sonata for Two Women), Ett stycke kinematografi (A Piece of Cinematography), Opus 27, and Kinematografi, but Fant suggested something more accessible and the title was changed.

=== Casting ===
Bergman had planned to cast Andersson and Ullmann in The Cannibals, a large project he abandoned after becoming ill, but he still hoped to pair them in a project. Ullmann said that she began to be cast in Bergman's films beginning with the mute character, Elisabet: "It was because my face could say what he wanted to say. That made me the one he wanted to work with ... because it was my face and I also understood what he was writing". Steve Vineberg wrote that, with the conception of the project with Andersson and Ullmann, Bergman parted with his past uses of ensemble casts in films such as Smiles of a Summer Night and focused on two leads. Vineberg called the roles of Margaretha Krook and Gunnar Björnstrand "abbreviated guest appearances".

Bergman cast Jörgen Lindström as Elisabet's son after using him in his 1963 film The Silence. Lindström (born 1951) was a child actor, and played children in other films. Bergman was the uncredited narrator.

=== Filming ===
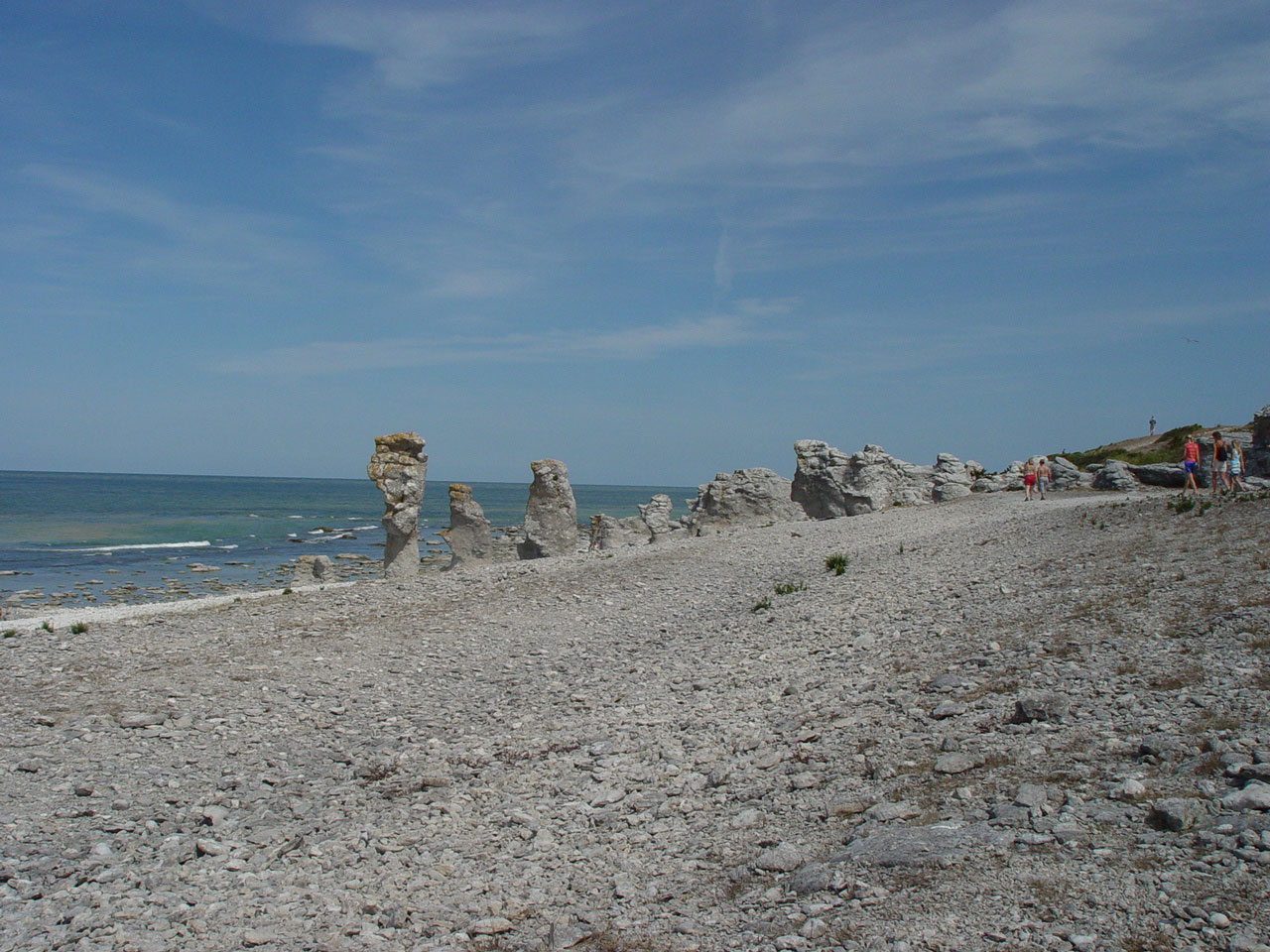
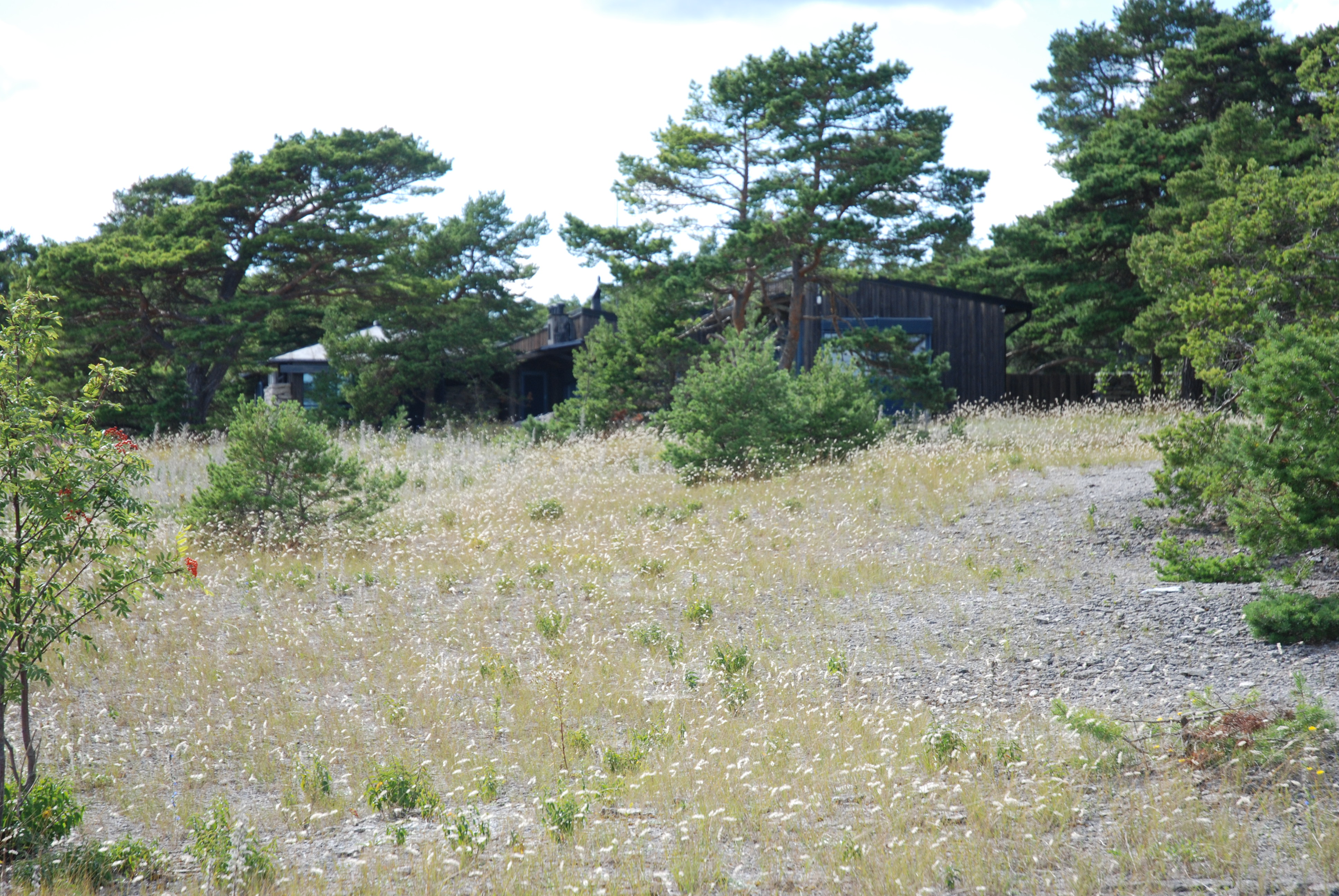
The film was shot on the island of Fårö, including Langhammars (above) and Bergman's property at Hammars.

Principal photography took place on the island of Fårö (including Langhammars, with its rauks in the background, and Bergman's property at Hammars) and at Råsunda Studios in Stockholm. Shooting began on 19 July 1965 and wrapped by 15 September. Ullmann described the initial Stockholm shoot as marred by awkward performances and unprepared direction; the crew opted to retreat to Fårö, where Bergman found a house to shoot in. Fårö's weather was ideal during shooting; the crew redid much of the footage filmed in Stockholm, recreating the summer house on the Stockholm set and using a Fårö museum as the hospital.

Andersson said that she and Ullmann agreed to play their parts as different sides of the same personality, and they assumed that personality was Bergman's. The actress said that they tried to balance each other in their performances. Bergman told his actresses not to ask him what each scene meant; Ullmann believed that cinematographer Sven Nykvist was also not informed of the director's intentions and left to work intuitively.

Although the scene where Alma describes her orgy was in the screenplay, Andersson said in 1977 that Bergman had been advised to remove it from the film. She insisted that it be shot, volunteering to alter dialogue she felt was too obviously written by a man. The scene took two hours to shoot, using close-ups of Ullmann and Andersson in single takes. Andersson later said that while she thought some of her performances in films such as Wild Strawberries were "corny", she was proud of her work in Persona. Ullmann described her response shots as an unprepared, natural reaction to the story's erotic nature.

For the scene in which Andersson and Ullmann meet in the bedroom at night and their faces overlap, a large amount of smoke was used in the studio to make a blurrier shot. Bergman used a mirror to compose the shots.

=== Post-production ===
The screenplay called for a "close-up of Alma with a strange resemblance to Elisabet". On Fårö, Bergman conceived a shot where Ullmann and Andersson's faces merge into one. This was done by lighting what Bergman considered the unflattering side of each actress's face in different shots and combining the lighted sides. The actresses were unaware of the effect until a screening in the Moviola. Neither actress recognized herself in the resulting imagery, each assuming that the shot was of the other. (Note: Bergman described the Moviola screening, with the actresses unaware of the effect: "We set the machine running, and Liv said, 'Oh look, what a horrible picture of Bibi!' And Bibi said, 'No, it's not me, it's you!' Then the picture stopped. Everyone's face has a better and a worse side, and the picture is a combination of Bibi's and Liv's less attractive sides. At first, they were so scared they didn't even recognize their own faces. What they should have said was: 'What the hell have you done with my face?' But they didn't! They didn't recognize their own faces. I find that rather an odd reaction". Author Paul Coates replied "Bergman's own reaction is itself odd", as a person will not "identify" with their least flattering angle, and each actress would accurately recognize the other in a shot with both faces.)

According to Ullmann, the scene where Alma describes Elisabet's motherhood was filmed with two cameras, one filming each actress, and shots of each were intended to be mixed in editing. Then Bergman decided that each angle communicated something important and used both in their entirety, one after the other.

Bergman was unhappy with the sound in the scene where Alma describes the orgy, so he told Andersson to reread the scene, which she did in a lower voice. It was recorded and dubbed in.

The score, by Lars Johan Werle, uses four cellos, three violins, and other instruments. Werle described his effort to meet Bergman's requests without a description of the scenes Werle would score:

Then he came with vague hints about how the films would look, but I understood him anyway and he gave me some keywords ... I was a little surprised to be part of an artistic work that I had so little time to digest ... One wonders how it is even possible that one could only see the movie once or twice and then compose the music.

In addition to Werle's score, the filmmakers used an excerpt from Johann Sebastian Bach's Violin Concerto in E major.

== Release ==
Persona was released on 31 August 1966, and its promotional premiere took place on 18 October 1966 at the Spegeln cinema in Stockholm. Its screenplay was published as a book in Sweden that year. The film's box-office losses qualified it for subsidies from the Swedish Film Institute. Combined with the institute's earlier production grant, the project received 1,020,000 kr from the SFI.

It opened in the U.S. on 6 March 1967, where it grossed $250,000. Distributed by United Artists, it debuted at the New York Film Festival with UA marketing highlighting the leads' similar appearance. The marketing quoted critics, particularly about Alma's erotic monologue. (Note: The marketing pictures the actresses as pieces of a jigsaw puzzle, with critics' quotes which read: "'There is a bizarre sexual encounter with two boys on a beach done with remarkable simplicity and dignity' (NYT), '[Bergman] has followed the Swedish freedom into the exploration of sex' (N.Y. Post), 'Bergman proves that a fully clothed woman telling of a sexual experience can make all the nudities and perversions that his compatriots have been splattering on the screen lately seem like nursery school sensualities' (World Journal Tribune)".) Persona finished its New York run after one month, which was considered disappointing. In Brazil, it was released as Quando Duas Mulheres Pecam (When Two Women Sin) to emphasize its sexuality. Persona was released in the United Kingdom in 1967, using subtitles when many foreign-language films were still dubbed.

Two scenes censored from the U.S. and U.K. versions of the film were a brief shot at the beginning of an erect penis and some of the translation of Alma's nighttime monologue about the orgy, oral sex and abortion. MGM archivist John Kirk restored the censored material, based on four translations, and translated 30 to 40 percent more of Alma's dialogue in the censored scene. Kirk's version was screened at the Film Forum in New York City and the Los Angeles County Museum of Art in 2001. Much of the censored material was included in Region 1 in the MGM DVD released in 2004, and on The Criterion Collection's 2014 Blu-ray 2K restoration.

The 1999 Toronto International Film Festival featured a screening of Persona as part of "Dialogues: Talking with Pictures", with classic films and a talk by Canadian filmmaker Patricia Rozema. In February 2002, it screened in the Retrospective section of the 52nd Berlin International Film Festival.

== Reception ==
=== Critical reception ===
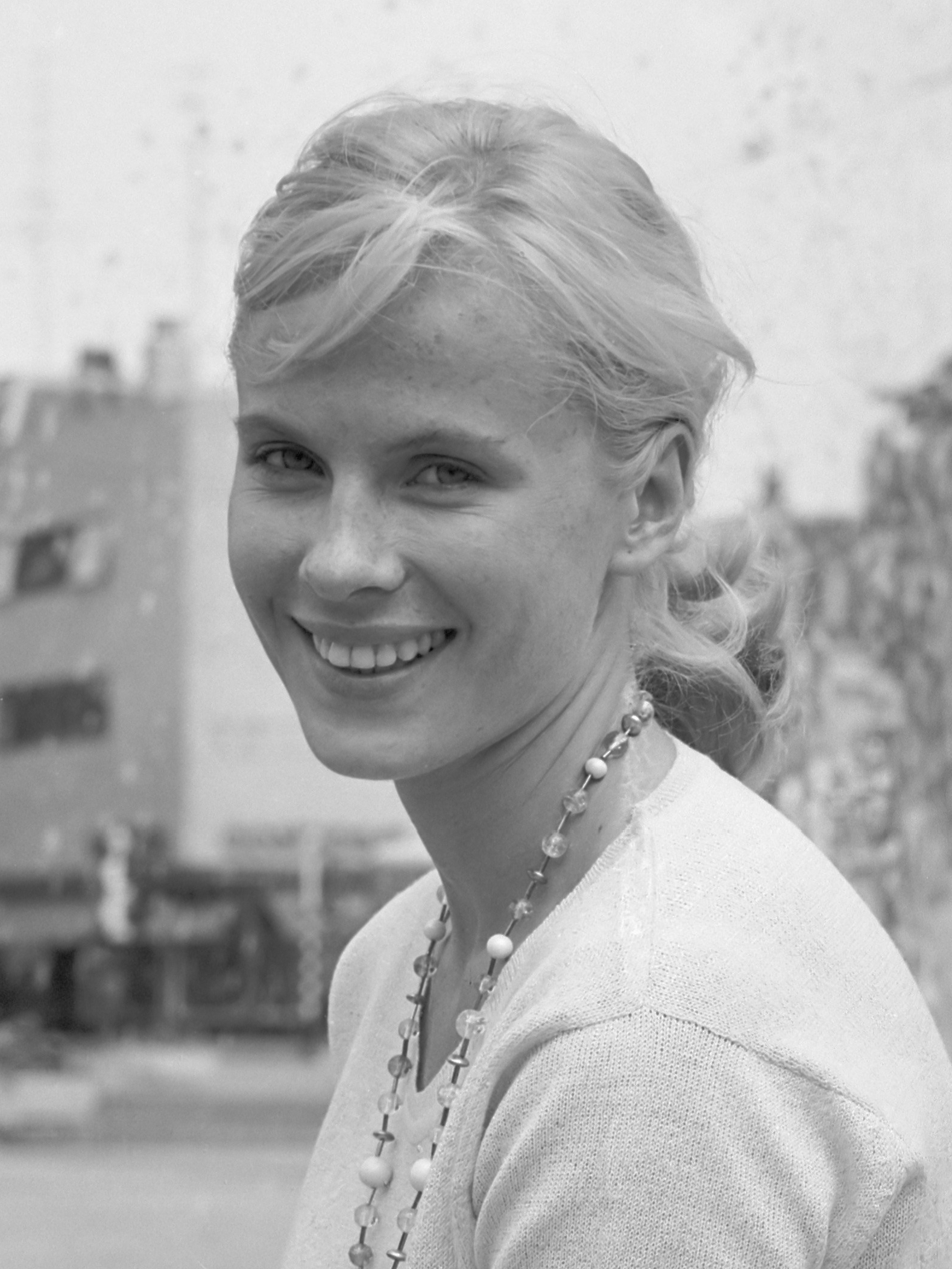
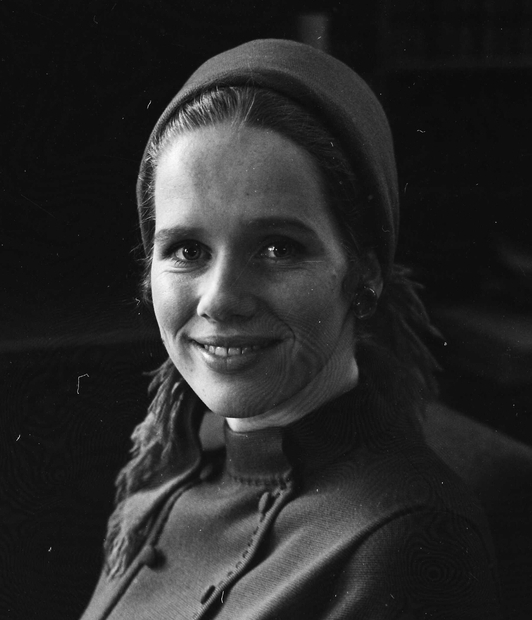
The performances of Bibi Andersson (L) and Liv Ullmann (R) were universally acclaimed and hailed. They are considered to be two of the best female performances of all time, among the best duo work in movie history, as well as the finest roles of their careers. Their performances had gained them many accolades and worldwide prestige.

The film was released to favorable reviews in the Swedish and U.S. press.

In Sweden, Dagens Nyheter critic Olof Lagercrantz said that a cult following of Swedish critics had developed by October 1966 and coined the name Person(a)kult for them. In Svenska Dagbladet, Stig Wikander called it "a gnostic quest for divine nothingness". In 1966, theologian Hans Nystedt compared the film to the writings of Hjalmar Sundén. The film ranked 1st on Cahiers du Cinéma's Top 10 Films of the Year List in 1967.

The Swedish Film Institute magazine Chaplin reported that the Person(a)kult had spread beyond Sweden by 1967. In one of his early reviews, Roger Ebert gave the film four stars; he called it "a difficult, frustrating film", and said that it (and Elisabet) "stubbornly refuse to be conventional and to respond as we expect". Bosley Crowther, writing for The New York Times, called Persona a "lovely, moody film which, for all its intense emotionalism, makes some tough intellectual demands". Crowther wrote that its "interpretation is tough", and "Miss Ullmann and Miss Andersson just about carry the film—and exquisitely, too". According to the Variety staff, "There is no denying the absorbing theme and the perfection in direction, acting, editing and lensing"; they called Andersson's performance a "tour de force", concluding: "Bergman has come up with probably one of his most masterful films technically and in conception, but also one of his most difficult ones". Time's review stated that the film "fuses two of Bergman's familiar obsessions: personal loneliness and the particular anguish of contemporary woman". In the 1972 British Film Institute Sight & Sound poll, Persona was ranked the fifth-greatest film of all time, the highest placing of a Swedish film. Persona was 41st in Sight & Sound's 2002 directors' ranking of the greatest films.

Essayists and critics have called Persona one of the 20th century's major artistic works, and Bergman's masterpiece. The Independent critic Geoffrey Macnab noted that a number of other critics considered it among the greatest films of all time. Empire's David Parkinson gave the film five stars in 2000, noting its variety of interpretations and attributing them to Bergman's distortion of the border between real life and fantasy and calling it a "devastating treatise on mortal and intellectual impotence". Ebert added it to his Great Movies list in 2001, calling it "a film we return to over the years, for the beauty of its images and because we hope to understand its mysteries". Peter Bradshaw gave it four of five stars in his 2003 The Guardian review, calling it "a startling, even gripping essay". For The Chicago Tribune, Michael Wilmington awarded it four stars in 2006 and praised it as "one of the screen's supreme works and perhaps Ingmar Bergman's finest film". In 2007, Aftonbladet called its prologue one of the more memorable moments of Bergman's filmography. The New Yorker's Pauline Kael said the end result was a "pity", but the scene where Alma describes her orgy is "one of the rare truly erotic sequences in movie history".

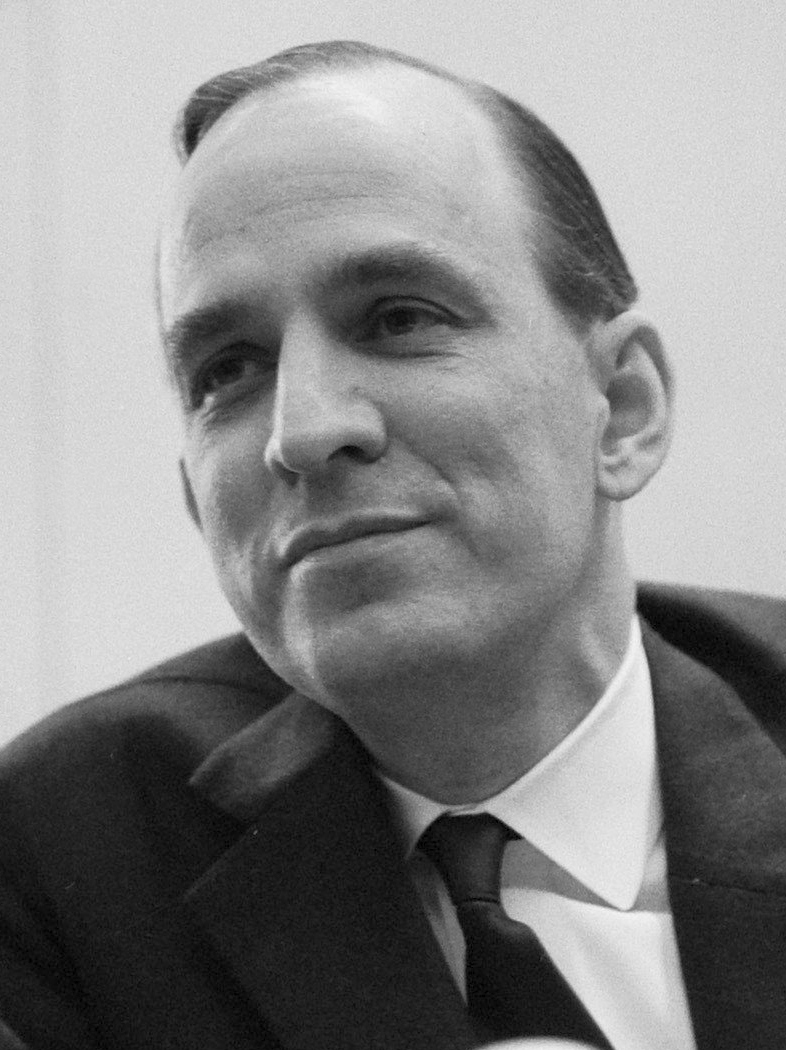
Several critics called Persona Ingmar Bergman's magnum opus, and he won the National Society of Film Critics Award for Best Director for the film.

Reviewing Persona's home video, Richard Brody credited Bergman for a work that shed realism with special effects and conveyed "a tactile visual intimacy", and praised the film's island setting. Leonard Maltin gave the film 3 1/2 stars in his 2013 Movie Guide, calling it "haunting, poetic, for discerning viewers". According to Time Out's review, Elisabet can (despite her fraud) be understood: "not an easy film, but an infinitely rewarding one". Chicago Reader critic Dave Kehr wrote that it might be Bergman's best, but objected to its unoriginal ideas (for an experimental film) and tediousness. Emanuel Levy reviewed Persona in 2016, calling it a complicated, mysterious and artistic psychological drama with experimentation presenting a novel result.

In 1996, Persona was included in Movieline Magazine's "100 Greatest Foreign Films". The Village Voice ranked the film 102nd on its Top 250 "Best Films of the Century" list in 1999, based on a poll of critics. Persona was included on Time magazine's "All-TIME" 100 best movies list and in The New York Times Guide to the Best 1,000 Movies Ever Made. In 2010, it ranked 71st in Empire magazine's "100 Best Films of World Cinema". In the 2012 Sight & Sound polls, it was ranked the 17th-greatest film ever made in the critics' poll (tied with Akira Kurosawa's Seven Samurai) and 13th in the directors' poll. In the 2022 edition of Sight & Sound's Greatest films of all time list the film ranked 18th in the critics' poll and 9th in the directors' poll. In 2012 the film ranked sixth on the 25 best Swedish films of all time in a poll of 50 film critics and academics by film magazine FLM. In 2017, The Daily Telegraph called Persona one of "the most pretentious movies of all time" and a "wholly subjective" exercise. On the review aggregator website Rotten Tomatoes, 91% of 57 critics' reviews are positive, with an average rating of 9.10/10. The website's consensus reads: "Arguably Bergman's finest film, Persona explores the human condition with intense curiosity, immense technical skill, and beguiling warmth." Metacritic, which uses a weighted average, assigned the film a score of 86 out of 100, based on 18 critics, indicating "universal acclaim". In 2018 the film ranked sixth on the BBC's list of the 100 greatest foreign-language films, as voted on by 209 critics from 43 countries. In 2021 the film ranked 23rd on Time Out magazine's list of The 100 best movies of all time.

=== Accolades ===
Persona won the Best Film award at the 4th Guldbagge Awards. It was Bergman's first work to win the National Society of Film Critics Award for Best Film; his 1973 Scenes from a Marriage was his only other film so honoured. Although it was the Swedish entry for the Best Foreign Language Film at the 39th Academy Awards, the film was not accepted by the academy. (Note: Journalist Michael Wilmington, observing the fact that Sweden submitted the film but the Academy of Motion Picture Arts and Sciences did not nominate it, criticized the Academy for preferring conventional cinema beginning in 1966 and continuing to the time of his writing in 1992. While Persona did not win the Academy Award, three other Bergman films did: The Virgin Spring (1960), Through a Glass Darkly, and Fanny and Alexander (1982).)

Award	Date of ceremony	Category	Recipient(s)	Result	Ref(s)
BAFTA Awards	28 March 1968	Best Foreign Actress	Bibi Andersson	Nominated	
Guldbagge Awards	9 October 1967	Best Film	Ingmar Bergman	Won	
Guldbagge Awards	9 October 1967	Best Actress	Bibi Andersson	Won	
National Board of Review	31 December 1967	Top Foreign Films	Ingmar Bergman	Won	
National Society of Film Critics	January 1968	Best Film	Ingmar Bergman	Won	
National Society of Film Critics	January 1968	Best Director	Ingmar Bergman	Won	
National Society of Film Critics	January 1968	Best Actress	Bibi Andersson	Won	
National Society of Film Critics	January 1968	Best Screenplay	Ingmar Bergman	2nd Place	
National Society of Film Critics	January 1968	Best Cinematography	Sven Nykvist	3rd Place	

== Legacy ==
Some of Bergman's later films, such as Shame (1968) and The Passion of Anna (1969), have similar themes of the "artist as fugitive", guilt and self-hatred. Robert Altman's 1972 psychological horror film Images is influenced by Persona. Altman's 1977 film 3 Women takes cues from Bergman as Shelley Duvall and Sissy Spacek's characters (Millie and Pinky) shift roles and identities. (Note: Ebert wrote: "Altman says Ingmar Bergman's Persona was one of his influences, and we can see that in the way Pinky does secret things to hurt Millie, spies on her secrets, and eventually tries to absorb and steal her identity. Persona has a central moment of violence in which the film seems to break and the story must begin again, and Pinky's dive into the pool works in the same way". Writer Frank Caso linked Altman's That Cold Day in the Park (1969) and Images and 3 Women, declaring them a trilogy, and identified 3 Women's themes as including obsession, schizophrenia and personality disorder.) A spoof of Persona appeared on the Canadian television program SCTV during the late 1970s. Woody Allen's films Love and Death (1975) and Stardust Memories (1980) contain brief references to the film. Jean-Luc Godard included a parody of Andersson's orgy monologue in his 1967 film Weekend, in a scene where Mireille Darc describes a threesome with a lover and his girlfriend involving eggs and a bowl of milk.

David Lynch's 2001 film Mulholland Drive deals with similar themes of identity and has two female characters whose identities appear to merge. With its thematic similarities, the film's "mysterious dreamlike quality" is evidence of Bergman's (and particularly Persona's) influence. David Fincher's Fight Club refers to Persona's subliminal erect penis. Parallels to "two (usually isolated) women in an intense relationship slowly blending and morphing into one another" may be seen in the competing ballerinas in Darren Aronofsky's Black Swan (2010) and the sisters in Lars von Trier's Melancholia (2011). In 2016, The Independent reported on a video essay about Persona's influence that compared shots in Don't Look Now (1973), Apocalypse Now (1979) and The Silence of the Lambs (1991); some shots predated Persona, and appear in Alfred Hitchcock's Vertigo (1958) and Psycho (1960).

After Bergman's death in 2007, his residence and the Persona filming location at Hammars on Fårö was assessed at 35 million kr and sold. A stage adaptation, Hugo Hansén's Persona, played in Stockholm in 2011 and starred Sofia Ledarp and Frida Westerdahl. Another adaptation, Deformerad Persona by Mattias Andersson and his sister, Ylva Andersson, addressed multiple sclerosis and premiered at the Royal Dramatic Theatre in 2016. Ullmann and director Stig Björkman collaborated on a 2009 documentary, Scener från ett konstnärskap, with recordings of Bergman during the production of Persona.

=== Stage adaptation ===
The European premiere of Persona as a play – combined with Sophocles' Electra – took place in 2009 at the Deutsches Theater Berlin, directed by Philipp Preuss. The cast included Margit Bendokat, Gabor Biedermann, Valery Tscheplanowa, and Almut Zilcher.

In January 2026, the Royal National Theatre in London announced Electra/Persona, a new play adapted and directed by Benedict Andrews combining Persona with Sophocles' Electra, to premiere at its Lyttelton Theatre in August of that year.

== See also ==
- List of submissions to the 39th Academy Awards for Best Foreign Language Film
- List of Swedish submissions for the Academy Award for Best Foreign Language Film
