= Fårö Church =

- Fårö kyrka(Swedish)
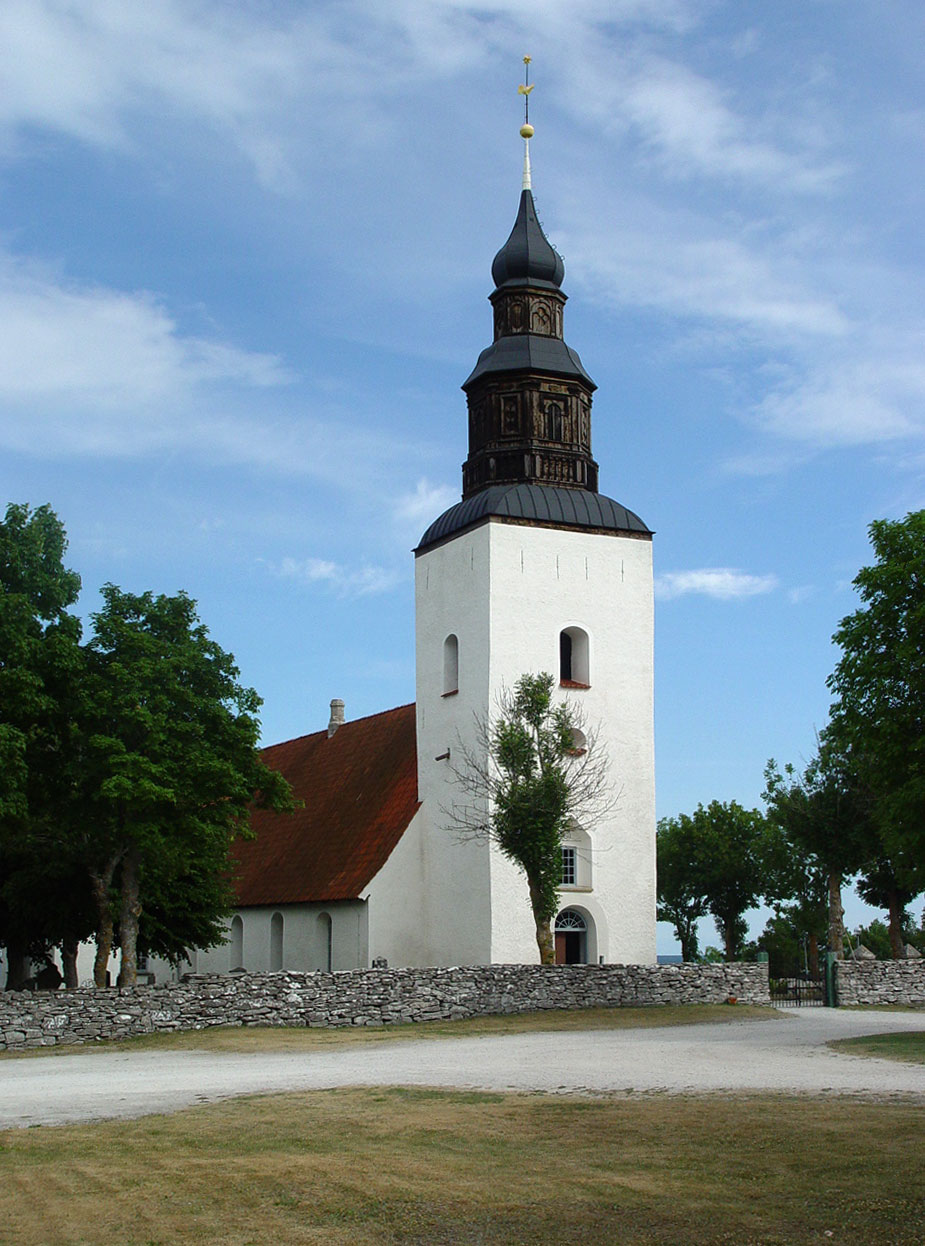
- Fårö Church, view of the exterior

- Location in Gotland province, Sweden
- 57°54′57″N 19°08′00″E
- Country: Sweden
- Denomination: Church of Sweden

Fårö Church (Swedish: Fårö kyrka) is the main church on Fårö island in Sweden, in the Diocese of Visby. Parts of the church were built in the 14th century, but much of the building dates from reconstructions in the 18th and 19th centuries.

Fårö Church dates from the Middle Ages and parts of it were built during the 14th century. A possible date for its inauguration is 1324, though it may have been earlier. Almost the entire nave and tower are medieval, but the church has lost much of its original look through subsequent reconstructions. The easternmost part of the church was torn down during the 18th century at the latest, and the tower was made taller and received the present spire in 1751. In 1761, windows were added in the northern wall. In 1858 the church attained its present cross-shaped form during another, even more thorough, reconstruction, during which the church entrance was moved from the southern façade to the tower. The church is the only medieval church on Gotland that has gone through such a radical reconstruction.

Two renovations have been carried out during the 20th century. The first, in 1967–68, included the introduction of electricity and electrical heating. The latest renovation was carried out in 2000–01.

The furnishings of the church also date from post-Reformation times with the exception of the baptismal font which was made in the 14th century. The pews and pulpit are from 1761, made by a local carpenter named Magnus Möller. The altarpiece, made of sandstone and adorned with a picture depicting the Last Supper, dates from the reign of Charles XI. The organ was originally made for Väddo Church in Uppland but brought to Fårö Church in 1875.

The most unusual items in the church are two paintings, dating from 1618 and 1767 respectively. They were both made in memory of seal-hunters who during winter had found themselves isolated on drifting ice sheets, unable to return to land but against all odds were eventually brought to safety again. The older of the two contains a depiction of the later ruined Visborg castle in Visby.

In the church cemetery is the grave of film-maker Ingmar Bergman and his wife Ingrid von Rosen. They were buried there together in 2007. Bergman had chosen the spot himself.

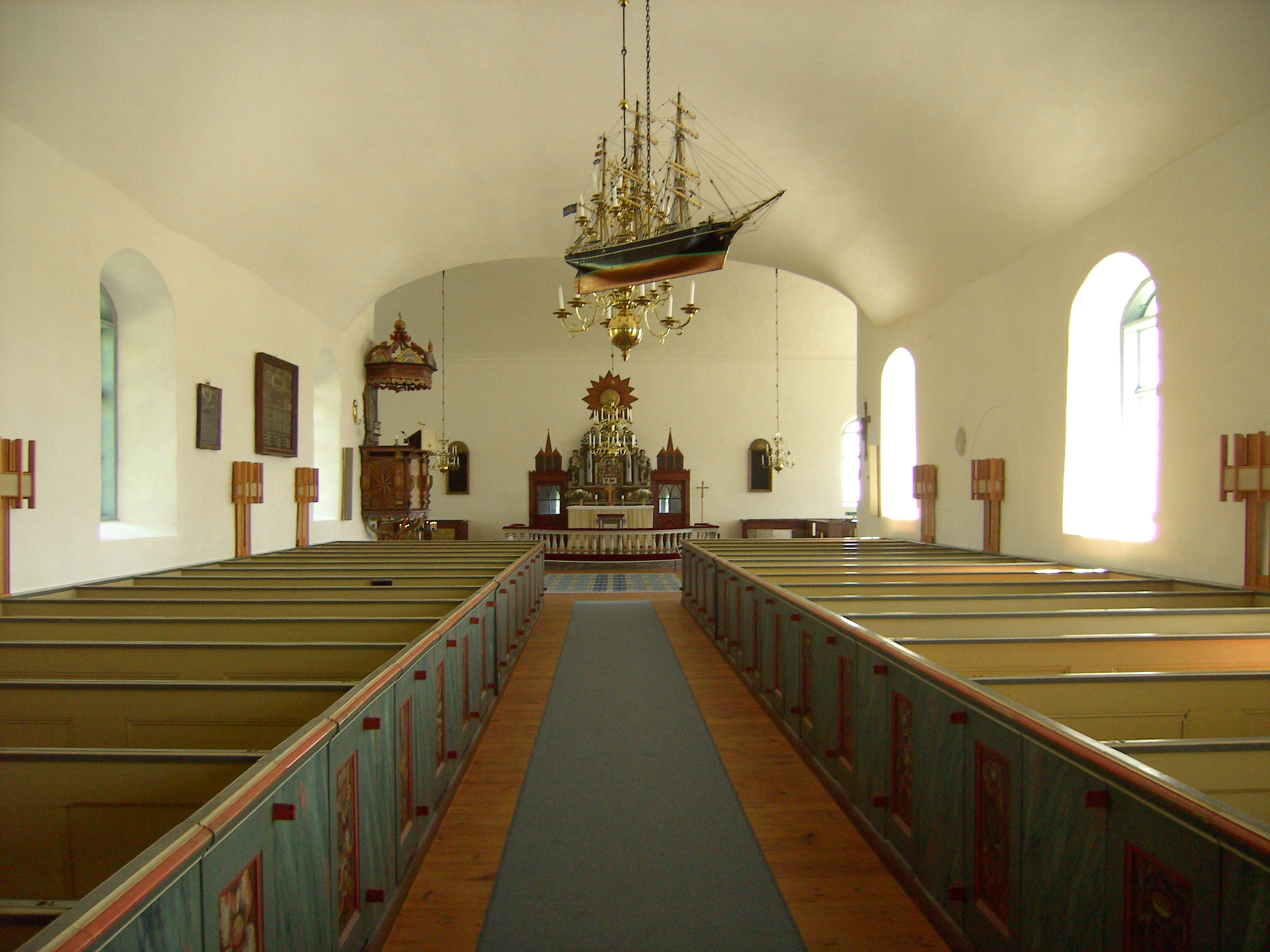
View of the interior towards the altar

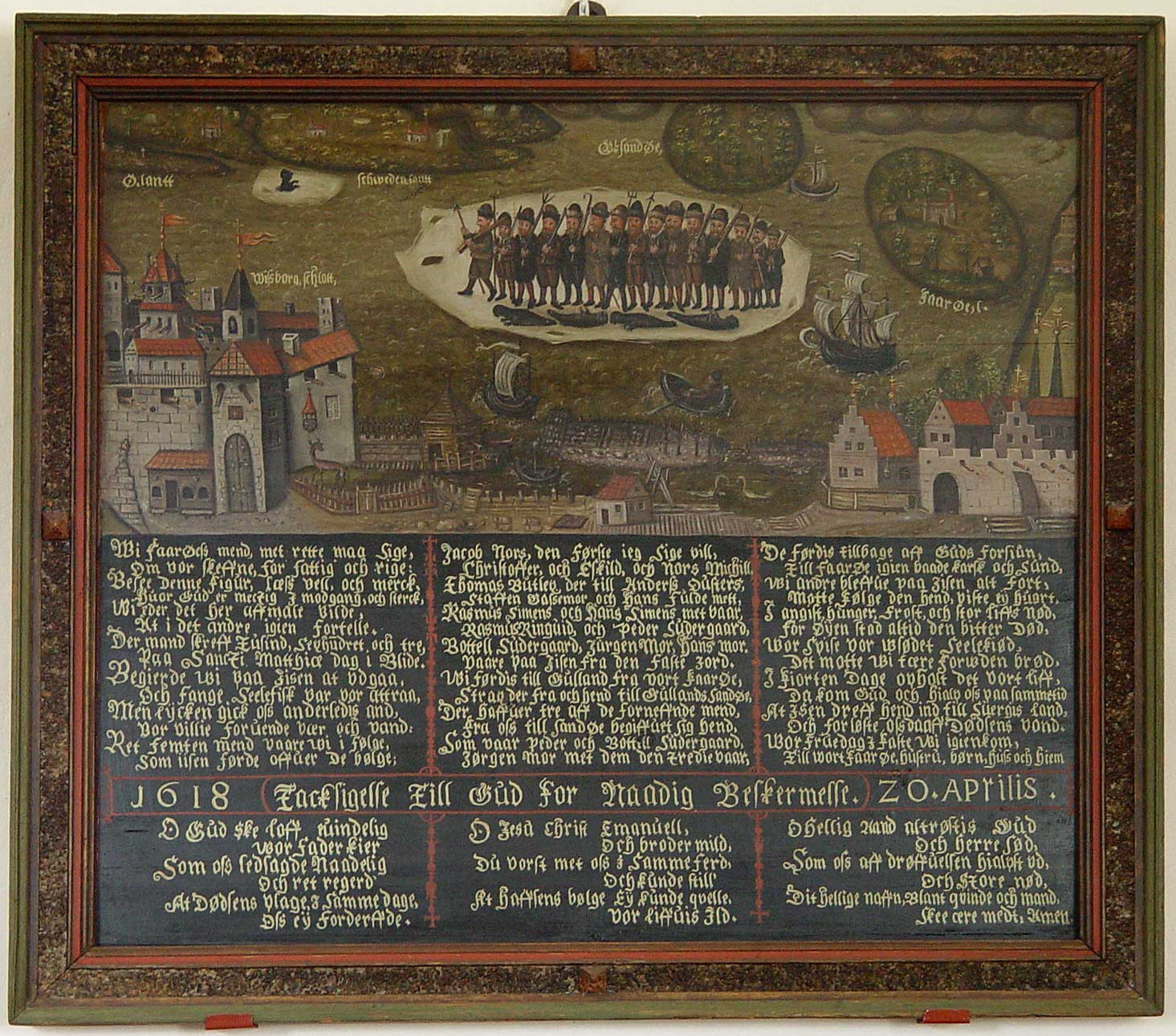
The 1618 painting depicting the rescue of the seal hunters

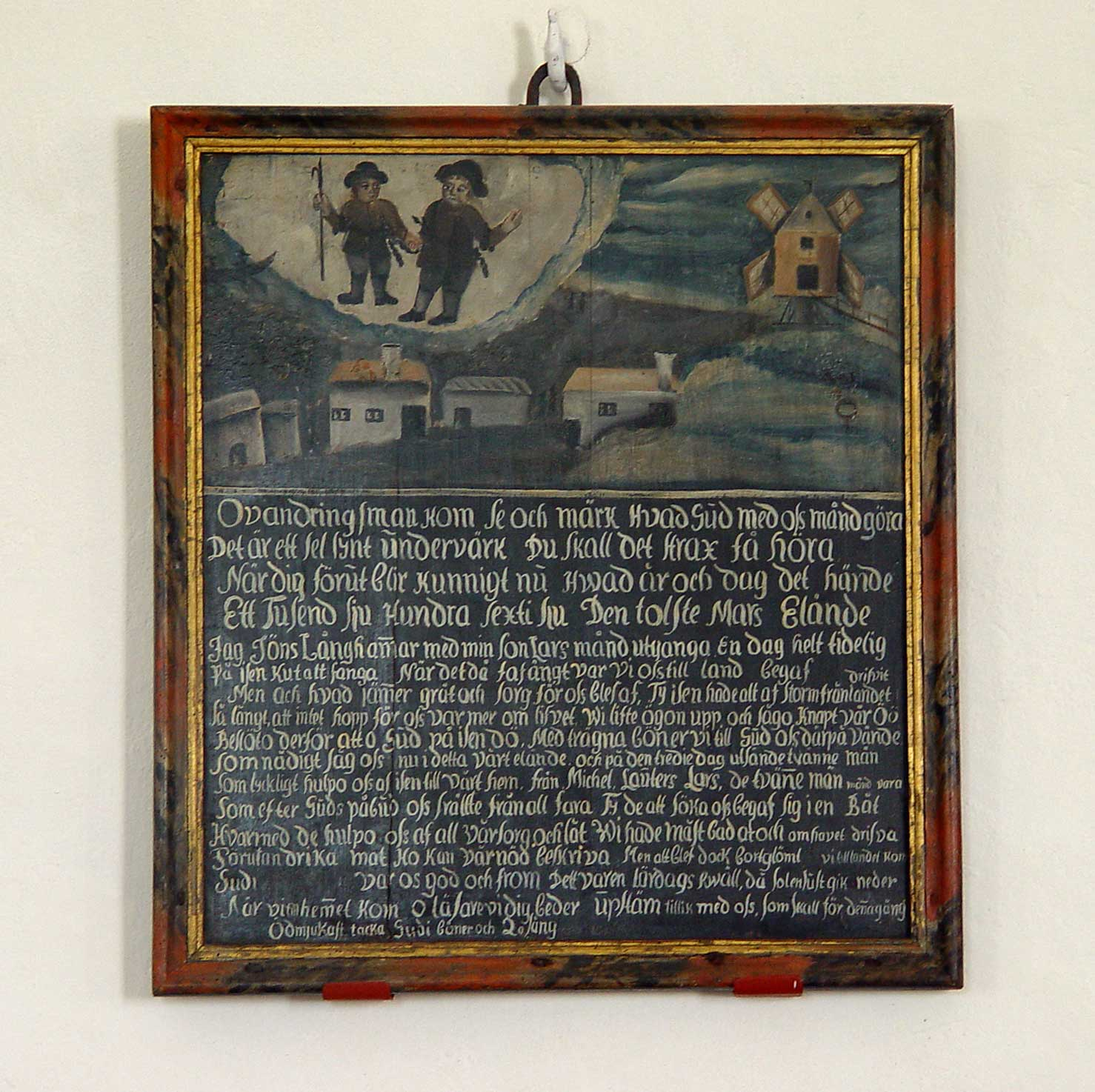
The 1767 painting depicting the rescue of the seal hunters

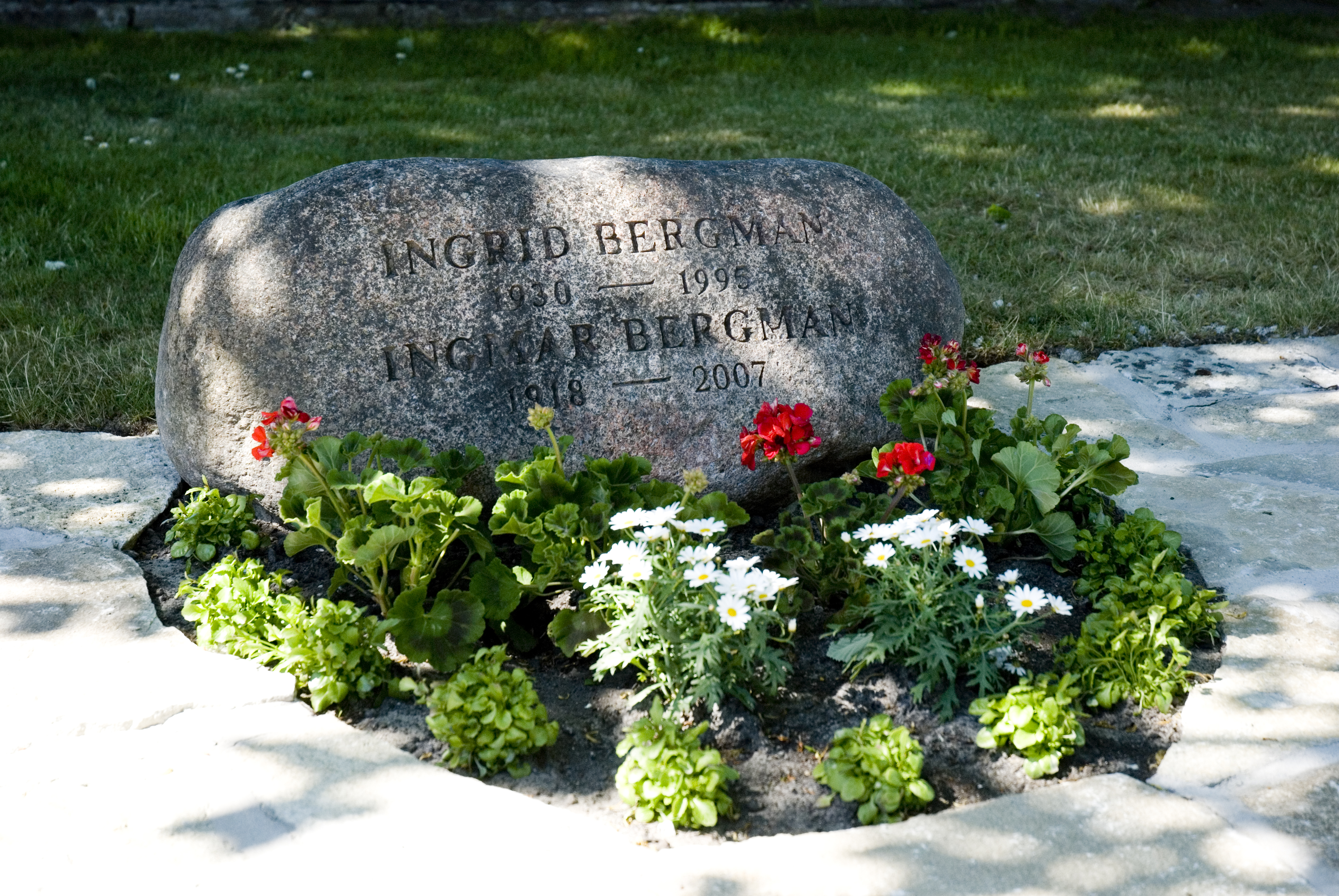
The grave of Ingmar Bergman and Ingrid von Rosen Bergman
