= Philip T. Hartung =

American film critic (1903–1973)

Philip T. Hartung (1903 – July 24, 1973) was an American writer.

He was the film critic for Commonweal from 1938 until his death in 1973 at the age of 70. He served as a consultant for the Office of Film and Broadcasting at the United States Catholic Conference. From 1942 to 1945, he also worked for the Museum of Modern Art. His work appeared in Esquire, Scholastic, Time, and Woman's Home Companion.

On July 24, 1973, Hartung died at St. Vincent's Hospital, in Manhattan, New York City, aged 70.
