= List of Swedish films of the 1960s =

This is a list of films produced in Sweden and in the Swedish language in the 1960s.

== 1960 ==
English Title	Director	Cast	Genre	Swedish Title	Notes
Åsa-Nisse as a Policeman	Ragnar Frisk	John Elfström, Artur Rolén, Brita Öberg	Comedy	Åsa-Nisse som polis	
The Devil's Eye	Ingmar Bergman	Jarl Kulle, Bibi Andersson, Stig Järrel, Nils Poppe	Comedy	Djävulens öga	
The Die Is Cast	Rolf Husberg	Åke Falck, Anita Björk, Sven Lindberg	Thriller	Tarningen ar kastad	
Good Friends and Faithful Neighbours	Torgny Anderberg	Edvin Adolphson, Anita Björk, George Fant	Drama	Goda vänner, trogna grannar	
Heart's Desire	Rolf Husberg	Jarl Kulle, Edvin Adolphson, Gösta Cederlund	Comedy	Av hjärtans lust	
The Judge	Alf Sjöberg	Ingrid Thulin, Gunnar Hellström, Per Myrberg	Drama	Domaren	Entered into the 1961 Cannes Film Festival
On a Bench in a Park	Hasse Ekman	Lena Granhagen, Sigge Fürst, Bengt Ekerot	Thriller	På en bänk i en park	
Summer and Sinners	Arne Mattsson	Karl-Arne Holmsten, Elsa Prawitz, Yvonne Lombard	Comedy	Sommar och syndare	
The Virgin Spring	Ingmar Bergman	Max von Sydow, Birgitta Valberg, Gunnel Lindblom, Birgitta Pettersson	Drama	Jungfrukällan	Won Academy Award for Best Foreign Language Film, 1960; entered into the 1960 Cannes Film Festival
The Wedding Day	Kenne Fant	Max von Sydow, Bibi Andersson, Edvin Adolphson	Comedy	Brollopsdagen	
When Darkness Falls	Arne Mattsson	Nils Asther, Karl-Arne Holmsten, Birgitta Pettersson	Thriller	När mörkret faller	

== 1961 ==
English Title	Director	Cast	Genre	Swedish Title	Notes
The Boy in the Tree	Arne Sucksdorff	Tomas Bolme, Anders Henrikson, Heinz Hopf	Drama	Pojken i trädet	
The Cat and the Canary	Jan Molander	Märta Dorff, Lena Granhagen, Inger Juel	Mystery	Katten och kanariefågeln	TV film
Love Mates	Lars-Magnus Lindgren	Jarl Kulle, Christina Schollin, Edvin Adolphson	Comedy	Änglar, finns dom?	
Lovely Is the Summer Night	Arne Mattsson	Karl-Arne Holmsten, Christina Carlwind, Per Oscarsson	Thriller	Ljuvlig är sommarnatten	
The Pleasure Garden	Alf Kjellin	Sickan Carlsson, Gunnar Björnstrand, Bibi Andersson	Comedy	Lustgården	
Rififi in Stockholm	Hasse Ekman	Gunnar Hellström, Tor Isedal, Nils Hallberg	Crime	Stöten	
Through a Glass Darkly	Ingmar Bergman	Harriet Andersson, Gunnar Björnstrand, Max von Sydow, Lars Passgård	Drama	Såsom i en spegel	Won Academy Award for Best Foreign Language Film, 1961
Two Living, One Dead	Anthony Asquith	Patrick McGoohan, Virginia McKenna, Bill Travers	Thriller	Två levande och en död	Co-production with UK

== 1962 ==
English Title	Director	Cast	Genre	Swedish Title	Notes
Adventures of Nils Holgersson	Kenne Fant	Max von Sydow, Jarl Kulle, Naima Wifstrand	Family	Nils Holgerssons underbara resa	Entered into the 3rd Moscow International Film Festival
The Lady in White	Arne Mattsson	Nils Asther, Anita Björk, Karl-Arne Holmsten	Mystery	Vita frun	
The Mistress	Vilgot Sjöman	Bibi Andersson, Birger Lensander, Per Myrberg	Drama	Älskarinnan	Entered into the 13th Berlin International Film Festival
Siska	Alf Kjellin	Harriet Andersson, Lars Ekborg, Mona Malm	Drama	Siska	
Ticket to Paradise	Arne Mattsson	Christina Schollin, Lars Ekborg, Eva Dahlbeck	Drama	Biljett till paradiset	
Winter Light	Ingmar Bergman	Gunnar Björnstrand, Ingrid Thulin, Max von Sydow, Allan Edwall	Drama	Nattvardsgästerna	

== 1963 ==
English Title	Director	Cast	Genre	Swedish Title	Notes
The Face of War	Tore Sjöberg	Bengt Ekerot, Bryant Haliday	Documentary, War	Krigets vanvett	Co-production with Japan
Hide and Seek	Lars-Magnus Lindgren	Jan Malmsjö, Catrin Westerlund, Sven Lindberg	Comedy	Kurragömma	
Raven's End	Bo Widerberg	Thommy Berggren, Keve Hjelm, Emy Storm	Drama	Kvarteret Korpen	Entered into the 1964 Cannes Film Festival
The Silence	Ingmar Bergman	Ingrid Thulin, Gunnel Lindblom, Birger Malmsten	Drama	Tystnaden	
A Sunday in September	Jörn Donner	Harriet Andersson, Thommy Berggren, Harry Ahlin	Drama	En söndag i September	
Sten Stensson Returns	Börje Larsson	Nils Poppe, Hjördis Petterson, John Norrman	Comedy	Sten Stensson kommer tillbaka	

== 1964 ==
English Title	Director	Cast	Genre	Swedish Title	Notes
491	Vilgot Sjöman	Lars Lind, Lars Hansson, Lena Nyman	Drama	491	
All These Women	Ingmar Bergman	Bibi Andersson, Harriet Andersson, Eva Dahlbeck	Comedy	För att inte tala om alla dessa kvinnor	First Bergman color film
Dear John	Lars-Magnus Lindgren	Jarl Kulle, Christina Schollin, Emy Storm	Drama	Käre John	
The Dress	Vilgot Sjöman	Gunn Wållgren, Gunnar Björnstrand, Tina Hedström	Drama	Klänningen	
Loving Couples	Mai Zetterling	Harriet Andersson, Gunnel Lindblom, Gio Petré	Drama	Älskande par	Entered into the 1965 Cannes Film Festival
My Love and I	Gunnar Höglund	Mathias Henrikson, Maude Adelson, Lars Lind	Thriller	Kungsleden	Entered into the 15th Berlin International Film Festival
Swedish Wedding Night	Åke Falck	Jarl Kulle, Christina Schollin, Edvin Adolphson	Drama	Bröllopsbesvär	

== 1965 ==
English Title	Director	Cast	Genre	Swedish Title	Notes
The Chasers	Yngve Gamlin	Halvar Björk, Lars Passgård, Leif Hedberg	Drama	Jakten	Won the Jury Grand Prix at Berlin
I, a Woman	Mac Ahlberg	Essy Persson, Preben Mahrt, Jørgen Reenberg	Drama	Jeg - en kvinde	Co-production with Denmark
Love 65	Bo Widerberg	Keve Hjelm, Evabritt Strandberg, Inger Taube	Drama	Kärlek 65	Entered into the 15th Berlin International Film Festival
Morianna	Arne Mattsson	Anders Henrikson, Eva Dahlbeck, Elsa Prawitz	Thriller	Morianerna	
My Home Is Copacabana	Arne Sucksdorff,	Allan Edwall, Dirce Migliaccio, Flávio Migliaccio	Drama	Mitt hem är Copacabana	Entered into the Cannes and Moscow film festivals
Nightmare	Arne Mattsson	Ulla Jacobsson, Gunnar Hellström, Sven Lindberg	Thriller	Nattmara	

== 1966 ==
English Title	Director	Cast	Genre	Swedish Title	Notes
Heja Roland!	Bo Widerberg	Thommy Berggren, Mona Malm, Ulf Palme	Comedy	Heja Roland!	
Here's Your Life	Jan Troell	Eddie Axberg, Allan Edwall, Max von Sydow	Drama	Här har du ditt liv	Entered into the 17th Berlin International Film Festival
Hunger	Henning Carlsen	Per Oscarsson, Gunnel Lindblom, Birgitte Federspiel	Drama	Svält	Co-production with Denmark
The Island	Alf Sjöberg	Per Myrberg, Bibi Andersson, Karin Kavli	Drama	Ön	Entered into the 1966 Cannes Film Festival
My Sister, My Love	Vilgot Sjöman	Bibi Andersson, Per Oscarsson, Tina Hedström	Historical	Syskonbädd 1782	
Night Games	Mai Zetterling	Ingrid Thulin, Keve Hjelm, Jörgen Lindström	Drama	Nattlek	
Persona	Ingmar Bergman	Bibi Andersson, Liv Ullmann, Margaretha Krook	Drama	Persona	
The Princess	Åke Falck	Grynet Molvig, Lars Passgård, Monica Nielsen	Drama	Prinsessan	Entered into the 5th Moscow International Film Festival
Woman of Darkness	Arne Mattsson	Gunnel Lindblom, Christina Schollin, Gösta Ekman	Crime	Yngsjömordet	

== 1967 ==
English Title	Director	Cast	Genre	Swedish Title	Notes
Elvira Madigan	Bo Widerberg	Pia Degermark, Thommy Berggren, Yvonne Ingdal	Historical	Elvira Madigan	About Elvira Madigan; entered into the 1967 Cannes Film Festival
Hagbard and Signe	Gabriel Axel	Oleg Vidov, Gitte Hænning, Eva Dahlbeck	Drama	Den röda kappan	Co-production with Denmark
Hugs and Kisses	Jonas Cornell	Agneta Ekmanner, Sven-Bertil Taube, Lena Granhagen	Comedy drama	Puss & kram	
I Am Curious (Yellow)	Vilgot Sjöman	Lena Nyman, Peter Lindgren, Börje Ahlstedt	Drama	Jag är nyfiken - gul	
Life's Just Great	Jan Halldoff	Inger Taube, Keve Hjelm, Bengt Ekerot	Drama	Livet är stenkul	Entered into the 17th Berlin International Film Festival
The Reluctant Sadist	Mac Ahlberg	Gabriel Axel, Buster Larsen, Elsa Prawitz	Comedy	Jag - en älskare	Co-production with Denmark
Stimulantia	Ingmar Bergman, Jörn Donner, Gustaf Molander, Vilgot Sjöman,	Harriet Andersson, Ingrid Bergman, Lena Granhagen	Anthology	Stimulantia	
The Vicious Circle	Arne Mattsson	Gunnel Lindblom, Erik Hell, Gio Petré	Drama	Den onda cirkeln	

== 1968 ==
English Title	Director	Cast	Genre	Swedish Title	Notes
Badarna	Yngve Gamlin	Ingrid Thulin, Halvar Björk, Gunilla Olsson	Drama	Badarna	
The Corridor	Jan Halldoff	Per Ragnar, Agneta Ekmanner, Åke Lindström	Drama	Korridoren	Entered into the 6th Moscow International Film Festival
Fanny Hill	Mac Ahlberg	Diana Kjær, Hans Ernback, Keve Hjelm	Drama	Fanny Hill	
The Girls	Mai Zetterling	Bibi Andersson, Harriet Andersson, Gunnel Lindblom	Drama	Flickorna	
Hour of the Wolf	Ingmar Bergman	Max von Sydow, Liv Ullmann, Gertrud Fridh	Drama	Vargtimmen	
I Am Curious (Blue)	Vilgot Sjöman	Lena Nyman, Peter Lindgren, Börje Ahlstedt	Drama	Jag är nyfiken - blå	
Shame	Ingmar Bergman	Max von Sydow, Liv Ullmann, Gunnar Björnstrand, Ulf Johansson	Drama, war	Skammen	
Who Saw Him Die?	Jan Troell	Per Oscarsson, Ann-Marie Gyllenspetz, Kerstin Tidelius	Drama	Ole dole doff	Won Golden Bear at the 18th Berlin International Film Festival

== 1969 ==
English Title	Director	Cast	Genre	Swedish Title	Notes
Adalen Riots	Bo Widerberg	Peter Schildt, Kerstin Tidelius, Roland Hedlund	Drama	Ådalen 31	Nominated for Academy Award for Best Foreign Language Film and won the Grand Jury Special Prize at the 1969 Cannes Film Festival
A Dream of Freedom	Jan Halldoff	Per Ragnar, Stig Törnblom	Crime	En dröm om frihet	
The Bookseller Gave Up Bathing	Jarl Kulle	Allan Edwall, Margaretha Krook, Jarl Kulle	Drama	Bokhandlaren som slutade bada	
Harry Munter	Kjell Grede	Georg Adelly, Gun Jönsson, Carl-Gustaf Lindstedt	Drama	Harry Munter	Entered into the 1970 Cannes Film Festival
Made in Sweden	Johan Bergenstråhle	Lena Granhagen, Per Myrberg, Max von Sydow	Drama	Made in Sweden	Won a Silver Bear at Berlin
The Passion of Anna	Ingmar Bergman	Max von Sydow, Liv Ullmann, Bibi Andersson, Erland Josephson	Drama	En Passion	
The Rite	Ingmar Bergman	Ingmar Bergman, Gunnar Björnstrand, Anders Ek	Drama	Riten	
The Shot	Claes Fellbom	Peter Schildt, Solveig Ternström, Halvar Björk	Thriller	Skottet	
