= The Pitfall (1989 film) =

- Directed by: Vilgot Sjöman
- Written by: Vilgot Sjöman
- Produced by: Janne Wallin
- Starring: Börje Ahlstedt; Maria Kulle
- Cinematography: Ralph M. Evers
- Edited by: Leif Kristiansson
- Music by: Sven-Erik Bäck
- Distributed by: Sandrew
- Release date: April 14, 1989
- Running time: 84 minutes
- Country: Sweden
- Language: Swedish

The Pitfall (Swedish: Fallgropen) is a 1989 Swedish drama film that was written as well as directed by Vilgot Sjöman. It was entered into the main competition at the 46th Venice International Film Festival.

== Cast ==
- Börje Ahlstedt - Larry Pedersen
- Maria Kulle - Pix
- Ewa Fröling - Maud
- Kajsa Reingardt - Elisabeth
- Duncan Green - Mattias
- Halvar Björk - Westin
- Emy Storm - Larry's Secretary
