= Hip Hip Hurrah! (film) =

1987 Scandinavian drama film

- Directed by: Kjell Grede
- Written by: Kjell Grede
- Produced by: Katinka Faragó
- Starring: Stellan Skarsgård
- Cinematography: Sten Holmberg
- Release dates: 4 September 1987 (Norway); 4 September 1987 (Sweden); 18 September 1987 (Denmark)
- Running time: 110 minutes
- Countries: Sweden; Denmark; Norway
- Languages: Swedish; Danish

Hip Hip Hurrah! (Swedish: Hip hip hurra!, Norwegian: Hipp hipp hurra!) is a 1987 Danish-Norwegian-Swedish drama film directed by Kjell Grede. The film is named after the painting with the same name. At the 23rd Guldbagge Awards Grede won the award for Best Director and Lene Brøndum won the award for Best Actress. The film was selected as the Swedish entry for the Best Foreign Language Film at the 60th Academy Awards, but was not accepted as a nominee.

== History ==
The film presents the general background of the Skagen Painters and everything that attracted them to gather in Skagen but it is P.S. Krøyer (Stellan Skarsgård) who is the centre of attraction. It shows how he inspires the other painters to create ever better paintings while his wife Marie is considered to be the most beautiful woman in Denmark. However, Krøyer realises that it is only a matter of time before the mental illness suffered by his mother finally affects him too. The film received several awards including the Grand Special Jury Prize and a Golden Osella for Best Cinematography at the Venice Film Festival.

When Kjell Grede was asked why he as a Swede wanted to make a film about Danish artists, he explained: "The first step, when I look back, was that I was fascinated by the thought of that remote peninsula jutting out into the sea and bathed in sunshine, and of the people gathering there. The next step comes when you consider that group of people because you realise their feelings are so important to all of us — friendship, love and beauty, all that is positive, all that is best. The third step is that when you look at them more closely, you realise that those three qualities are under threat. They are threatened with obliteration, just like the peninsula itself... Everything which means so much to us is constantly threatened by Destiny with a capital D, that same destiny we believe psychotherapists can help us overcome but which in fact tears them apart too. You can see it in the group of artists. Beauty in the paintings of the Skagen artists, it was not something intended just for the enjoyment of the upper classes. It had an important role, it was a call against a hard life, against poverty and sickness and children who died. Ours is a life of luxury when we compare our times with theirs. Beauty was something spiritual, a religious experience, a question of life and death."

== Cast ==
- Stellan Skarsgård – Peder Severin Krøyer
- Lene Brøndum – Lille
- Pia Vieth – Marie Krøyer
- Helge Jordal – Christian Krohg
- Morten Grunwald – Michael Ancher
- Ulla Henningsen – Anna Ancher

== See also ==
- List of submissions to the 60th Academy Awards for Best Foreign Language Film
- List of Swedish submissions for the Academy Award for Best Foreign Language Film
