= My Sister, My Love =

My Sister, My Love may refer to:

- My Sister, My Love (film), 1966 Swedish film
- My Sister, My Love (2007 film), 2007 Japanese film, adapted from Boku wa Imōto ni Koi o Suru
- My Sister, My Love (novel), 2008 novel by Joyce Carol Oates
