= Maria Kulle =

Swedish actress (born 1960)

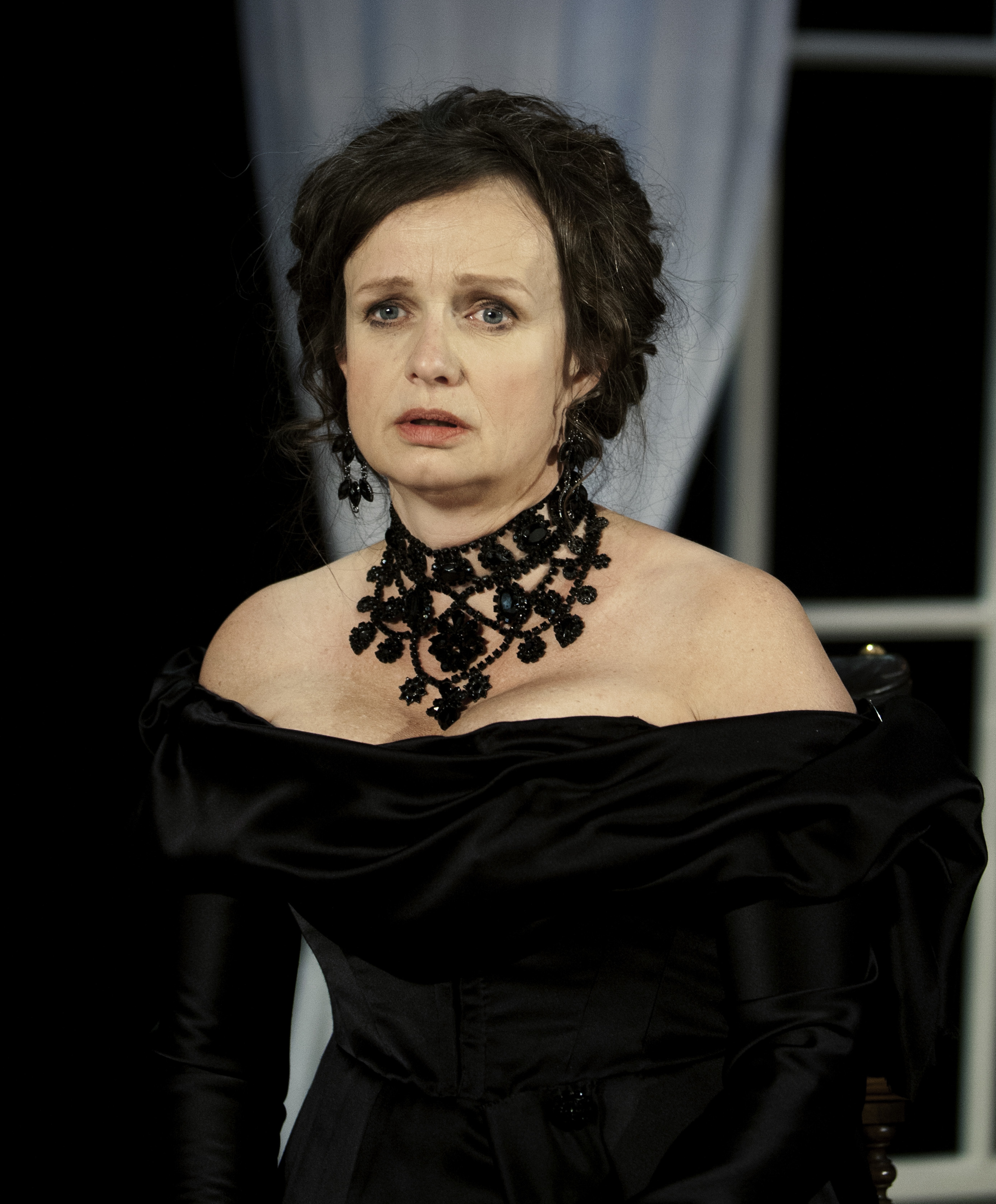
- Born: Hulda Maria Charlotte Kulle; 26 April 1960 (age 66); Svalöv, Sweden
- Education: Malmö Theatre Academy
- Occupation: Actress
- Years active: 1988–present
- Spouse: Lars-Erik Berenett
- Parent(s): Jarl Kulle; Louise Hermelin

Hulda Maria Charlotte Kulle (born 26 April 1960) is a Swedish actress. She is the daughter of the actor Jarl Kulle and Louise Hermelin.

Kulle began studying at the Malmö Theatre Academy in 1985 and graduated in 1988. Since then she works/has worked at Malmö, Stockholm and Helsingborg City Theatre. In 2005 she received a Guldbagge for her role as Anna in the 2004 film Four Shades of Brown. In 2011 she received Helsingborgs Dagblads kulturpris.

Kulle was married to Lars-Erik Berenett, with whom she has a son, until his death.

== Filmography ==
=== Film ===
- The Pitfall (1989)
- The Tattooed Widow (1998)
- Deadline (2001)
- Kim Novak badade aldrig i Genesarets sjö (2005)
- Allt om min buske (2007)
- Everlasting Moments (2008)
- Ted – För kärlekens skull (2018)

=== Television ===
- Wallander (2006)
- Gynekologen i Askim (2007–2011)
- Bibliotekstjuven (2011)
- Crimes of Passion (2013)
- Fröken Frimans krig (2013–17)
- The Bridge (2015–18)
