= Leif Liljeroth =

Swedish actor (1924–2018)

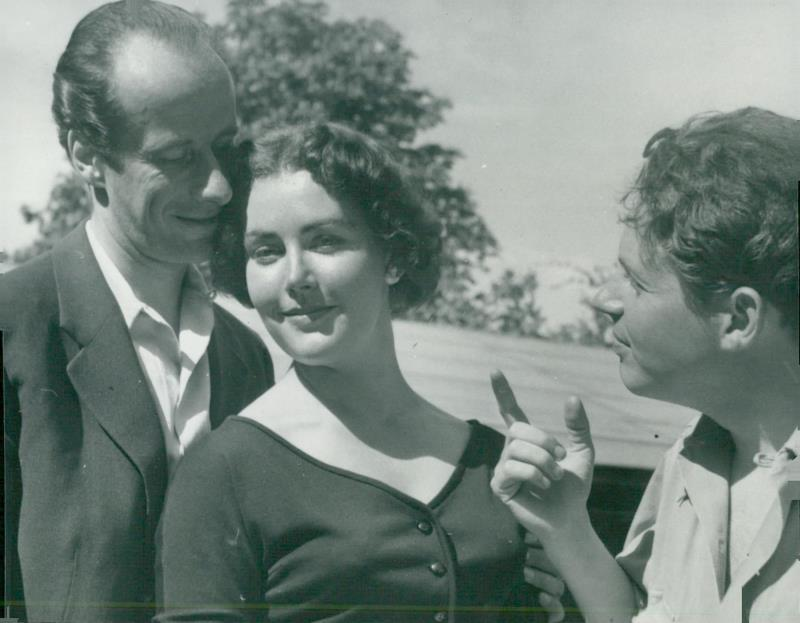
- Leif Liljeroth (left) with Ninja Lannerstedt and Tom Olsson in 1957
- Born: Leif Gustav Adolf Liljeroth; 18 October 1924; Stockholm, Sweden
- Died: 25 February 2018 (aged 93); Stockholm, Sweden
- Occupation: Actor
- Years active: 1961–2000

Leif Gustav Adolf Liljeroth (18 October 1924 – 25 February 2018) was a Swedish film actor. He made his film debut in Hasse Ekman's Rififi in Stockholm (1961).

== Filmography ==
=== Film ===
Year	Title	Role	Notes	Ref.
1961	Rififi in Stockholm	—N/a		
1964	491	Policeman		

=== Television ===
Year	Title	Role	Notes	Ref.
1964	Henrik IV	Earl of Westmoreland	Television movie	
