= Bibi Andersson =

Swedish actress (1935–2019)

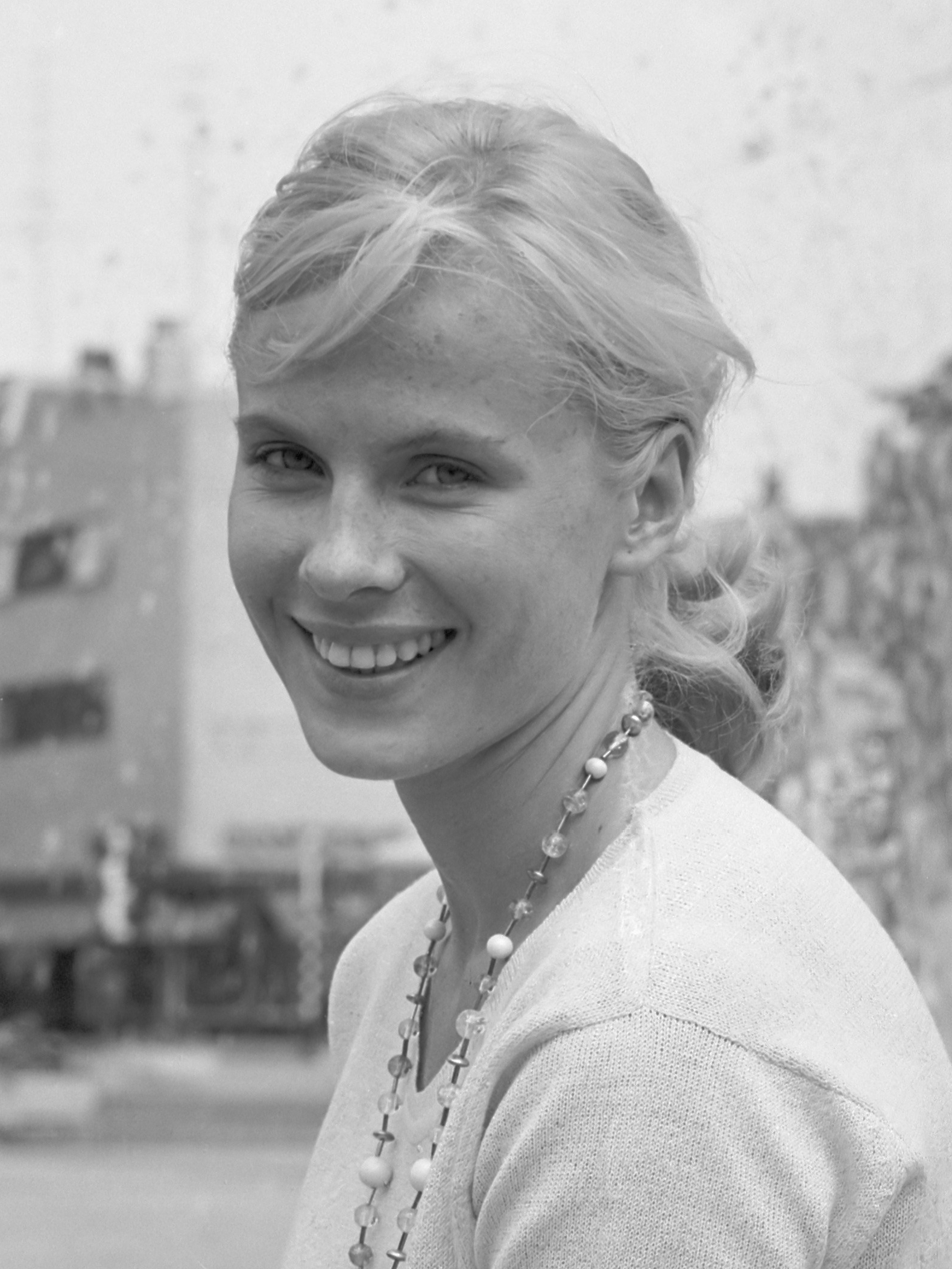
- Andersson in 1961
- Born: Berit Elisabet Andersson; 11 November 1935; Stockholm, Sweden
- Died: 14 April 2019 (aged 83); Stockholm, Sweden
- Education: Royal Dramatic Theatre School
- Occupation: Actress
- Years active: 1951–2009
- Spouses: Kjell Grede (m. 1960; div. 1973); Per Ahlmark (m. 1979; div. 1981); Gabriel Mora Baeza (m. 2004)
- Children: 1
- Relatives: Gerd Andersson (sister)

Berit Elisabet "Bibi" Andersson (Swedish: [ˈbɪ̂bːɪ ˈânːdɛˌʂɔn], 11 November 1935 – 14 April 2019) was a Swedish actress, best known for her frequent collaborations with filmmaker Ingmar Bergman. She received numerous accolades for her work, including four Guldbagge Awards (one for Best Actress and three for Best Supporting Actress), and Best Actress Awards from both the Cannes and Berlin film festivals. One of the greatest European Cinema actresses of all time, her performance in Avant-garde psychological thriller Persona is considered one of the best female acting performances in movie history as well as the finest role of her career.

== Early life and education ==
Andersson was born in Kungsholmen, Stockholm, the daughter of Karin (née Mansion), a social worker, and Josef Andersson, a businessman. She was the younger sister of Swedish film actress Gerd Andersson.

Her first collaboration with Ingmar Bergman came in 1951, when she participated in his production of an advertisement for the detergent Bris. She also worked as an extra on film sets as a teenager, and studied acting at the Terserus Drama School and at the Royal Dramatic Theatre School (1954–1956). She then joined the Royal Dramatic Theatre in Stockholm.

== Career ==
In the 1950s, 1960s, and 1970s, Andersson starred in 10 motion pictures and three television films directed by Bergman. With Ingrid Thulin, Eva Dahlbeck and Barbro Hiort af Ornäs, she shared the Best Actress Prize at the 1958 Cannes Film Festival for the director's Brink of Life, a film set in a maternity ward. The other films included The Seventh Seal, Wild Strawberries, The Magician, The Passion of Anna, The Touch, and Persona.

In 1963, Andersson won the Silver Bear for Best Actress at the 13th Berlin International Film Festival for her performance in Vilgot Sjöman's The Mistress.

=== From the mid-1960s onwards ===
Andersson's intense portrayal of a nurse in the film Persona (1966) – in which actress Elizabet Vogler (Liv Ullmann), suffering from a psychosomatic condition, is mostly mute – involved her delivering the majority of the dialogue. For her performance in Persona, she won the award for Best Actress at the 4th Guldbagge Awards. That year, she was seen alongside James Garner and Sidney Poitier in the Western Duel at Diablo. More Bergman collaborations followed, and she worked with John Huston (The Kremlin Letter, 1970) and Robert Altman (Quintet, 1979, with Paul Newman). She was actor Steve McQueen's co-star in his only film with credit as a producer, a stage adaptation by Arthur Miller of Henrik Ibsen's An Enemy of the People (1977).

Andersson made her debut in American theatre in 1973 with a production of Erich Maria Remarque's Full Circle. Her most famous American film is I Never Promised You a Rose Garden (1977), which also starred Kathleen Quinlan.

In 1990, Andersson worked as a theatre director in Stockholm, directing several plays at Dramaten. In the late 1980s and early 1990s, she worked primarily in television and as a theatre actress, working with Bergman and others. She was also a supervisor for the Road to Sarajevo, a humanitarian project.

== Honours ==
- 2006: Ibsen Centennial Commemoration Award

== Personal life ==
In 1996, Andersson published her autobiography, Ett ögonblick (A Moment, or, literally, A Blink of the Eye). She was married first to the director Kjell Grede (1960, divorced) with whom she had a daughter; and secondly to politician and writer Per Ahlmark (1979, divorced). Andersson then married Gabriel Mora Baeza on 29 May 2004. In 2009, she had a stroke; an article published the following year says that from that time on she had been hospitalized and was unable to speak.

=== Death ===
Andersson died on 14 April 2019, aged 83 from complications of a stroke.

== Legacy ==
73767 Bibiandersson, a minor planet discovered by Eric Walter Elst, is named after her.

== Selected filmography ==
Andersson appeared in the following films:

- Miss Julie (1951) as Dancing girl (uncredited)
- U-Boat 39 (1952) as Girl on the train (uncredited)
- The Beat of Wings in the Night (1953) as Student at Tornelius' party (uncredited)
- Stupid Bom (1953) as Elvira
- Sir Arne's Treasure (1954) as Berghild
- A Night at Glimmingehus (1954) as Maj Månsson
- The Girl in the Rain (1955) as Lilly
- Smiles of a Summer Night (1955)
- Egen ingång (1956) as Karin Johansson
- Last Pair Out (1956) as Kerstin
- The Seventh Seal (1957) as Mia / Mary - Jof's wife
- Mr. Sleeman Is Coming (1957, TV Movie) as Anne-Marie
- Summer Place Wanted (1957) as Mona Dahlström
- Wild Strawberries (1957) as Sara / Hitchhiker
- You Are My Adventure (1958) as Christina Blom
- Brink of Life (1958) as Hjördis Petterson
- Rabies (1958, TV Movie) as Eivor
- The Magician (1958) as Sara Lindqvist
- The Beloved Game (1959) as Lena
- The Wedding Day (1960) as Sylvia Blom
- The Devil's Eye (1960) as Britt-Marie
- Karneval (1961) as Monika
- Square of Violence (1961) as Maria
- The Pleasure Garden (1961) as Anna, Fanny's Daughter
- The Mistress (1962) as The Girl
- Pan (1962) as Edvarda
- All These Women (1964) as Humlan
- Juninatt (1965) as Britt
- Ön (1966) as Marianne
- About Love (1966) as Woman at the aerodrome
- My Sister, My Love (1966) as Charlotte / Sister
- Duel at Diablo (1966) as Ellen Grange
- Persona (1966) as Alma
- Pardon, Are You for or Against? (1966) as Ingrid
- Le viol (1967) as Marianne Séverin
- The Girls (1968) as Liz Lindstrand
- Black Palm Trees (1968) as Elin Pappila
- Tænk på et tal (1969) as Jane Merrild / Alice Badram
- Blow Hot, Blow Cold (1969) as Margit Lindmark
- The Passion of Anna (1969) as Eva Vergérus / Self
- The Kremlin Letter (1970) as Erika Kosnov
- Story of a Woman (1970) as Karin Ullman
- The Touch (1971) as Karin Vergerus
- Chelovek s drugoy storony (1972) as Britt Stagnelius
- The Man from the Other Side (1972)
- Afskedens time (1973) as Elsa Jacobsen
- Scenes from a Marriage (1974) as Katarina
- La Rivale (1974) as Blanche Huysman
- It's Raining on Santiago (1975) as Monique Calvé
- Blondie (1976) as Patricia Tauling
- I Never Promised You a Rose Garden (1977) as Dr. Fried
- An Enemy of the People (1978) as Catherine Stockmann
- L'Amour en question (1978) as Catherine Dumais
- Quintet (1979) as Ambrosia
- Twice a Woman (1979) as Laura
- The Concorde... Airport '79 (1979) as Francine
- Barnförbjudet (1979) as The Mother
- Marmalade Revolution (1980) as Anna-Berit
- Jag rodnar (1981) as Siv Andersson
- Exposed (1983) as Margaret
- Svarta fåglar (1983) as Simone Cambral
- A Hill on the Dark Side of the Moon (1983) as Ann-Charlotte Leffler
- Sista leken (1984) as Viktor's Wife
- Wallenberg: A Hero's Story (1985, TV Movie) as Maria 'Maj' Wallenberg
- Huomenna (1986) as Singer
- Poor Butterfly (1986) as Gertrud
- Los dueños del silencio (1987) as Marie-Louise Wallén, Ambassador
- Babette's Feast (1987) as Swedish Lady-in-Waiting
- Creditors (1988) as Tekla
- Una estación de paso (1992) as Lise
- The Butterfly's Dream (1994) as La madre
- Dreamplay (1994) as Victoria
- Det blir aldrig som man tänkt sig (2000) as Solveig Olsson
- Anna (2000) as Annas Mor
- Elina: As If I Wasn't There (2002) as Tora Holm
- The Lost Prince (2003, TV Movie) as Queen Alexandra
- När mörkret faller (2006) as Svärmodern
- Arn – The Knight Templar (2007) as Moder Rikissa
- Arn – The Kingdom at Road's End (2008) as Moder Rikissa
- The Frost (2009) as The Widow Rat
