= Rabies (1958 film) =

1958 film

- Written by: Olle Hedberg
- Directed by: Ingmar Bergman
- Starring: Bibi Andersson
- Country of origin: Sweden
- Original language: Swedish

Production
- Producer: Henrik Dyfverman
- Running time: 89 minutes

Original release
- Release: 7 November 1958

Rabies is a 1958 Swedish television drama film directed by Ingmar Bergman.

The film depicts domino frustrations of how those who are rejected or oppressed take it out on someone else.

== Cast ==
- Bibi Andersson as Eivor
- Axel Düberg as Cpl. Sven
- Åke Fridell as Sixten Garberg
- Tor Isedal as Knut
- Åke Jörnfalk as Rolf
- Gunnel Lindblom as Jenny
- Dagny Lind as Aunt
- Nils Nygren as Cronswärd
- Toivo Pawlo as Wholesaler
- Marianne Stjernqvist as Mrs. Svensson
- Folke Sundquist as Erik
- Max von Sydow as Bo Stensson Svenningson
