= Göran Forsmark =

Swedish actor (1955–2020)

Rolf Göran Forsmark
- Born: Rolf Göran Forsmark; 4 February 1955; Malmberget, Sweden
- Died: 9 August 2020 (aged 65)
- Occupation: Actor
- Years active: 1979–2021

Rolf Göran Forsmark (4 February 1955 – 9 August 2020) was a Swedish actor.

Forsmark was born in Malmberget. He studied at NAMA in Malmö between 1976 and 1979 and went on to work in film and theatre.

The actor died on 9 August 2020, at the age of 65.

== Selected filmography ==
=== Film ===
List of film appearances, with year, title, and role shown
Year	Title	Role	Notes
1995	30:e november	Adam's father	
1996	The Hunters	Håkan	
1997	Sanning eller konsekvens	The man	
1997	Beneath the Surface	pimp with Sandra	
1998	The Tattooed Widow	Joakim Hershagen	
1998	Lithivm	Werner	
2000	Once in a Lifetime	journalist	
2001	Blå måndag	brother	
2004	Popular Music	Birger	
2006	Exit		
2007	Solstorm	Sven Erik Stålnacke	
2008	Instead of Abracadabra	stunt – Roger	Short

=== Television ===
List of television appearances, with year, title, and role shown
Year	Title	Role	Notes
1997	Hammarkullen	Svante the poodle man	miniseries – 4 episodes
1997–2000	Skärgårdsdoktorn	Thomas Terselius	7 episodes
1998	The Tattooed Widow	Joakim Hershagen	TV movie
1998	Beck – Öga för öga	Mogren	TV movie
2001	Anderssons älskarinna	Bengt	4 episodes
2006	Möbelhandlarens dotter	Pastor Vedin	4 episodes
2011	Tjuvarnas jul	Jansson	13 episodes
2014	Thicker Than Water	Hannes	4 episodes
2016	Midnattssol	Sparen	6 episodes
2017	Rebecka Martinsson	Hjörleifur Arnarson	3 episodes
2018–19	Bonus Family	Björn	3 episodes
2019–21	Leif & Billy	Bullen	7 episodes
