= The Boy in the Tree =

1961 film

- Directed by: Arne Sucksdorff
- Written by: Arne Sucksdorff
- Produced by: Rune Waldekranz
- Starring: Tomas Bolme; Anders Henrikson; Heinz Hopf; Björn Gustafson
- Cinematography: Gunnar Fischer
- Edited by: Arne Sucksdorff; Eric Nordemar
- Music by: Quincy Jones
- Release date: 25 September 1961
- Running time: 86 minutes
- Country: Sweden
- Language: Swedish

The Boy in the Tree (Swedish: Pojken i trädet) is a 1961 Swedish drama film written and directed by Arne Sucksdorff, starring Tomas Bolme, Anders Henrikson, Heinz Hopf and Björn Gustafson. It tells the story of a troubled 16-year-old boy who seeks liberation in nature and teams up with two poachers.

== Cast ==
- Tomas Bolme as Göte
- Heinz Hopf as Max
- Björn Gustafson as Manne
- Anders Henrikson as John Cervin
- Birgitta Pettersson as Marie, Göte's sister
- Åke Lindman as Sten Sundberg, hunter
- Barbro Hiort af Ornäs as Göte's and Marie's mother
- Björn Berglund as Johannes, Göte's and Marie's father
- Karin Juel as Cervin's maid

== Release ==
The film was released in Swedish cinemas on 25 September 1961.
