= The Blessed Ones =

1986 television film directed by Ingmar Bergman

- Based on: De två saliga by Ulla Isaksson
- Screenplay by: Ulla Isaksson
- Directed by: Ingmar Bergman
- Starring: Harriet Andersson; Per Myrberg
- Country of origin: Sweden
- Original language: Swedish

Production
- Producers: Pia Ehrnvall; Katinka Faragó
- Cinematography: Per Norén
- Editor: Sylvia Ingemarsson
- Running time: 81 minutes

Original release
- Network: Sveriges Television
- Release: 19 February 1986

The Blessed Ones (Swedish: De två saliga) is a 1986 Swedish drama film directed by Ingmar Bergman, starring Harriet Andersson and Per Myrberg. The screenplay was adapted by Ulla Isaksson from her own novel with the same title. The film tells the story of a couple in which the woman becomes delusional and loses her mind. It was the third time Bergman directed a film written by Isaksson, after Brink of Life and The Virgin Spring. The Blessed Ones was produced by Sveriges Television and premiered on TV2 on 19 February 1986. The American premiere was on 21 February 1987 at the Museum of Broadcasting in New York City.

== Plot ==
Sune, a theology student who has dropped out and is also the son of a priest, meets Viveka in a church. The two connect via a theological discussion and eventually get married. As the years pass, Viveka grows more and more emotionally unstable due to jealousy and religious anxiety. Sune accepts Viveka's mental problems and, instead of seeking help for his wife, obeys her increasingly bizarre commands. Eventually Viveka loses her mind completely, locks herself in the couple's apartment while Sune is away, and tries to make neighbours and the police believe that Sune is trying to murder her with a knife. When Sune arrives home Viveka is taken away to a hospital. Sune tries to convince the doctors that Viveka is not insane and should be allowed to leave. In the end, Sune turns on a gas tap and lies down next to Viveka so they will die together.

== Cast ==
- Harriet Andersson as Viveka Burman
- Per Myrberg as Sune Burman
- Christina Schollin as Annika
- Lasse Pöysti as doctor Dettow
- Irma Christenson as Mrs. Storm
- Björn Gustafson as a neighbour
