= Lene Brøndum =

Danish actress (born 1947)

- Born: 26 June 1947 (age 79); Denmark
- Occupation: Actress
- Years active: 1976-present

Lene Brøndum (born 26 June 1947) is a Danish actress. At the 23rd Guldbagge Awards she won the award for Best Actress for her role in Hip Hip Hurrah! She has appeared in more than 35 films and television shows since 1976.

== Selected filmography ==
- The Olsen Gang Sees Red (1976)
- Winterborn (1978)
- Hip Hip Hurrah! (1987)
