= Helena Brodin =

Swedish actress (born 1936)

- Brodin in 1961
- Born: 11 June 1936 (age 89); Stockholm, Sweden
- Occupation: Actress
- Years active: 1960–2000
- Spouse: Gösta Friberg (m. 1964; died 2018)
- Children: 3

Helena Brodin (born 11 June 1936) is a Swedish actress. She appeared in more than 40 films and television shows between 1960 and 2000.

She was born on 11 June 1936. She studied at Royal Dramatic Training Academy from 1957–1960.

She co-starred with Lars Ekborg in the 1960 comedy film Tre önskningar. It received positive reviews from critics upon its release. In 2019, Aftonbladet wrote that the "light-hearted and quite charming comedy, with a serious undertone" had "aged quite well."

From 1978–1982 she played Signe Svensson, the wife of an alcoholic, in Hedebyborna.

In 1981, she and Sven Wollter appeared in Kallocain, a filmed play adaptation of Karin Boye's 1940 dystopian novel of the same name.

She had a main role in Skärgårdsdoktorn from 1997–2000, as the strict Nurse Berit Rapp.

She was married to Gösta Friberg, a writer and poet, until his death in 2018. They had three children together.

== Selected filmography ==
- Hugo and Josephine (1967)
- I Am Maria (1979)
- Der Mann, der sich in Luft auflöste (1980)
- Peter-No-Tail (1981)
- Spring of Joy (1993)
