= Hugo and Josephine =

- Directed by: Kjell Grede
- Written by: Kjell Grede
- Based on: Josephine, Hugo and Josephine and Hugo by Maria Gripe
- Produced by: Göran Lindgren
- Starring: Fredrik Becklén; Marie Öhman; Beppe Wolgers
- Music by: Torbjörn Iwan Lundquist
- Production companies: Sandrew Film & Teater AB
- Distributed by: Warner Bros.-Seven Arts (United States)
- Release date: 16 December 1967 (Sweden)
- Running time: 82 minutes
- Country: Sweden
- Language: Swedish

Hugo and Josephine (Swedish: Hugo och Josefin) is a Swedish film which was released to cinemas in Sweden on 16 December 1967, written and directed by Kjell Grede. The film is loosely based on three novels by Maria Gripe, and it stars Fredrik Becklén and Marie Öhman in the lead roles, with Beppe Wolgers, Helena Brodin and Inga Landgré in supporting roles. The film won the Guldbagge Award for Best Film at the 5th Guldbagge Awards.

== Production ==
The film was mostly shot in Kårsta between June–September 1967. The music is by Torbjörn Lundquist.

== Plot ==
The film is about a girl named Josephine (Marie Öhman), who is the daughter of a priest and lives in the country. She has no friends, but one day she meets Hugo (Fredrik Becklén), who is the nephew of the gardener Gudmarson. Along with him and Gudmarson (Beppe Wolgers), she experiences a fantastic summer.

== Cast ==
- Fredrik Becklén as Hugo Andersson
- Marie Öhman as Josephine (Jenny Grå)
- Beppe Wolgers as Gudmarsson, gardener and Hugo's uncle
- Inga Landgré as Josephine's mother
- Helena Brodin as Miss Ingrid Sund, the teacher
- Bellan Roos as Lyra, the lonely old woman on a bicycle
- Karl Carlsson as Karl Carlsson
- Tord Stål as Josephine's father (voice)
