= I Am Curious (Yellow) =

1967 Swedish erotic drama film by Vilgot Sjöman

- North American release poster
- Swedish: Jag är nyfiken – en film i gult
- Directed by: Vilgot Sjöman
- Written by: Vilgot Sjöman (uncredited)
- Produced by: Göran Lindgren (uncredited); Lena Malmsjö
- Starring: Vilgot Sjöman; Lena Nyman; Börje Ahlstedt
- Cinematography: Peter Wester (uncredited)
- Edited by: Wic Kjellin (uncredited)
- Music by: Bengt Ernryd (uncredited)
- Distributed by: Grove Press (United States)
- Release date: 9 October 1967
- Running time: 122 minutes
- Country: Sweden
- Languages: Swedish; English
- Box office: $27.7 million (US/Sweden)

I Am Curious (Yellow) (Swedish: Jag är nyfiken – en film i gult, lit. 'I Am Curious: A Film in Yellow') is a 1967 Swedish erotic drama film written and directed by Vilgot Sjöman, starring Sjöman and Lena Nyman. It is a companion film to 1968's I Am Curious (Blue); the two were initially intended to be one 3 1/2 hour film.

== Plot ==
Director Vilgot Sjöman plans to make a social film starring his lover (played by Lena Nyman), a young theatre student who has a strong interest in social issues.

Nyman's character, also named Lena, lives with her father in a small apartment in Stockholm and is driven by a burning passion for social justice and a need to understand the world, people and relationships. Her little room is filled with books, papers, and boxes full of clippings on topics such as "religion" and "men", and files on each of the 23 men with whom she has had sex. The walls are covered with pictures of concentration camps and a portrait of Francisco Franco, reminders of the crimes being perpetrated against humanity. She walks around Stockholm and interviews people about social classes in society, conscientious objection, gender equality, and the morality of vacationing in Franco's Spain. She and her friends also picket embassies and travel agencies. Lena's relationship with her father, who briefly went to Spain to fight Franco as part of the International Brigades, is problematic, and she is distressed by the fact that he returned from Spain for unknown reasons after only a short period.

Through her father Lena meets the slick Bill (Börje in the original Swedish), who works at a menswear shop and voted for the Rightist Party. They begin a love affair, but Lena soon finds out from her father that Bill has another woman, Marie, and a young daughter. Lena is furious that Bill has not been open with her, and goes to the country on a bicycle holiday. Alone in a cabin in the woods, she attempts an ascetic life-style, meditating, studying nonviolence and practicing yoga. Bill soon comes looking for her in his new car. She greets him with a shotgun, but they soon make love. Lena confronts Bill about Marie, and finds out about another of his lovers, Madeleine. They fight and Bill leaves. Lena has strange dreams, in which she ties two teams of soccer players – she notes that they number 23 – to a tree, shoots Bill and cuts his penis off. She also dreams of being taunted by passing drivers as she cycles down a road, until finally Martin Luther King Jr. drives up. She apologizes to him for not being strong enough to practice nonviolence.

Lena returns home, destroys her room, and goes to the car showroom where Bill works to tell him she has scabies. They are treated at a clinic, and then go their separate ways. As the embedded story of Lena and Bill begins to resolve, the film crew and director Sjöman are featured more. The relationship between Lena the actress and Bill the actor has become intimate during the production of Vilgot's film, and Vilgot is jealous and clashes with Bill. The film concludes with Lena returning Vilgot's keys as he meets with another young female theatre student.

=== Nonfictional content ===
The film includes an interview with Dr. Martin Luther King Jr., filmed in March 1966, when King was visiting Stockholm along with Harry Belafonte with a view to starting a new initiative for Swedish support of African Americans. The film also includes an interview with the Minister of Transportation, Olof Palme (later Prime Minister of Sweden), who talks about the existence of class structure in Swedish society (he was told it was for a documentary film), and footage of the Russian poet Yevgeny Yevtushenko.

== Cast ==
- Vilgot Sjöman as himself
- Lena Nyman as Lena
- Börje Ahlstedt as Börje
- Peter Lindgren as Lena's father
- Chris Wahlström as Rune's woman
- Marie Göranzon as Marie
- Magnus Nilsson as Magnus
- Ulla Lyttkens as Ulla
- Anders Ek as Exercise leader
- Martin Luther King Jr. as himself
- Olof Palme as himself
- Yevgeny Yevtushenko as himself

Uncredited roles

- Holger Löwenadler as The King
- Bertil Norström as Factory worker
- Dora Söderberg Old lady in elevator
- Öllegård Wellton as Yevtushenko's Interpreter
- Sven Wollter as Captain

== Release ==
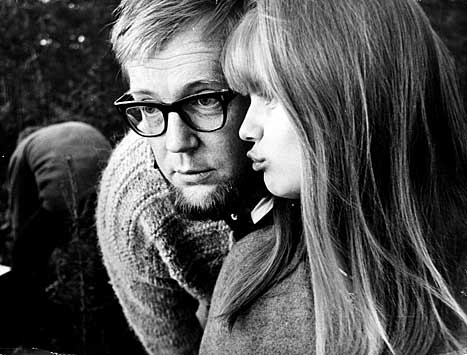
Director Vilgot Sjöman together with actress Lena Nyman.

=== Censorship ===
The film includes numerous and frank scenes of nudity and staged sexual intercourse. One particularly controversial scene features Lena kissing her lover's (Borje's) flaccid penis. Released in Sweden in October 1967, it was released in the U.S. in March 1969, immediately attracting a ban in Massachusetts for being pornographic, with the Boston Police Department seizing the film reels from the Symphony Cinemas I & II on Huntington Avenue. After proceedings in the United States District Court for the District of Massachusetts (Karalexis v. Byrne, 306 F. Supp. 1363 (D. Mass. 1969)), the United States Court of Appeals for the Second Circuit, and the Supreme Court of the United States (Byrne v. Karalexis, 396 U.S. 976 (1969) and 401 U.S. 216 (1971)), the Second Circuit found the film not to be obscene.

The Maryland film censorship board banned the film's exhibition in the state on 8 July 1969, in a decision backed by Francis B. Burch, who was the state's attorney general at the time; he described the film as hard-core pornography. The ruling was challenged by the American Civil Liberties Union, and although an appeals court eventually declared that the film was not obscene, the ban was ultimately upheld with a split 4-3 vote. On 3 December 1969, in response to the ruling, the film's American importer, Grove Press, took the case for distributing the film in all states to the U.S. Supreme Court, sparking a legal battle that spanned three years, ultimately ending in 1972, when Grove Press agreed to remove a minute and a half from the film for its Maryland showing.

An arsonist set a fire in the Heights Theatre in Houston during the film's run there. In April 1970, sheriff's deputies in Pensacola, Florida, seized prints of I Am Curious (Yellow), as well as Dracula (The Dirty Old Man), from the Ritz Theatre on N Tarragona St; the theater's manager was charged with "two counts of unlawful showing of an obscene film and maintaining a public nuisance".

The film opened at the Vogue Art Theater in Denver, Colorado on 8 August 1969; hours after it opened there, it was seized by District Attorney Mike McKevitt, who promptly banned the film from being shown in the city, due to it violating a then-new obscenity law that was passed in the state; McKevitt had complained to District Judge Edward J. Byrne that the film was "obscene and pornographic". The film's ban was challenged by its US importers, who succeeded in getting attorney Edward H. Sherman to return the film on 13 August 1969. On 21 August 1969, Byrne labelled the ban an act of censorship and a "prior restraint on the defendants' right to freedom of speech"; subsequent to this, he lifted the ban on the film. The film reopened at the Vogue Art on 22 August 1969, with 400 customers being reported as being in attendance.

Among other Scandinavian nations, it was allowed uncut in Denmark (which one year earlier had become the first country in the world to legalize pornography), while it was banned in Norway due to its explicit sexual content.

The film was censored by as much as 49 seconds in Australia between 1970 and 1971. In the United Kingdom, John Trevelyan, a secretary of the British Board of Film Censors trimmed the film by eight minutes, reducing its running time to 114 minutes. The Irish Film Censor's Office made two cuts to the film before its premiere in Ireland in 1973.

=== Box office ===
The film was popular at the box office and was the 12th most popular film in the United States and Canada in 1969 and the highest-grossing foreign-language film in the United States and Canada of all-time with a gross of $20,238,100. It was number one at the US box office for two weeks in November 1969. One reason it did so well was that it became popular among film stars to be seen going to the film. News of Johnny Carson seeing the film legitimized going to see it despite any misgivings about possible pornographic content. Jacqueline Onassis went to see the movie, judo-felling an awaiting news photographer, Mel Finkelstein, alerted by the theatre manager, while leaving the theatre during the showing.

=== Critical reception ===
==== Contemporary ====
Initial reception to Curious Yellow was divided. Vincent Canby of The New York Times referred to it as a "Good, serious movie about a society in transition". Norman Mailer described it as "one of the most important pictures I have ever seen in my life" and said he felt "like a better man" after having seen it. Conversely, Rex Reed said the movie was "vile and disgusting" and Sjöman was "a very sick Swede with an overwhelming ego and a fondness for photographing pubic hair". Roger Ebert of the Chicago Sun-Times lambasted it as "a dog... a real dog" and "stupid and slow and uninteresting".

In the UK, Patrick Gibbs of The Daily Telegraph wrote that "there's not much for patrons in this cinema-verite material, presented in the Godard style as if it were holy writ." Penelope Mortimer of The Observer wrote that "it is publicised as being very sexy. I have no more to say about it, except that that is a lie." Alexander Walker of the Evening Standard remarked that as a result of having been cut in the UK, it "will now never satisfy the curiosity of people who know it as the first Swedish film to show the sex act. Every scene of that kind has been severely 'reduced' by our censor and we are left with a dull film of almost parochial impact about a girl public opinion-tester endlessly asking Swedes their views of class, colour, war and pacificism—oddly enough, not sex, unless you take a protest poster that reads 'COLOURED PEOPLE BE PREPARED—THE WHITES ARE STAGGERING' to fall into that category."

==== Retrospective ====
In 1974, when an uncut version of the film debuted in Australia, critic Colin Bennett of The Age remarked that "almost the only fascination now lies in the revelation of what was considered far too notorious to be imported into [Australia] a few short years ago", adding that "sociologically, this satirical stuff may have had more point in 1967 Sweden, and I suppose it does reveal a modicum about Scandinavian social attitudes. It is also peculiarly dated. [...] One finds oneself no longer curious."

In recent years, Yellow has received some reappraisal, thanks in part to Gary Giddins, who authored the 2003 essay accompanying the Criterion Collection DVD release, and a review by Nathan Southern on the All Movie Guide website. Southern assesses the picture as "a droll and sophisticated comedy about the emotional, political, social, and sexual liberation of a young woman... a real original that has suffered from public incomprehension since its release and is crying out for reassessment and rediscovery".

As of August 2015, I Am Curious (Yellow) received a 52% rating based on 25 reviews, 13 "fresh" and 12 "rotten" on the review aggregate website Rotten Tomatoes.

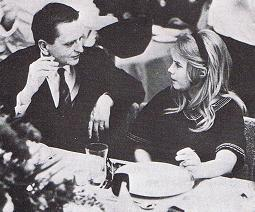
Olof Palme (who played himself in an uncredited role in the movie) and Lena Nyman, taken at the Guldbagge Award ceremony. Nyman won the 1967 award for Best Actress in a leading role.

=== Awards and honors ===
Nyman won the award for Best Actress at the 5th Guldbagge Awards for her role in this film and I Am Curious (Blue).

== In popular culture ==
Various television series have episodes with similar titles, such as Get Smart's series finale "I Am Curiously Yellow"; Moonlighting ("I Am Curious, Maddie"); The Simpsons ("I Am Furious (Yellow)"); That Girl ("I Am Curious Lemon"); Ed, Edd n Eddy ("I Am Curious Ed"); and The Partridge Family ("I Am Curious...Partridge").

Additionally, an issue of Superman's Girl Friend, Lois Lane, named "I Am Curious (Black)", focuses on Lois Lane, who becomes a black woman for a day to experience racism.

In Mad Men seventh season, episode 6, "The Strategy,” Don Draper references having just seen this movie in a theatre with his wife, Megan Draper.

Episode 285 of This American Life featured a story called "I Am Curious, Jello," which followed up on the censorship trial between Los Angeles prosecutor Michael Guarino and Dead Kennedys singer Jello Biafra two decades after the case was thrown out of court.

American car manufacturer Plymouth introduced a special order color for 1971. "Curious Yellow" is a vibrant greenish yellow, one of their "High-Impact" colors.

The eleventh studio album by the English post-punk band The Fall makes reference to the film in its title, I Am Kurious Oranj.

It made a question in Trivial Pursuit: "What Swedish sex film caused a stir in 1967?" Answer: I am Curious (Yellow).
