= Sunday's Children =

1992 film by Daniel Bergman

- Swedish cover
- Directed by: Daniel Bergman
- Written by: Ingmar Bergman
- Produced by: Katinka Faragó; Klas Olofsson
- Starring: Thommy Berggren; Henrik Linnros; Lena Endre
- Cinematography: Tony Forsberg
- Edited by: Darek Hodor
- Release date: 28 August 1992
- Running time: 118 minutes
- Country: Sweden
- Language: Swedish

Sunday's Children (Swedish: Söndagsbarn) is a 1992 Swedish drama film directed by Daniel Bergman and written by Ingmar Bergman. At the 28th Guldbagge Awards, the film won the award for Best Cinematography (Tony Forsberg), and Thommy Berggren was nominated for Best Actor.

Ingmar based his screenplay for Sunday's Children on the life of his father, Church of Sweden minister Erik Bergman. Author Geoffrey MacNab wrote that whereas Ingmar's recollections of Erik are damning in his 1982 film Fanny and Alexander, his 1991–92 study of his father is "far more forgiving" in The Best Intentions and Sunday's Children. Critic Vincent Canby also identified Sunday's Children as "a continuation" of Fanny and Alexander and The Best Intentions.

== Cast ==
- Thommy Berggren as Erik Bergman
- Henrik Linnros as Pu Bergman (young version)
- Per Myrberg as Pu Bergman (adult version/Ingmar Bergman)
- Lena Endre as Karin Bergman
- Jacob Leygraf as Dag
- Anna Linnros as Lillan
- Malin Ek as Märta
- Marie Richardson as Marianne
- Irma Christenson as Aunt Emma
- Birgitta Valberg as Grandmother
- Börje Ahlstedt as Uncle Carl
- Maria Bolme as Maj
- Majlis Granlund as Lalla
- Birgitta Ulfsson as Lalla
- Carl Magnus Dellow as Watchmaker
- Melinda Kinnaman as Blind girl

== Year-end lists ==
- 6th – Peter Rainer, Los Angeles Times
- Top 10 (listed alphabetically, not ranked) – Jimmy Fowler, Dallas Observer
- Top 10 (not ranked) – Howie Movshovitz, The Denver Post
