= Agneta Bolme Börjefors =

Swedish television host and actress (1941–2008)

Agneta Bolme Börjefors was a Swedish television presenter, television producer and royal reporter for Sveriges Television. Agneta Bolme was born in Stockholm, Sweden. Her brother, Tomas Bolme, is a Swedish actor. She recorded over 600 episodes of the children's show Drutten and Jena as Drutten, the Swedish incarnation of the Russian character Cheburashka.

Agneta Bolme Börjefors died on 11 August 2008, at the age of 67.

== Filmography ==
- 1957 - Snödrottningen (voice)
- 1969 - Drutten och Jena (voice); see also Cheburashka#Drutten och Jena
