= The Tattooed Widow =

1998 Swedish film by Lars Molin

The Tattooed Widow (Swedish: Den tatuerade änkan) is a Swedish International Emmy Award winning TV movie from 1998, written and directed by Lars Molin.

The film is centered on the sexagenarian (60+) woman Ester, played by Mona Malm. Ester lives in a somewhat failed marriage where she is expected to take care of the household and be a good grandmother. But when a female relative, Aunt Agnes, dies, everything changes. Agnes' death and a lot of money and a big apartment that Ester inherits from her offers Ester new possibilities and becomes an impulse for her to live her dreams.

In 1999 The Tattooed Widow was awarded an Emmy Award for best international TV movie.

== Cast ==
- Mona Malm – Ester Hershagen
- Sven Wollter – Erik Sandström
- Ingvar Hirdwall – Egon Andersson
- Jan Malmsjö – Leon Mark
- Gösta Bredefeldt – Allan Hershagen
- Pia Johansson – Anette Hershagen
- Per Graffman – Jörgen Ramberg
- Maria Kulle – Lillemor Hershagen
- Göran Forsmark – Joakim Hershagen
- Erland Josephson – Per Gunnarsson
- Niklas Falk – Cederberg
