= 23rd Guldbagge Awards =

Annual Swedish film awards ceremony

- Date: 1 February 1988
- Site: Magasin 113, Gothenburg, Sweden

Highlights
- Best Picture: Pelle the Conqueror

The 23rd Guldbagge Awards ceremony, presented by the Swedish Film Institute, honored the best Swedish films of 1987, and took place on 1 February 1988. Pelle the Conqueror directed by Bille August was presented with the award for Best Film.

== Awards ==
- Best Film: Pelle the Conqueror by Bille August
- Best Director: Kjell Grede for Hip Hip Hurrah!
- Best Actor: Max von Sydow for Pelle the Conqueror
- Best Actress: Lene Brøndum for Hip Hip Hurrah!
- Best Foreign Language Film: Out of Rosenheim by Percy Adlon
- Special Achievement: Bo Jonsson
- The Ingmar Bergman Award:
  - Inger Pehrsson
  - Ulf Berggren
