= Siska (film) =

1962 film

- Directed by: Alf Kjellin
- Written by: Ulla Isaksson; Vilgot Sjöman
- Produced by: Allan Ekelund
- Starring: Harriet Andersson; Lars Ekborg; Mona Malm
- Cinematography: Lasse Björne; Gunnar Fischer
- Edited by: Ulla Ryghe
- Music by: Jan Johansson
- Production company: Svensk Filmindustri
- Distributed by: Svensk Filmindustri
- Release date: 26 December 1962
- Running time: 76 minutes
- Country: Sweden
- Language: Swedish

Siska is a 1962 Swedish drama film directed by Alf Kjellin and starring Harriet Andersson, Lars Ekborg and Mona Malm. It was shot at the Råsunda Studios in Stockholm. The film's sets were designed by the art director Bibi Lindström.

== Plot ==
Siska, a young, female gynecologist struggles with what she wants in love and career. She is courted by a young man but is unwilling to enter into a relationship if it means limiting her freedom.

== Cast ==
- Harriet Andersson as Siska Olofsson
- Lars Ekborg as Bo Myrman
- Mona Malm as Louise
- Gertrud Fridh as Annabella Myrman
- Tor Isedal as Roland
- Peter Kylberg as Party guest
- Carl-Olof Alm as Passenger on Subway
- Ingrid Backlin as Midwife
- Bengt Bedrup as TV Announcer
- Jessie Flaws as Lillemor
- Göran Graffman as A-son
- Björn Gustafson as Conscription Buddy
- Eivor Landström as Lying-in Woman
- Jan-Erik Lindqvist as Captain
- Fredrik Ohlsson as B-son

== Bibliography ==
- Qvist, Per Olov & von Bagh, Peter. Guide to the Cinema of Sweden and Finland. Greenwood Publishing Group, 2000.
