= Creditors (1988 film) =

- Directed by: Stefan Böhm; Keve Hjelm; John Olsson
- Written by: August Strindberg (play)
- Produced by: Lars Johansson
- Starring: Bibi Andersson
- Cinematography: John Olsson
- Release date: 21 November 1988
- Running time: 118 minutes
- Country: Sweden
- Language: Swedish

Creditors (Swedish: Fordringsägare) is a 1988 Swedish drama film based upon the play by August Strindberg. It was directed by Stefan Böhm, Keve Hjelm and John Olsson. Tomas Bolme won the award for Best Actor at the 24th Guldbagge Awards.

== Plot ==
The depressed Adolf has been visited by his new friend Gustav who is in contact with him about what he is going to do with his wife Tekla.

== Cast ==
- Bibi Andersson as Tekla
- Tomas Bolme as Adolf
- Keve Hjelm as Gustav
