= Instead of Abracadabra =

2008 short Swedish film

- Directed by: Patrik Eklund
- Produced by: Mathias Fjellström
- Starring: Simon J. Berger; Jacob Nordenson; Anki Larsson; Göran Forsmark
- Release date: 28 January 2008
- Running time: 22 minutes
- Country: Sweden
- Language: Swedish

Instead of Abracadabra (original title Istället för Abrakadabra) is a 2008 short comedy film, directed by Patrik Eklund and produced by Mathias Fjellström. It was nominated for the "Best Short Film, Live Action" award at the Academy Awards 2010. It was also nominated for the "Short Film Grand Jury Prize" at the Sundance Film festival 2009.

== Plot ==
Thomas, a young man who's passionate about becoming a magician faces increasing pressure from his parents to get a regular job. A magic trick with swords goes wrong, putting his mother into the emergency room. She escapes with little harm. Thomas meets Monika, a nurse at the hospital who as it turns out is a neighbor. She asks Thomas to perform at a kids' birthday party at her home. When the magic show ends, Monika inquires where Thomas will be performing next because she is keen to attend it. Thomas impulsively says he will be performing at the 60th birthday celebration of his father next Friday. Now he has the task of persuading his father to let him perform on Friday. His father is very skeptical about Thomas' magic tricks because of the accident that sent his wife to the hospital. He relents when Thomas promises to get a regular job and agrees not to use swords. On the day of the birthday, Thomas, unbeknownst to everyone else hires an actor to join the audience. He invites this actor on stage to perform the sword trick. The trick goes wrong and it seems the actor has been killed or is at least grievously injured. However the actor gets up with a start. It becomes clear that Thomas and the actor were fooling the audience. Everyone, especially Thomas' father is relieved.

== Reception and awards ==
Instead of Abracadabra was well received by critics. Richard Propes of The Independent Critic said, "Patrik Eklund has a strong knack for telling a rather basic story in fresh and vibrant ways" and described him as "a great example of the new cinematic visionaries coming out of Sweden". Richard Propes, Daily Film Dose as well as The New York Times said the film was reminiscent of Napoleon Dynamite in genre.
