= Tony Forsberg =

Swedish cinematographer (1933–2026)

- Born: Tonny Olof Forsberg; 13 August 1933
- Died: 11 October 2026 (aged 93)
- Occupation: Cinematographer
- Years active: 1955–2002

Tonny Olof Forsberg (13 August 1933 – 11 October 2026) was a Swedish cinematographer. At the 28th Guldbagge Awards he won the award for Best Cinematography for the film Sunday's Children. He has worked on more than 60 films and television shows between 1955 and 2002.

Forsberg died on 11 October 2026, at the age of 93.

== Selected filmography ==
- Lovely Is the Summer Night (1961)
- Ticket to Paradise (1962)
- A Sunday in September (1963)
- What the Swedish Butler Saw (1975)
- Summer Paradise (1977)
- The Adventures of Picasso (1978)
- Sally and Freedom (1981)
- When the Raven Flies (1984)
- Sunday's Children (1992)
- Murder at the Savoy (1993)
- In the Presence of a Clown (1997)
