= Dracula (The Dirty Old Man) =

- Something Weird Video / American Genre Film Archive Blu-ray cover art
- Directed by: William Edwards
- Written by: William Edwards
- Produced by: William Edwards
- Starring: Vince Kelley; Ann Hollis; Bill Whitton; Libby Caculus
- Edited by: Ludwig Moner
- Production companies: Whit Boyd Productions; Vega International Pictures
- Distributed by: Art Films
- Release date: 1969
- Running time: 69 minutes
- Country: United States
- Language: English

Dracula (The Dirty Old Man) is a 1969 American erotic horror comedy film written, produced, and directed by William Edwards.

== Cast ==
- Vince Kelley as Alucard / Dracula
- Ann Hollis as Ann
- Libby Caculus as Marge
- Joan Pickett as Joan
- Bill Whitton as Mike / Irving Jackalman
- Sue Allen as Carol
- Adarainne as Susan
- Ron Scott as Bob / Narrator
- Bob Whitton as Station Attendant
- Rebecca Reynolds as Stranded Girl

== Production ==
Filming took place in Los Angeles, California, and Texas.

== Release ==
Dracula (The Dirty Old Man) was theatrically released in 1969.

In April 1970, sheriff's deputies in Pensacola, Florida, seized prints of Dracula (The Dirty Old Man) and the unrelated Swedish film I Am Curious (Yellow) from the Ritz Theatre on N Tarragona St, charging the theater's manager with "two counts of unlawful showing of an obscene film and maintaining a public nuisance".

== Home media ==
In the 1990s, Dracula (The Dirty Old Man) was released on VHS by Something Weird Video. In 2002, Something Weird released the film on DVD as a double feature with 1971's Guess What Happened to Count Dracula.

In May 2023, Dracula (The Dirty Old Man) was released on Blu-ray in by Something Weird in collaboration with American Genre Film Archive.

== Reception ==
In 2017, author Bryan Senn wrote of the film: "Pathetic in all categories (even the pulchritude on display is spectacularly below-average), Dracula (The Dirty Old Man) will sorely try the patience (and fast-forward button) of anyone not already enamored of The Mummy and the Curse of the Jackals. And that's everyone."

In 2023, Brian Orndorf of Blu-ray.com wrote that, "it's a challenge to sit through [Dracula (The Dirty Old Man)], which doesn't offer considered comedy, just crude riffing from people with a limited imagination for humor." Orndorf concluded that the film is "best viewed as a curiosity from producers desperate to do something with a filmmaking plan that didn't work out."
