= 491 (film) =

1964 film

- Theatrical release poster
- Directed by: Vilgot Sjöman
- Written by: Lars Görling (also novel); Vilgot Sjöman
- Produced by: Lars-Owe Carlberg
- Starring: Lars Lind
- Cinematography: Gunnar Fischer
- Edited by: Lennart Wallén
- Music by: Georg Riedel
- Distributed by: Svensk Filmindustri
- Release date: 16 March 1964
- Running time: 101 minutes
- Country: Sweden
- Language: Swedish

491 is a 1964 Swedish black-and-white drama film directed by Vilgot Sjöman, based on a novel by Lars Görling. The story is about a group of youth criminals who are chosen to participate in a social experiment in which they are assigned to live together in an apartment while being supervised by two forgiving social workers. The film's tagline is: "It is written that 490 times you can sin and be forgiven. This motion picture is about the 491st."

This controversial film, which featured a male homosexual rape scene, was first banned in Sweden, but was rereleased after reediting. One of the excised scenes depicted a woman being raped by a dog. The film was also banned in Norway until 1971. The British Board of Film Classification refused to certify the film in 1968, meaning it cannot be distributed in the United Kingdom.

== Cast ==
- Lars Lind as Krister
- Leif Nymark as Nisse
- Stig Törnblom as Egon
- Lars Hansson as Pyret
- Sven Algotsson as Jingis
- Torleif Cederstrand as Butcher
- Bo Andersson as Fisken
- Lena Nyman as Steva
- Frank Sundström as Inspector
- Åke Grönberg as Reverend Mild
- Mona Andersson as Kajsa
- Jan Blomberg as Tester
- Siegfried Wald as German Sailor
- Willem Fricke / Wilhelm Fricke as German Sailor
- Erik Hell as Policeman
- Leif Liljeroth as Policeman
