= The Pleasure Garden (1961 film) =

1961 film by Alf Kjellin

- Theatrical release poster
- Directed by: Alf Kjellin
- Written by: Ingmar Bergman; Erland Josephson
- Starring: Sickan Carlsson; Gunnar Björnstrand; Bibi Andersson
- Cinematography: Gunnar Fischer
- Edited by: Ulla Ryghe
- Distributed by: Svensk Filmindustri
- Release date: 26 December 1961
- Running time: 93 minutes
- Country: Sweden
- Language: Swedish

The Pleasure Garden (Swedish: Lustgården) is a 1961 Swedish comedy film directed by Alf Kjellin and written by Ingmar Bergman.

== Cast ==
- Sickan Carlsson as Fanny, waitress
- Gunnar Björnstrand as David Samuel Franzén
- Bibi Andersson as Anna, Fanny's daughter
- Per Myrberg as Emil
- Kristina Adolphson as Astrid Skog, book store proprietor
- Stig Järrel as Ludvig Lundberg
- Hjördis Petterson as Ellen, David's sister
- Gösta Cederlund as Liljedahl
