= Per Myrberg =

Swedish singer (1933–2023)

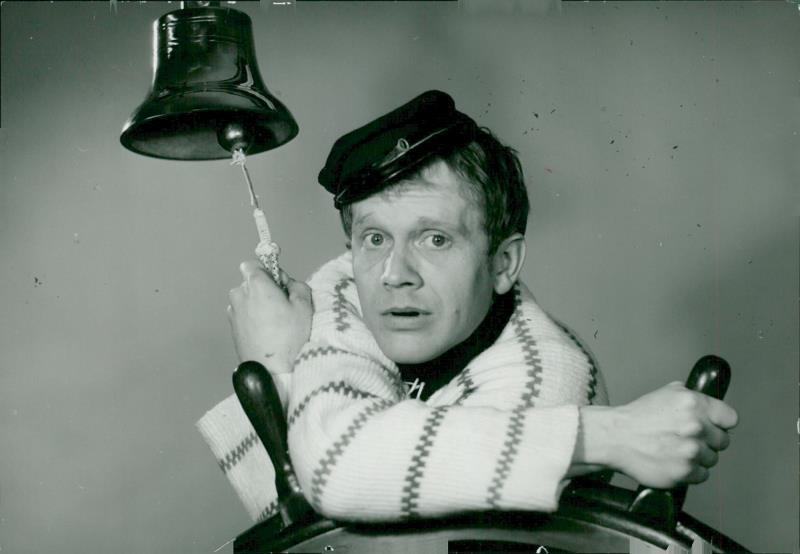
- Myrberg in 1961
- Born: Per Nils Myrberg; 11 July 1933; Stockholm, Sweden
- Died: 28 December 2023 (aged 90)
- Occupations: Actor, singer
- Years active: 1957–2016
- Children: Olle Myrberg; Fredrik Myrberg

Per Nils Myrberg (Swedish pronunciation: [pæːr ˈmŷːrbærj]; 11 July 1933 – 28 December 2023) was a Swedish singer and actor. He appeared in many films since 1957 including The Girl with the Dragon Tattoo. He also was a singer, having success at Svensktoppen.

== Early life ==
Myrberg was born on 11 July 1933 in Stockholm, Sweden, the son of city architect Nils Myrberg and singer Eva-Lisa Lennartsson. He originally wanted to be a jazz musician, but he applied and was accepted into the Royal Dramatic Training Academy in 1955, and he graduated in 1957.

== Career ==
Myrberg started acting in theater at Lilla Teatern (1962–1963), and later at Scala and Folkan.

Myrberg was a versatile actor and performer who also performed in cabaret showcases. He also was a singer and placed at number one in the Svensktoppen in 1964 for 40 weeks straight with the song "34:an", a Swedish cover of Stuart Hamblen's hit "This Ole House". He also performed opera in the 1998 operatic Staden. In 1957, he made his acting debut in the film Värmlänningar. He also had comedic roles in films like Adam och Eva in 1963, but also appeared in dramatic roles such as in Älskarinnan in 1962.

Myrberg worked in television productions as Hedebyborna broadcast on SVT. One of his more internationally known works is in The Girl with the Dragon Tattoo opposite Daniel Craig and Rooney Mara.

In later years, Myrberg appeared in roles in the SVT drama series Saltön in 2005, and Gynekologen i Askim in 2007.

In 1988, Myrberg was awarded the Litteris et Artibus.

== Personal life and death ==
He was the father of four biological children and had two stepchildren (son and daughter), two sons named Fredrik and Patrik Myrberg, and one daughter named Sofia Stenström. In early 2023, Myrberg suffered a stroke.

Myrberg was married from 1953 to 1960 to Margot Land. His second marriage was to author Barbro Myrberg from 1960 to 1976; the couple had two sons together. In 1978, he became a father again with girlfriend Madeleine Stenström; she gave birth to a daughter.

In 2003, he married again, this time to Sara Larsson; in 1992 she gave birth to a son named Axel.

Myrberg died on 28 December 2023, at age 90.

== Filmography ==
Year	Title	Role	Notes
1957	Värmlänningarna		
1960	The Judge	Krister Langton	
1961	The Pleasure Garden	Emil	
1962	The Mistress	The Boy	
1963	Adam och Eva	Adam Tapper	
1965	The Cats	Johnny	
1966	Ön	Count Magnus	
1966	Myten	Harry Holgersson	
1969	Made in Sweden	Jörgen Stenberg	
1974	A Handful of Love	Sebastian Renholm	
1975	Garaget	Ulf Billgren	
1977	Summer Paradise	Ture	
1982	The Simple-Minded Murderer	Andersson	
1986	The Blessed Ones	Sune Burman	TV movie
1987	Malacca	The father	
1987	Los dueños del silencio	Chief Editor	
1990	Hemligheten	Falk	
1990	Honungsvargar	Artur	
1992	Sunday's Children	Ingmar	
1995	Alfred	Ludvig Nobel	
1998	Blind Light	Axel Munthe	
2007	Elias og kongeskipet	Admiral Pang	Swedish version, Voice
2007	Arn – The Knight Templar	Berättarröst	Voice
2011	The Girl with the Dragon Tattoo	Harald	
2013	Tyskungen	Frans Ringholm	
2015	I nöd eller lust	Tore	
