= Birgitta Pettersson =

Swedish actress

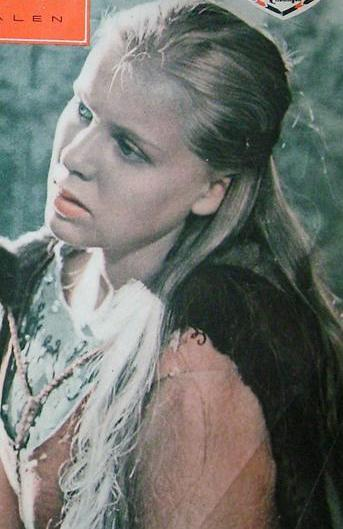
- Pettersson in The Virgin Spring
- Born: 7 January 1939 (age 86); Uppsala, Sweden
- Occupation: Actress
- Years active: 1954–1998

Birgitta Pettersson (born 7 January 1939) is a Swedish film actress. She is best known for her appearances in several films by director Ingmar Bergman. She was born in Uppsala, Sweden.

== Filmography ==
Year	Title	Role	Notes	Ref.
1954	Salka Valka	Young Salka Valka		
1955	The People of Hemsö	Lotta		
1958	The Magician	Sanna		
1960	The Virgin Spring	Karin		
1960	When Darkness Falls	Elisabeth Ryden		
1961	The Boy in the Tree	Marie		
1974	Rulle på Rullseröd	Annika, Rulle's mother	Series; 16 episodes	
1997	In the Presence of a Clown	Hanna Apelblad		
1998	Skärgårdsdoktorn	Mamma Gilberg	Episode: "Sensommargäster"	
2014	Love Is a Drug	Dam på sjukhus		
