= Gun Jönsson =

Swedish actress (1929–2021)

- Born: Gun Vera Birgit Irene Jönsson Lindqvist; 13 December 1929; Vetlanda, Sweden
- Died: 27 October 2021 (aged 91)
- Occupation: Actress
- Years active: 1948–2006

Gun Jönsson (13 December 1929 – 27 October 2021) was a Swedish actress. She appeared in more than 20 films and television shows between 1948 and 2006.

== Selected filmography ==
- Harry Munter (1969)
- A Guy and a Gal (1975)
