= I Am Curious (Blue) =

- Criterion Collection DVD cover
- Swedish: Jag är nyfiken – en film i blått
- Directed by: Vilgot Sjöman
- Written by: Vilgot Sjöman
- Produced by: Göran Lindgren
- Starring: Vilgot Sjöman; Peter Lindgren; Lena Nyman; Börje Ahlstedt; Marie Göranzon
- Cinematography: Peter Wester
- Edited by: Wic Kjellin
- Music by: Bengt Ernryd
- Distributed by: Grove Press
- Release date: 11 March 1968
- Running time: 107 minutes
- Country: Sweden
- Languages: Swedish; English

I Am Curious (Blue) (Swedish: Jag är nyfiken – en film i blått, lit. 'I Am Curious: A Film in Blue') is a 1968 Swedish film directed by Vilgot Sjöman and starring Lena Nyman as a character named after herself. It is a companion film to 1967's I Am Curious (Yellow); the two were initially intended to be one 3½ hour film. The films are named after the colours of the Swedish flag.

Blue is a second version of Yellow, taking place before and after the first film. It has a more somber and bitterly satiric style, and a further explication of the framing narrative. Questions of lesbianism, religion and critiques of meritocracy are discussed.

== Plot ==
After the actress Lena had a sexual relationship with Börje, whose affairs with other women caused her to hate him and question her commitment to Martin Luther King Jr.'s philosophy of nonviolence, she continues to explore her sexuality and politics. She befriends a woman named Sonja, and they travel to Ströms Vattudal where they enjoy nude swimming and other excursions. While hiking, Lena also looks into a cabin and sees two women having lesbian sex. Lena returns to Stockholm, where she stays with the couple Hans and Bim. Bim notices Lena scratching herself, which Lena attributes to allergies. After Hans and Bim have an argument, Hans visits Lena in her bedroom. Bim enters with a magnifying glass and insists on looking at Lena's hand. She discovers Lena has scabies, disproving Lena's belief her constant itching owed to allergies and mosquito bites.

Lena approaches Börje in the car dealership where he now works, to inform him about the possibility that he also has scabies. He confirms he has been itching and accuses her of giving him the disease, citing her sexual promiscuity. She argues back he is just as promiscuous, resulting in a highly public heated argument. After he loses his job, they both head to the clinic for treatment.

== Reception ==
Lena Nyman won the award for Best Actress at the 5th Guldbagge Awards for her role in this film and I Am Curious (Yellow).

Blue was not as well-received as Yellow, earning a 48% rating on Rotten Tomatoes based on 25 reviews. In The New Yorker, Penelope Gilliatt said that "It is decked out with a lot of idiot sociology and seriously marred by its mock humor, which has the discomfort and occasional ugliness of a jape by a meagre-spirited schoolmaster." For the New York Times, Vincent Canby said "I'm not very fond of this sort of moviemaking, which tries to disarm conventional criticism by exploiting formlessness as meaningful itself, but I like Sjoman's sense of humor and sense of humanity, and his obvious affection for Lena."
