= The Mistress (1962 film) =

1962 film

- Swedish theatrical poster
- Directed by: Vilgot Sjöman
- Written by: Vilgot Sjöman
- Produced by: Lars-Owe Carlberg; Allan Ekelund
- Starring: Bibi Andersson
- Cinematography: Lasse Björne
- Edited by: Lennart Wallén
- Release date: 8 October 1962
- Running time: 77 minutes
- Country: Sweden
- Language: Swedish

The Mistress (Swedish: Älskarinnan) is a 1962 Swedish drama film directed by Vilgot Sjöman. It marked Sjöman's directoral debut and was entered into the 13th Berlin International Film Festival where Bibi Andersson won the Silver Bear for Best Actress award. The film was also selected as the Swedish entry for the Best Foreign Language Film at the 35th Academy Awards, but was not accepted as a nominee.

== Cast ==
- Bibi Andersson - The Girl
- Birger Lensander - Conductor
- Per Myrberg - The Boy
- Gunnar Olsson - Old Man
- Birgitta Valberg - Motherly Woman
- Max von Sydow - Married Man
- Öllegård Wellton - Married Woman

== See also ==
- List of submissions to the 35th Academy Awards for Best Foreign Language Film
- List of Swedish submissions for the Academy Award for Best Foreign Language Film
