= Katinka Faragó =

Swedish film producer (1936–2024)

- Born: Katerina Faragó; 16 December 1936; Vienna, Austria
- Died: 26 November 2024 (aged 87); Vaxholm, Sweden
- Occupation: Film producer
- Years active: 1950–2004

Katerina Faragó (16 December 1936 – 26 November 2024) was a Swedish film producer. She was a member of the jury at the 43rd Berlin International Film Festival.

== Life and career ==
Katinka Faragó, of Jewish origin, came to Sweden in 1940 after her family fled Hungary and then Austria. Her father, the writer Alexander Faragó, who wrote screenplays for a number of Swedish films, sometimes took her along on film shoots. This led to her being scripted at the age of 17 for the film adaptation of Harry Martinson's Vägen till Klockrike (1953). A few years later, she started working with Ingmar Bergman. This collaboration lasted 30 years; Faragó worked with Bergman on 19 film productions.

Faragó was employed as a scriptwriter at Svensk Filmindustri from 1955 to 1965. She then worked as a freelance scriptwriter for a decade before becoming a production manager. For seven years she was production manager at Bergman's film company Cinematograph and was then appointed production manager and producer at the Swedish Film Institute (1985-1990). From 1990 to 2002 she was a producer at Sandrews.

Faragó married Raymond Lundberg in 1963, and in 1984 she married television producer Måns Reuterswärd. She had two daughters from her first marriage. Faragó died on 26 November 2024, at the age of 87.

== Selected filmography ==
- Fanny and Alexander (1982)
- Da Capo (1985)
- The Blessed Ones (1986)
- Katinka (1988)
- Leningrad Cowboys Go America (1989)
- Good Evening, Mr. Wallenberg (1990)
- Friends, Comrades (1991)
- Önskas (1991)
- Jönssonligan och den svarta diamanten (1992)
- Sunday's Children (1992)
- Sista dansen (1993)
- Tic Tac (1997)
