= Vilgot Sjöman =

Swedish writer and film director (1924–2006)

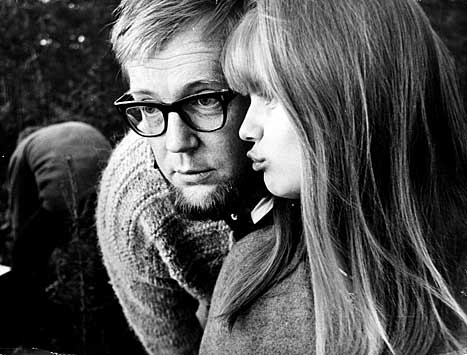
- Vilgot Sjöman with Lena Nyman during the production of I Am Curious (Yellow) from 1967.
- Born: David Harald Vilgot Sjöman; 2 December 1924; Stockholm, Sweden
- Died: 9 April 2006 (aged 81); Stockholm, Sweden
- Occupations: Writer, film director
- Years active: 1948–2004
- Spouses: Kristina Hasselgren (m. 1955–1960) Lotta Sjöman (m. 1969)

David Harald Vilgot Sjöman (2 December 1924 – 9 April 2006) was a Swedish writer and film director. His films deal with controversial issues of social class, morality, and sexual taboos, combining the emotionally tortured characters of Ingmar Bergman with the avant garde style of the French New Wave. He is best known as the director of the films 491 (1964), I Am Curious (Yellow) (in Swedish, "Jag är nyfiken – gul") (1967), and I Am Curious (Blue) ("Jag är nyfiken – blå") (1968), which stretched the boundaries of acceptability of what could then be shown on film, deliberately treating their subjects in a provocative and explicit manner.

== Career ==
Sjöman was born in Stockholm, in a working-class family. His father, Anders W. Sjöman, was a builder; his mother was Mandis Pettersson. Sjöman became a clerk with a cereal company aged 15, but passed his studentexamen in 1945 and studied at Stockholm University. He then worked in a prison while writing plays (none of which were produced). One play became his first novel, The Teacher ("Lektorn") (1955), which was filmed in 1952 by Gustaf Molander as Defiance ("Trots").

After taking up a scholarship to study film at UCLA in 1956, Sjöman worked with George Seaton on The Proud and Profane. He returned to Sweden, and wrote a study of Hollywood, In Hollywood ("I Hollywood") in 1961. Sjöman directed his first film in 1962, The Mistress ("Älskarinnan"), with a cast that included regular actors for Ingmar Bergman such as Bibi Andersson and Max von Sydow, showing a young woman in love with two men, one older and the other younger. For her role, Andersson won the Silver Bear for Best Actress award at the 13th Berlin International Film Festival. He assisted Ingmar Bergman with his 1963 film, Winter Light ("Nattvardsgästerna").

Sjöman's second film, 491, from 1964, is based on a novel by Lars Görling and deals with the issues of homosexuality and juvenile delinquency; it includes a scene in which a girl is raped, off-screen, by a dog. His fourth film, My Sister My Love (Syskonbädd 1782), from 1966, again starred Bibi Andersson and is based on 'Tis Pity She's a Whore, a 17th-century play by John Ford about incest between twins, a brother and sister.

His most well-known film, I Am Curious (Yellow), was a political film that examined Swedish society from a critical, leftist viewpoint, portraying a young working-class sociology student, played by Lena Nyman, interviewing people about social classes in Sweden. Filmed in a knowing cinéma vérité style, she asks, "Do we have a class system in Sweden?" and receives the reply, "It depends on the people. Undress them, and they're all the same; dress them, and you have a class system." The film also shows the protagonist's affair with a young man, played by Börje Ahlstedt, and sparked controversy both in Sweden and abroad because of its nudity and realistic scenes of sexual intercourse between the two lovers. Rex Reed said the movie was "vile and disgusting" and Sjöman was "a very sick Swede with an overwhelming ego and a fondness for photographing pubic hair", but Norman Mailer described it as "one of the most important pictures I have ever seen in my life".

An 11-minute section was cut by the British censor, and copies of the film were seized by U.S. Customs in January 1968 as obscene, and banned as pornography in most of the United States. After the US Supreme Court overturned the anti-obscenity ban on First Amendment grounds, the film was screened from March 1969 in US venues—one in New York City, and another one in New Jersey. Also screen in Oklahoma City Oklahoma March 1969. However, the controversy surrounding the film guaranteed it large audiences, and it became and remained the most successful foreign film in the US for the next 23 years. Its title, and that of the 1968 sequel, I Am Curious (Blue), refers to the yellow and blue colours of the flag of Sweden. It marked a turning point in attitudes to censorship of screen nudity, and was followed by films such as Midnight Cowboy and Last Tango in Paris.

Sjöman returned to similar themes in later films. He directed Till Sex Do Us Part in 1971, a farce about a young married couple who believe they will die if they have sex, but most of his later films were less successful. His 1974 film A Handful of Love won the awards for Best Film and Best Director at the 10th Guldbagge Awards.

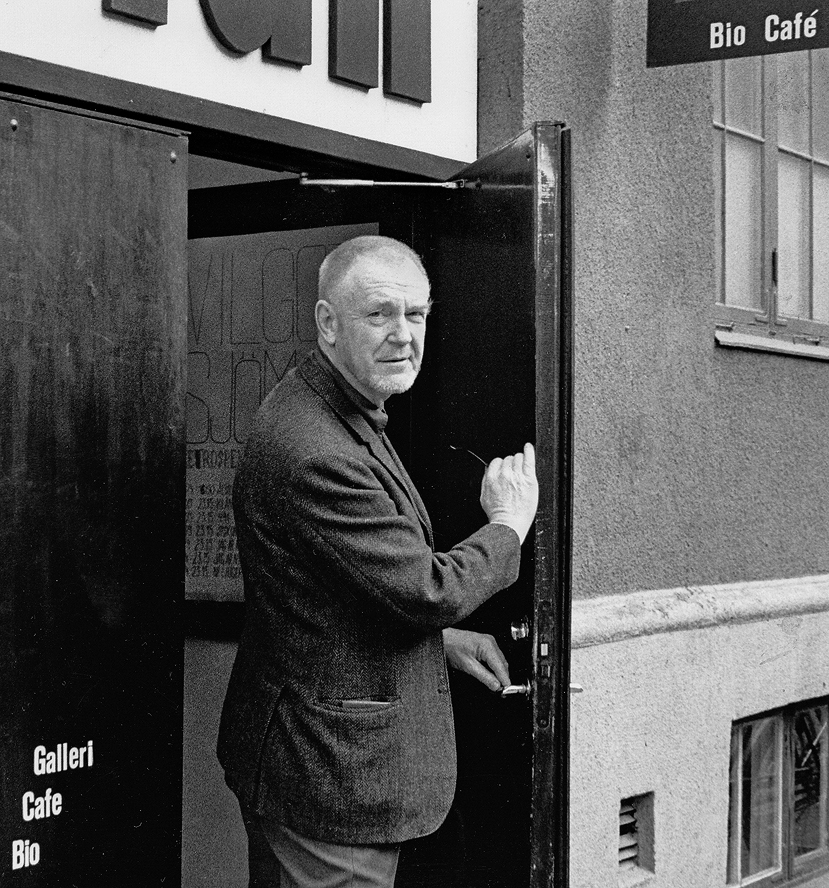
Vilgot Sjöman in 1987

He directed his last film in 1995, a biography of Alfred Nobel, inventor, industrialist, and founder of the Nobel Prizes, entitled Alfred.

He died at age 81 from a cerebral haemorrhage in St. Görans Sjukhus in Stockholm, leaving behind his wife of 37 years and three children.

Shortly after his death, a Swedish appeal court upheld a ruling that Swedish television broadcaster TV4 had damaged his and fellow director Claes Eriksson's "artistic integrity" by inserting commercial breaks into broadcasts of their films without their consent. He had been awarded the Ingmar Bergman Prize in 2003 for pursuing this court case.

== Filmography ==
=== Director ===
- The Mistress (Älskarinnan) (1962)
- Ingmar Bergman Makes a Movie (Ingmar Bergman gör en film) (1963)
- The Dress (Klänningen) (1964)
- 491 (1964)
- Negressen i skåpet (1965, Short)
- My Sister My Love (Syskonbädd 1782) (1966)
- Stimulantia (1967)
- I Am Curious (Yellow) (Jag är nyfiken – en film i gult) (1967)
- I Am Curious (Blue) (Jag är nyfiken – en film i blått) (1968)
- You're Lying (Ni ljuger) (1969)
- Journey with Father (Resa med far) (1969, Short)
- Blushing Charlie (Lyckliga skitar) (1970)
- Till Sex Do Us Part (Troll) (1971)
- Älskade Jeanette MacDonald! (1972, Short)
- Bröderna Karlsson (1974)
- A Handful of Love (En handfull kärlek) (1974)
- The Garage (Garaget) (1975)
- Taboo (Tabu) (1975)
- Linus and the Mysterious Red Brick House (Linus eller Tegelhusets hemlighet) (1979)
- Brevet till Lotta (1979, Short)
- Lekhagen (1980, Short)
- I Am Blushing (Jag rodnar) (1981)
- Malacca (1987)
- En flicka kikar i ett fönster (1987)
- Oskuld och sopor (1988)
- The Pitfall (Fallgropen) (1989)
- En ros till Ingemar (1989, Short)
- Mannen i buren (1990, Short)
- Self Portrait '92 (1992, Short)
- Alfred (1995)

=== Actor ===
- I Am Curious (Yellow) (Jag är nyfiken – en film i gult) (1967) - Vilgot Sjöman
- I Am Curious (Blue) (Jag är nyfiken – en film i blått) (1968) - Vilgot Sjöman
- Shame (1968) - TV-intervjuaren
- You're Lying (Ni ljuger) (1969) - Film director (uncredited)
- Till Sex Do Us Part (Troll) (1971) - Man (final film role)
