= Harry Munter =

1969 film

- Directed by: Kjell Grede
- Written by: Kjell Grede
- Produced by: Göran Lindgren
- Starring: Georg Adelly
- Cinematography: Lasse Björne
- Edited by: Lars Hagström
- Release date: 20 December 1969
- Running time: 101 minutes
- Country: Sweden
- Language: Swedish

Harry Munter is a 1969 Swedish drama film directed by Kjell Grede. It was entered into the 1970 Cannes Film Festival. At the 7th Guldbagge Awards Carl-Gustaf Lindstedt won the award for Best Actor.

== Cast ==
- Georg Adelly - Manne
- Märta Allan-Johnson - Grandma
- Gerda Calander - Kristina Birgitta Eleonor
- Inga Dahlbeck - Girl #1
- Britt Marie Engstroem - Girl #2
- Gun Jönsson - Gudrun Munter
- Carl-Gustaf Lindstedt - Valle Munter
- Marie-Louise Mark
- Jan Nielsen - Harry Munter
- Elina Salo - Lonely Woman
- Alan Simon - Mr. Burne
- Palle Westerlund - Grim
