= Tor Isedal =

Swedish actor

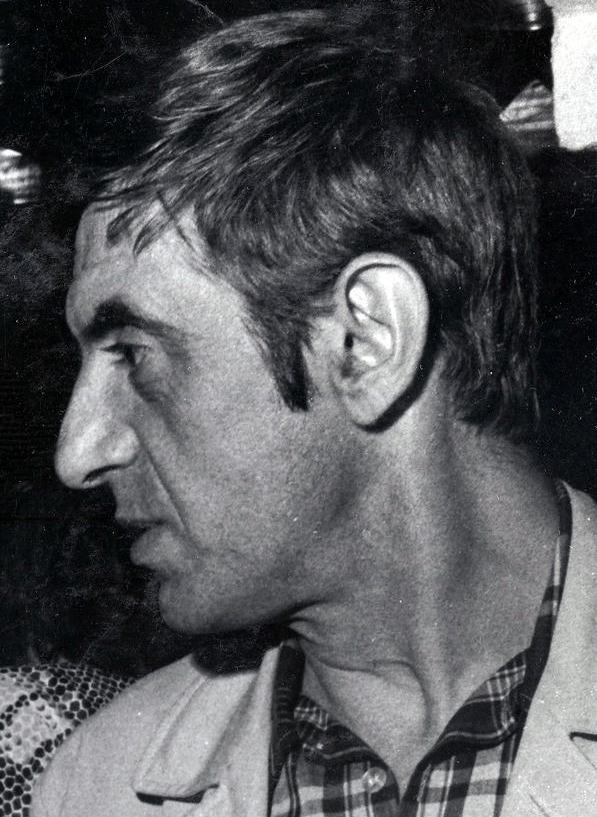
- Isedal at the opening of a Stockholm disco, May 1970.
- Born: 20 July 1924; Norrköping, Sweden
- Died: 18 February 1990 (aged 65); Nynäshamn, Sweden
- Occupation: Actor
- Years active: 1952-1990

Tor Isedal (20 July 1924 – 18 February 1990) was a Swedish actor on stage, screen and television. He appeared in more than 70 films between 1952 and 1990. One of his sons is Swedish actor Ola Isedal.

== Partial filmography ==
- She Came Like the Wind (1952)
- The Road to Klockrike (1953)
- The Magnificent Lie (1955)
- Rabies (1958)
- The Virgin Spring (1960)
- Rififi in Stockholm (1961)
- Siska (1962)
- The Lady in White (1962)
- Hide and Seek (1963)
- Swedish Wedding Night (1964)
- Morianna (1965)
- Ormen (1966)
- Roseanna (1967)
- Pippi in the South Seas (1970)
- The Lustful Vicar (1970)
- Exponerad (1971)
- The Day the Clown Cried (1972) (unreleased)
