= Kjell Grede =

Swedish film director

- Born: Kjell Birger Grede; 12 August 1936; Stockholm, Sweden
- Died: 15 December 2017 (aged 81)
- Occupations: Film director Screenwriter
- Years active: 1967–2003
- Spouses: Bibi Andersson (m. 1960; div. 1973) Anita Holmberg (m. 1975)
- Children: Jens Grede

Kjell Birger Grede (12 August 1936 – 15 December 2017) was a Swedish film director. He directed nine films between 1967 and 2003. He was married to actress Bibi Andersson from 1960 to 1973.

His 1967 film Hugo and Josephine won the Guldbagge Award for Best Film and Grede won the award for Best Director at the 5th Guldbagge Awards. His film Harry Munter was entered into the 1970 Cannes Film Festival. His 1987 film Hip Hip Hurrah! won him the award for Best Director at the 23rd Guldbagge Awards. In 1991 his film Good Evening, Mr. Wallenberg was entered into the 41st Berlin International Film Festival and won four awards at the 26th Guldbagge Awards, including Best Film and Best Direction.

== Filmography ==
- Hugo och Josefin (1967)
- Harry Munter (1969)
- Klara Lust (1972)
- En enkel melodi (1974)
- Min älskade (1979)
- Stängda dörrar (1981)
- Hip Hip Hurra! (1987)
- God afton, Herr Wallenberg (1990)
- Kommer du med mig då (2003)
