= 5th Guldbagge Awards =

Annual Swedish film awards ceremony

- Date: 21 October 1968
- Site: Spegeln & Operaterrassen, Stockholm, Sweden

Highlights
- Best Picture: Hugo and Josephine

The 5th Guldbagge Awards ceremony, presented by the Swedish Film Institute, honored the best Swedish 1967 and 1968, and took place on 21 October 1968. Hugo and Josephine directed by Kjell Grede was presented with the award for Best Film.

== Awards ==
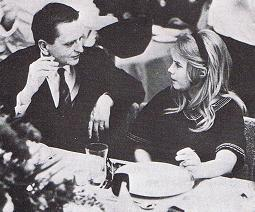
Olof Palme (left) and Lena Nyman at the 5th Guldbagge Awards ceremony.

- Best Film: Hugo and Josephine by Kjell Grede
- Best Director: Kjell Grede for Hugo and Josephine
- Best Actor: Halvar Björk for Badarna
- Best Actress: Lena Nyman for I Am Curious (Yellow) and I Am Curious (Blue)
