= Ön =

1966 film

- Film poster
- Directed by: Alf Sjöberg
- Written by: Bengt Jahnsson; Alf Sjöberg
- Starring: Per Myrberg
- Cinematography: Lasse Björne
- Edited by: Carl-Olov Skeppstedt
- Music by: Lars Johan Werle
- Release date: 31 January 1966
- Running time: 107 minutes
- Country: Sweden
- Language: Swedish

Ön (English: The Island) is a 1966 Swedish drama film directed by Alf Sjöberg. At the 3rd Guldbagge Awards Sjöberg won the award for Best Director. The film was also entered into the 1966 Cannes Film Festival.

== Cast ==
- Per Myrberg as Count Magnus
- Bibi Andersson as Marianne
- Karin Kavli as Old countess
- Marian Gräns as Helen Andersson
- Jan-Olof Strandberg as Johannes
- Ernst-Hugo Järegård as Vicar Byström
- Anders Andelius as Boman
- Mona Andersson as Mrs. Eriksson
- Björn Berglund as Dr. Ernst Forsman
- Sture Ericson as Viktor Sundberg
- Stig Gustavsson as Öberg
- Agda Helin as Mrs. Sundberg
- Erik Hell as Pettersson
- Olle Hilding as Persson
- Victoria Kahn as Helen Andersson - child
- Åke Lagergren as Olsson
- Birger Lensander as Parish clerk
- Sten Lonnert as Eriksson
- Gösta Prüzelius as Berg
- Sven-Bertil Taube as Police officer
- Torsten Wahlund as Lind the farm-hand
