= Alf Sjöberg =

Swedish film director (1903–1980)

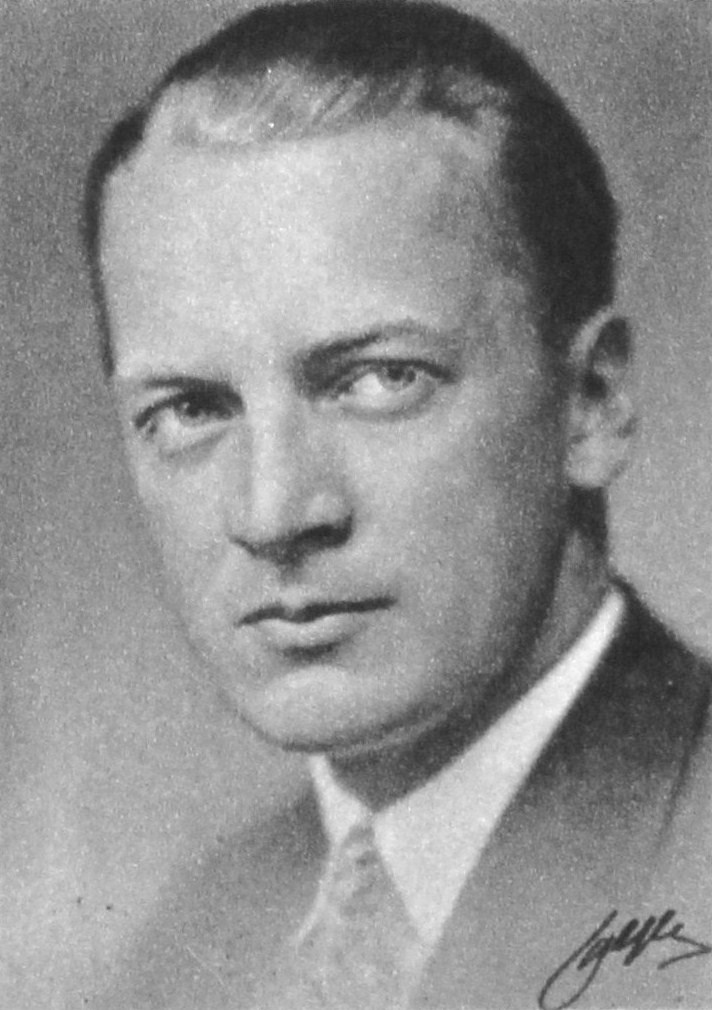
- Born: Sven Erik Alf Sjöberg; 21 June 1903; Stockholm, Sweden
- Died: 17 April 1980 (aged 76); Stockholm, Sweden
- Occupation: Film director
- Years active: 1925–1969
- Known for: Director
- Spouses: Märta Ekström; (m. 1930–1934): Elsa Ahlsell; (m. 1935–1980)

Sven Erik Alf Sjöberg (21 June 1903 – 17 April 1980) was a Swedish theatre and film director. He won the Grand Prix du Festival at the Cannes Film Festival twice: in 1946 for Torment (Swedish: Hets) (part of an eleven-way tie), and in 1951 for his film Miss Julie (Swedish: Fröken Julie) (an adaptation of August Strindberg's play which tied with Vittorio De Sica's Miracle in Milan).

Though he also achieved success in film, Sjöberg was foremost a stage director, and was well-regarded at the Royal Dramatic Theatre, where he was a First Director staging productions between 1930 and 1980. Sjöberg was also a pioneer director of drama for early Swedish television; his 1955 TV staging of Hamlet was considered a landmark production. At the 3rd Guldbagge Awards, Sjöberg won the award for Best Director for the film Ön.

In 1980, Sjöberg died in a car accident in Stockholm, on his way to rehearsal at the Royal Dramatic Theatre.

== Filmography ==
=== Actor ===
- Ingmar's Inheritance (1925)
- The Poetry of Ådalen (1928)
- Resan Bort (1945)

=== Director ===
- Den starkaste (1929)
- Med livet som insats (1940)
- Blossom Time (1940)
- Hem från Babylon (1941)
- The Heavenly Play (Himlaspelet) (1942)
- Kungajakt (1944)
- Torment (Hets) (1944) From a synopsis by Ingmar Bergman, who served as assistant director. Nominated for the Golden Lion at the Venice Film Festival in 1947. Shared the Grand Prix du Festival International du Film at the 1946 Cannes Film Festival
- The Journey Away (1945)
- Iris and the Lieutenant (Iris och löjtnantshjärta) (1946)
- Only a Mother (Bara en mor) (1949)
- Miss Julie (Fröken Julie) (1951) Shared the Grand Prix du Festival International du Film at the 1951 Cannes Film Festival
- Barabbas (1953)
- Karin Månsdotter (1954)
- Wild Birds (Vildfåglar) (1955)
- Last Pair Out (Sista paret ut) (1956)
- The Judge (Domaren) (1960)
- Ön (1966)
- The Father (1969)

=== Writer ===
- Med livet som insats (1940)
- Den blomstertid (1940)
- Hem från Babylon (1941)
- Only a Mother (Bara en mor) (1949)
- The Heavenly Play (Himlaspelet) (1942)
- Resan bort (1945)
- Miss Julie (Fröken Julie) (1951)
- Karin Månsdotter (1954)
- Wild Birds (Vildfåglar) (1955)
- The Judge (Domaren) (1960)
- Ön (1966)
