= The Devil's Eye =

1960 film by Ingmar Bergman

- Theatrical release poster
- Swedish: Djävulens öga
- Directed by: Ingmar Bergman
- Written by: Ingmar Bergman
- Starring: Jarl Kulle; Bibi Andersson; Nils Poppe; Gertrud Fridh; Sture Lagerwall; Stig Järrel; Gunnar Björnstrand
- Cinematography: Gunnar Fischer
- Edited by: Oscar Rosander
- Music by: Erik Nordgren
- Production company: Svensk Filmindustri
- Distributed by: Svensk Filmindustri
- Release date: 17 October 1960 (Sweden)
- Running time: 87 minutes
- Country: Sweden
- Language: Swedish

The Devil's Eye (Swedish: Djävulens öga) is a 1960 Swedish fantasy comedy film written and directed by Ingmar Bergman.

== Plot ==
In accordance with the Irish proverb that "A woman's chastity is a stye in the Devil's eye", Satan believes a pain he feels in his eye is a stye and it is being caused by a virgin on Earth. In particular, the pain is connected to Britt-Marie, the daughter of a vicar. Britt-Marie is still a virgin at 20, and she is engaged to a man named Jonas. Satan fears Britt-Marie may serve as an example to her friends to remain virgin, and opts to send Don Juan to seduce Britt-Marie. Don Juan is enduring what he considers a boring punishment: Repeatedly, a woman comes to him threatening to kill him, and he seduces her and takes her to bed. However, before any sex occurs, a demon emerges to say the "show is over", and the woman disappears. Satan comes to Don Juan, telling him he can go to Earth and if he seduces Britt-Marie, Satan will allow Don Juan to have a dreamless sleep, a relief from his punishment.

Don Juan accepts the challenge, accompanied by his servant Pablo. The demon also follows them, determined Pablo will not enjoy any sex while on Earth. Don Juan and Pablo meet the vicar, a happy and gullible man who invites them to his house. At the house, Pablo becomes enamoured with the vicar's wife, Renata. Don Juan meets Britt-Marie and attempts to seduce her, questioning her relationship with Jonas. She agrees to kiss him. The demon also stokes quarrels between Britt-Marie and Jonas, and Jonas leaves. During the night, Pablo seduces Renata. The demon appears to the vicar to tell him Renata is committing adultery, and gives him the key to Renata's bedroom. Instead of entering the bedroom, the vicar instead uses the key to lock the demon in his cupboard. The next morning, the demon tells the vicar he dreamed that while Renata slept with one of the vicar's guests, his daughter slept with the other.

Concerned, the vicar runs to Britt-Marie's bedroom, but finds her alone there. Don Juan has fallen in love with Britt-Marie and is unable to seduce her in his usual fashion; Satan laments his defeat. After Don Juan returns to hell, Satan learns Britt-Marie has married Jonas, and he takes her virginity on their wedding night. This alone does not cure Satan's eye. However, Britt-Marie lies to Jonas, claiming she had never kissed another man; the lie heals Satan, giving him a minor victory. Satan decides to put Don Juan to sleep, decreeing he will dream of love, a cruel punishment.

== Cast ==
- Jarl Kulle as Don Juan
- Bibi Andersson as Britt-Marie
- Stig Järrel as Satan
- Nils Poppe as The Vicar
- Gertrud Fridh as Renata
- Sture Lagerwall as Pablo
- Georg Funkquist as Count Armand de Rochefoucauld
- Gunnar Sjöberg as Marquis Giuseppe Maria de Macopanza
- Gunnar Björnstrand as The Actor

== Production ==
SF Studios required Bergman to make a comedy before agreeing to produce Bergman's idea for The Virgin Spring. The story was inspired by the Danish radio play The Return of Don Juan by Oluf Bang; Bergman was intrigued by the character's resurgent popularity. The "Irish proverb" cited in the film is fictional and was invented by Bergman.

== Release and reception ==
In 2018, The Criterion Collection released the film on Blu-ray in Region A, along with 38 other Bergman films, in the set Ingmar Bergman's Cinema. On the review aggregator website Rotten Tomatoes, The Devil's Eye holds an approval rating of 71% based on 7 reviews.
