= Guldbagge Awards =

Annual Swedish film awards ceremony

- Official logo
- Awarded for: Excellence in Swedish film
- Date: 1964; 62 years ago
- Country: Sweden
- Presented by: Swedish Film Institute
- Website: guldbaggen.se

The Guldbagge Awards (Swedish: Guldbaggen, lit. 'the golden scarab') is an official film awards ceremony in Sweden. Presented annually by Swedish Film Institute, the awards honors excellence in cinematic achievements in the Swedish film industry. It is described as the most prestigious in Sweden and the Swedish equivalent of the Academy Awards. Winners are awarded a statuette depicting a rose chafer, hence the name.

The first awards was presented in 1964 at Grand Hôtel in Stockholm. The awards was first televised in 1981 on SVT2, and has since then been broadcast, almost every year, on national channels SVT1, SVT2, or TV4.

== History ==
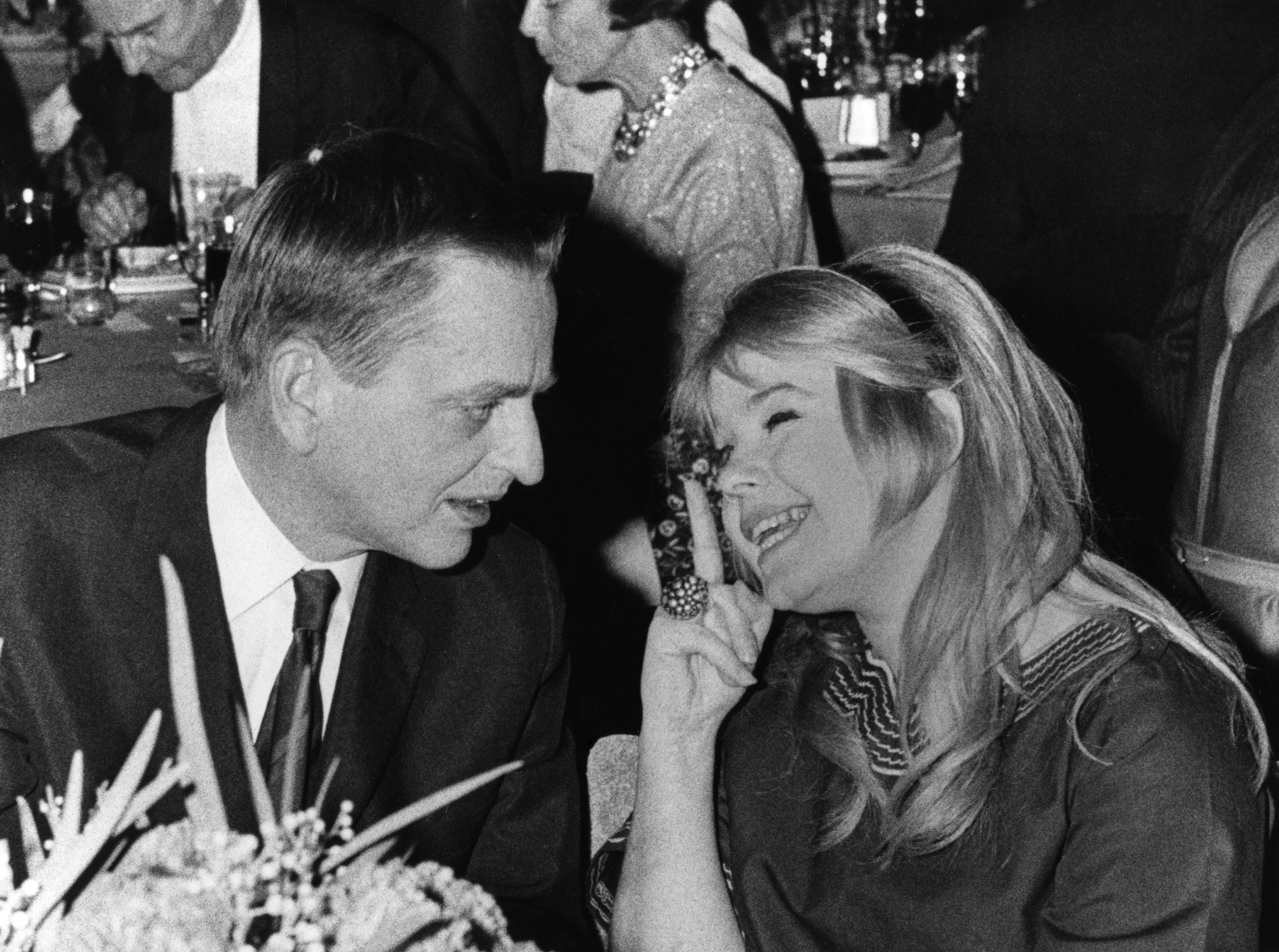
Olof Palme in a conversation with Lena Nyman, who received one of the three awards that were distributed at the 5th Guldbagge Awards.

The 1st Guldbagge Awards were presented on 25 September 1964, at a private party at Grand Hôtel in Stockholm. Four "guldbaggar" were awarded, honoring directors, actors, actresses and other personalities of the film-making industry of the time for their works during the 1963–64 period. The original categories were: Best Film, Best Director, Best Actor and Best Actress.

The first Best Actor awarded was Keve Hjelm, for his performance in Raven's End. The first Best Actress was awarded to Ingrid Thulin, for her performance in The Silence. The first Best Director were awarded to Ingmar Bergman, for his work on the film The Silence, which also won the first Best Film award. For a long time, the Guldbagge Awards were an exquisite exclusivity, and it was supposed to be so, and it took fifteen years before someone managed to win a second time, which was Keve Hjelm, receiving a special prize for his performance in the television series God natt, jord.

For the first nineteen ceremonies, the eligibility period spanned two calendar years. For example, the 2nd Guldbagge Awards presented on October 15, 1965, recognized films that were released between July, 1964 and June, 1965. Starting with the 20th Guldbagge Awards, held in 1985, the period of eligibility became the full previous calendar year from January 1 to December 31. The Awards presented at that ceremony were in respect of 18 months of film production owing to the changeover from the broken calendar year to the standard calendar year during 1984. Due to a mediocre film year, no awards ceremony was held in 1971, and only the category for Best Film was awarded that year. Since that year, ceremonies were held annually.

Before 1991 the awards did not announce nominees, only winners. From 1991 and forward, SFI introduced the system of three nominations in all price categories. In 2016, the following categories has been expanded to four nominees: Best Director, Best Screenplay, Best Actress, Best Actor, Supporting Actress and Supporting Actor, while the category of Best Film has been expanded to five.

== The award ==
=== Design ===
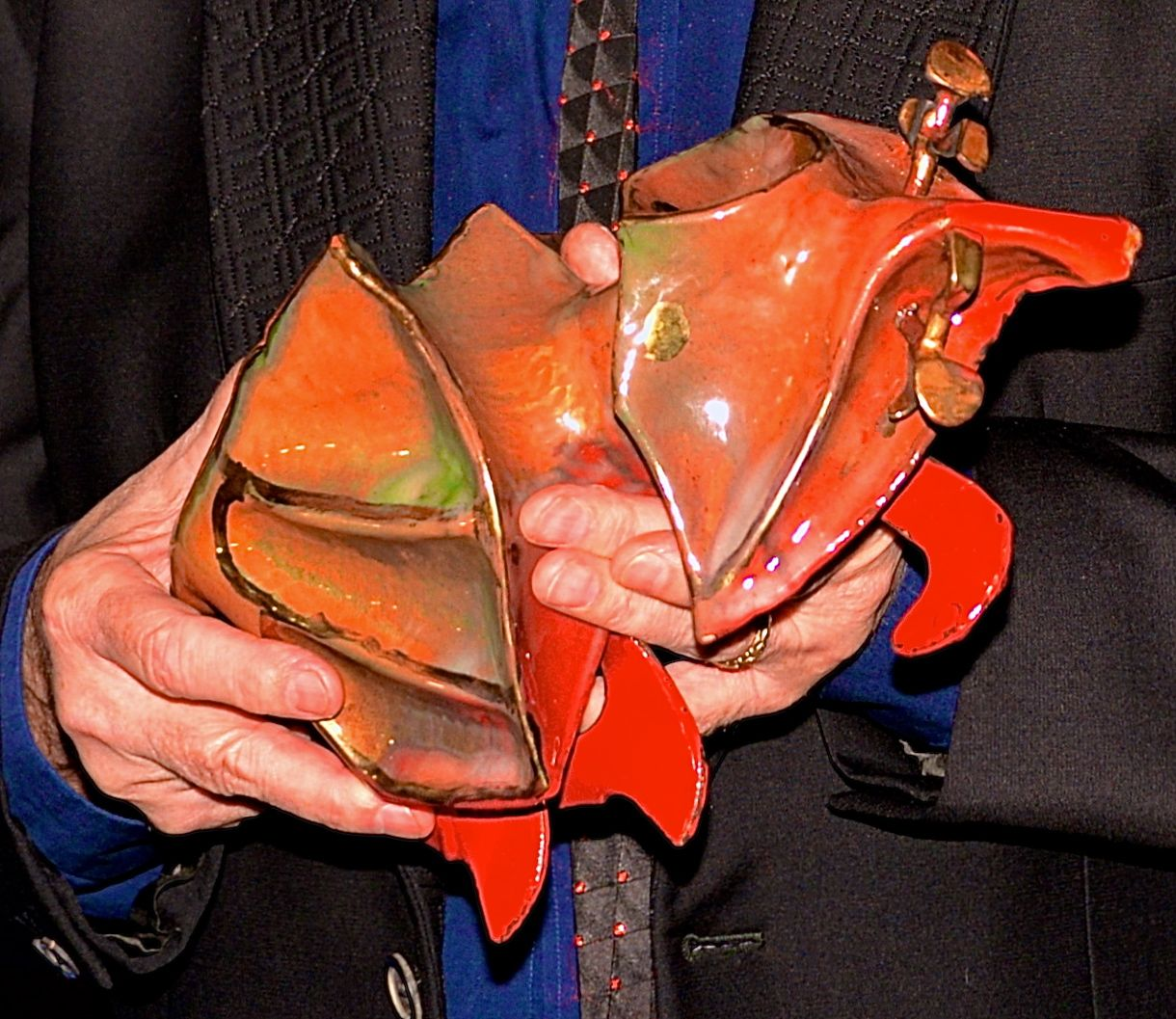
A Guldbagge from the 48th Guldbagge Awards ceremony, January 21, 2013.

The prize itself, a small statue in the shape of a beetle, is made from copper which is enamelled and gilded and weighs approximately 1.2 kg. It was designed by the artist Karl Axel Pehrson, who won a design competition, which was organized on the initiative of SFI's CEO at the time, Harry Schein. The award would then be presented to those who had made a strong contribution during the year. Exactly which artists, beside Pehrson, who took part in the competition is still wrapped in mystery.

An inscription of the name of the award's winner, and the category in question, is glued to the underside of the beetle. The following text is engraved under the abdomens of each beetle: "Guldbaggen: comic, tragic, bizarre, outstanding - as the film's contrast-rich world. Its shimmering flight - operating filmstrip". All beetles are similar and yet different and unique works of art.

=== Etymology ===
Guldbagge is the Swedish name for Cetonia aurata, a beetle also known as rose chafer. Karl Axel Pehrson gave the following description of why he chose a rose chafer beetle as his inspiration when designing the award: "The rose chafer likes to fly in the summer sunshine. It shimmers much like a film strip as it flies by. Something about its behaviour and its way of living can be likened to that of film."

== Nomination ==
=== The nominating committee ===
Which films and who should be nominated for the Guldbagge Awards different categories are determined by a nominating committee. It consists of 45 members who nominate three candidates in each category, except for the Best Foreign Film, Best Short Film and Best Documentary, which has special nominating groups. The Committee members are active in the Swedish film industry and are appointed by their respective organizations or institutions, as determined by the Swedish Film Institute's board of directors.

The members appointed are assumed to have solid experience in the professional occupation within film or documented experience in assessing cinematic expression. In appointing the members of the nominating committee seeks gender parity and level of ages. Jury members shall observe professional secrecy regarding their participation in the jury. Upon disqualification, the Jury member may be replaced.

The Swedish Film Institute's board of directors appoints the chairman, who is leading the work. The members of the nominating committee are obligated to watch all of the Swedish films that premiered at the cinema the previous year. The process repeats until there are only three candidates remain.

==== Voting ====
The members of the committee have one vote in each category, in which they indicate their first, second and third choice, respectively. The votes are then distributed after the first choice, where the choice has collected the fewest votes are discarded. These votes are later distributed to the remaining candidates, now after their second choice. Then the process starts over and the votes are counted on again and the candidate with the fewest votes is removed and distributed over their second choice.

If the second choice has already lost, then the voters' third choice are counted instead. If even this choice has fallen away, the vote is discarded completely. When everything is ready, there remains only three candidates being nominated for the award ceremony.

=== The winners jury ===
After the nomination process is completed and presented, usually in early January, a winners jury takes over. Through open discussions, the winning jury appoints the winner among the three nominees in all price categories, except for the category Special efforts, which is designated by the jury without prior nomination. The Lifetime Achievement Award is appointed by the Swedish Film Institute's board of directors. The announcement of the winners takes place during the award ceremony later in January.

The jury consists of 9 members, including the chairman. The Board of Directors appoints the jury chairman, who then along with a team from the Swedish Film Institute suggests the other eight members. The chairman has no right to vote and leads the work of the jury. Although, he or she has a casting vote in connection with the jury's decision meeting, if there is an even distribution of votes.

The members of the jury should have solid experience in the professional occupation related to film, and one of them has to come from another Nordic country. Jury members shall observe professional secrecy regarding their jury work. To secure both the renewal and continuity, a member can only participate in the jury for a maximum of four years.

== Merit categories ==
=== Current categories ===
The award is given out to the best film-related efforts in the following categories:

- Best Film: since 1964
- Best Director: since 1964
- Best Screenplay: since 1989
- Best Cinematography: since 1989
- Best Actress in a leading role: since 1964
- Best Actor in a leading role: since 1964
- Best Supporting actress: since 1996
- Best Supporting actor: since 1996
- Best Editing: since 2012
- Best Costume Design: since 2012
- Best Sound: since 2012
- Makeup and Hair: since 2012
- Best Original Score: since 2012
- Best Art Direction: since 2012
- Best Visual Effects: since 2012
- Best Foreign Film: since 1988 (In which the country of production, not the language of the film, is what makes the film a potential nominee)
- Best Short film: since 1996
- Best Documentary Feature: since 2001

=== Discontinued categories ===
The following list shows earlier awards that has been discontinued:

- The Special Achievement Award: 1964 to 1987
- Creative Achievement Award: 1988 to 1999
- Best Achievement in the professional areas of film editing, scenography, costume, makeup, special effects and animation: 2000 to 2006
- Best Achievement in the professional areas of sound technology, mixing and score composition: 2000 to 2006
- Best Achievement (three awards) for achievement in professional areas not covered by their own Guldbagge: 2007 to 2010

== Special and related categories ==
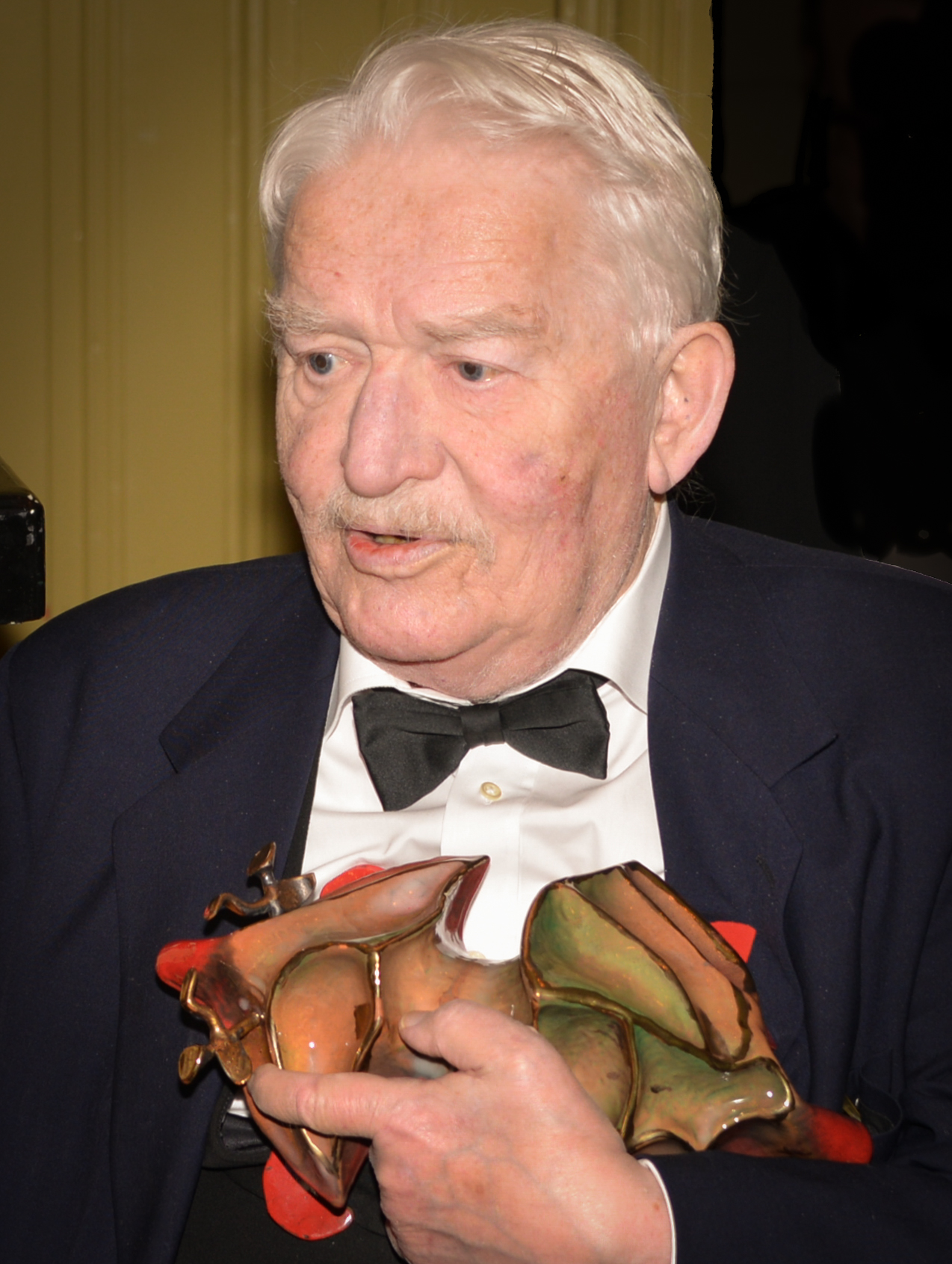
Hans Alfredson received the Lifetime Achievement Award at the 48th Guldbagge Awards.

The awards are voted on by special committees, rather than by the Nominating Committee or the Winners jury as a whole. Some of them have their own statuettes or awards.

=== Current categories ===
- Honorary Award: since 2001
- The Gullspira: since 2006 (For an individual who has made a special contribution to children's films.)
- The Audience Award: 2007 to 2011; since 2013 (The moviegoers award to the past year's best Swedish film.)

=== Discontinued categories ===
- The Ingmar Bergman Award: 1978 to 2007 (Was primarily intended to honour achievements in Swedish film which had not otherwise been considered when the Guldbagge awards were handed out.)

== Criticism ==
In early 2005, the award received some criticism, since only three of the 33 Swedish feature films that premiered in 2004 received nominations in seven main categories (film, direction, actor, actress, supporting actor, supporting actress, screenplay) and it was made public that some of the jury members had not seen all 33 films.
