= Gertrud Fridh =

Swedish actress (1921–1984)

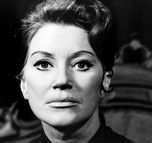
Gertrud Fridh, Hedda Gabler, 1964

Gertrud Fridh (26 November 1921 – 11 October 1984) was a Swedish stage and film actress.

== Biography ==
Born in Gothenburg, Fridh later studied acting at Gothenburg City Theatre's acting school from 1941 to 1944. She worked in the 1940s and 1950s at the city theatres in Gothenburg and Malmö. At the latter she came in contact with director Ingmar Bergman who directed her on stage and later would cast her in strong parts in some of his most memorable films, including Wild Strawberries (1957), The Magician / The Face (1958), The Devil's Eye (1960), All These Women (1964) and Hour of the Wolf (1967).

From 1956 to 1978, Gertrud Fridh was part of the ensemble at Sweden's national stage, the Royal Dramatic Theatre in Stockholm. There she performed a number of celebrated parts, from Titania in A Midsummer Night's Dream (1956) to Phaedra in Euripides' Hippolytus (1965) and The Mummy in Strindberg's The Ghost Sonata (1973). One of her most praised parts was her Hedda Gabler, in the legendary 1964 Dramaten production of the Ibsen play, directed by Bergman. The successful production gave 89 performances, and she later guest performed in Helsinki, Berlin and London. Despite the fact that many Swedish actresses have taken on the role of Hedda Gabler over the years, in Sweden, Gertrud Fridh is still regarded as the definitive Hedda of all time.

== Selected filmography ==
- A Ship to India (1947)
- Two Stories Up (1950)
- Jack of Hearts (1950)
- The White Cat (1950)
- The Yellow Squadron (1954)
- Wild Birds (1955)
- Egen ingång (1956)
- The Magician (1958)
- The Devil's Eye (1960)
- Siska (1962)
- All These Women (1964)
- Hour of the Wolf (1968)

== Awards ==
- Thaliapriset (1953)
- Eugene O'Neill Award (1966)

== Sources ==
- History of Dramaten - Dramaten.se
