= Mona Malm =

Swedish actress (1935–2021)

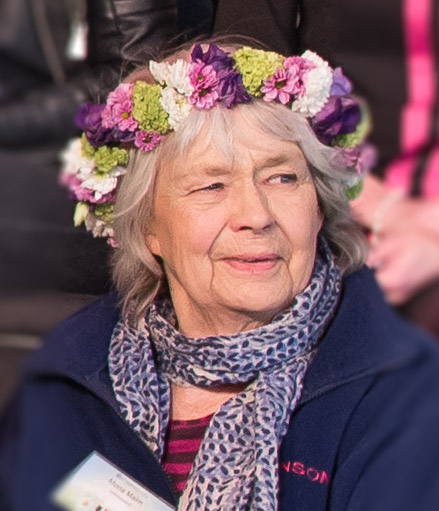
- Mona Malm in June 2015.
- Born: Mona Kristina Ericsson; 24 January 1935; Norrmalm, Stockholm, Sweden
- Died: 12 January 2021 (aged 85); Södersjukhuset, Stockholm, Sweden
- Occupation: Actress
- Years active: 1944–2021
- Spouse: Lars Wahlman (m. 1954)
- Children: 2

Mona Kristina Wahlman (24 January 1935 – 12 January 2021), better known by her stage name Mona Malm, was a Swedish film, stage, and television actress. Born in 1935 to Harald Ericsson and Inez Malmberg, she began her career with the Swedish Royal Dramatic Theater in 1957.

Malm died in hospital on 12 January 2021, at the age of 85.

== Selected filmography ==
- Love Wins Out (1949)
- Young Summer (1954)
- The Yellow Squadron (1954)
- The Girl in the Rain (1955)
- Smiles of a Summer Night (1955)
- Mother Takes a Vacation (1957)
- The Seventh Seal (1957)
- Woman in a Fur Coat (1958)
- Fridolf Stands Up! (1958)
- Rider in Blue (1959)
- Siska (1962)
- All These Women (1964)
- Nightmare (1965)
- Heja Roland! (1966)
- Det andre skiftet (1978)
- Fanny and Alexander (1982)
- Nånting levande åt Lame-Kal (1988)
- The Best Intentions (1992)
- The Tattooed Widow (1998)
- After the Wedding (2006)
