= My Sister, My Love (film) =

- Directed by: Vilgot Sjöman
- Starring: Bibi Andersson; Per Oscarsson
- Music by: Ulf Björlin
- Release date: 28 February 1966
- Running time: 97 minutes
- Country: Sweden
- Language: Swedish

My Sister, My Love (Swedish: Syskonbädd 1782) is a 1966 Swedish drama film, directed by Vilgot Sjöman.

== Cast ==
- Bibi Andersson – Charlotte
- Per Oscarsson – Jacob
- Jarl Kulle – Karl Ulrik Alsmeden
- Tina Hedström – Ebba Livin
- Gunnar Björnstrand – Count Schwartz
- Rune Lindström – Samuel Zacharias Storck

== Censorship ==
When Syskonbädd 1782 was first released in Italy in 1971 the Committee for the Theatrical Review of the Italian Ministry of Cultural Heritage and Activities rated it as VM18: not suitable for children under 18. In addition, the committee imposed the removal of the following scene: the scene in which Jacob is in bed with two naked women.

The commission stated that the movie is of great artistic value and does not allow provocative elements to emerge from the narration (which is about a pathological relationship between brother and sister). On the contrary, the movie features a good moral ending in which the female character is punished with death while giving birth to the fruit of her sinful love. Document N° 49587 signed on 28 August 1967 by Minister Adolfo Sarti.
