= Lena Nyman =

Swedish actress (1944–2011)

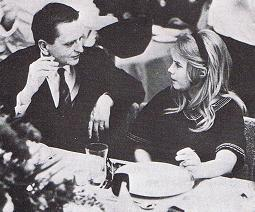
- Nyman with Olof Palme (who played himself, uncredited, in I Am Curious (Yellow)) at the 5th Guldbagge Awards (October 1968)
- Born: Anna Lena Elisabet Nyman; 23 May 1944; Stockholm, Sweden
- Died: 4 February 2011 (aged 66); Stockholm, Sweden
- Occupation: Actress
- Years active: 1955–2006
- Spouse: Rune Andersson (m. 1977–1979)

Anna Lena Elisabet Nyman (23 May 1944 – 4 February 2011) was a Swedish film and stage actress.

Having had her first film roles in 1955, Nyman had a role in Vilgot Sjöman's 491 (1964) and got her breakthrough in his I Am Curious (Yellow) (1967), where she, in pseudo-documentary fashion, played a character of the same name as herself, and its sequel I Am Curious (Blue) (1968). Nyman won the 1967–68 award for Best Actress at the 5th Guldbagge Awards.

She later participated in many of the films and stage productions of Hans Alfredson and Tage Danielsson, such as Release the Prisoners to Spring (1975) and The Adventures of Picasso (1978). Nyman co-starred with Ingrid Bergman and Liv Ullmann in Ingmar Bergman's Autumn Sonata (1978).

In 2004, Nyman received the royal medal Litteris et Artibus, and in 2006 she was the recipient of the Eugene O'Neill Award.

Nyman died on 4 February 2011, aged 66, after a long battle with several illnesses including alcoholism, pancreatic cancer, COPD from years of heavy smoking and Guillain–Barré syndrome.
