= Tomas Bolme =

Swedish actor

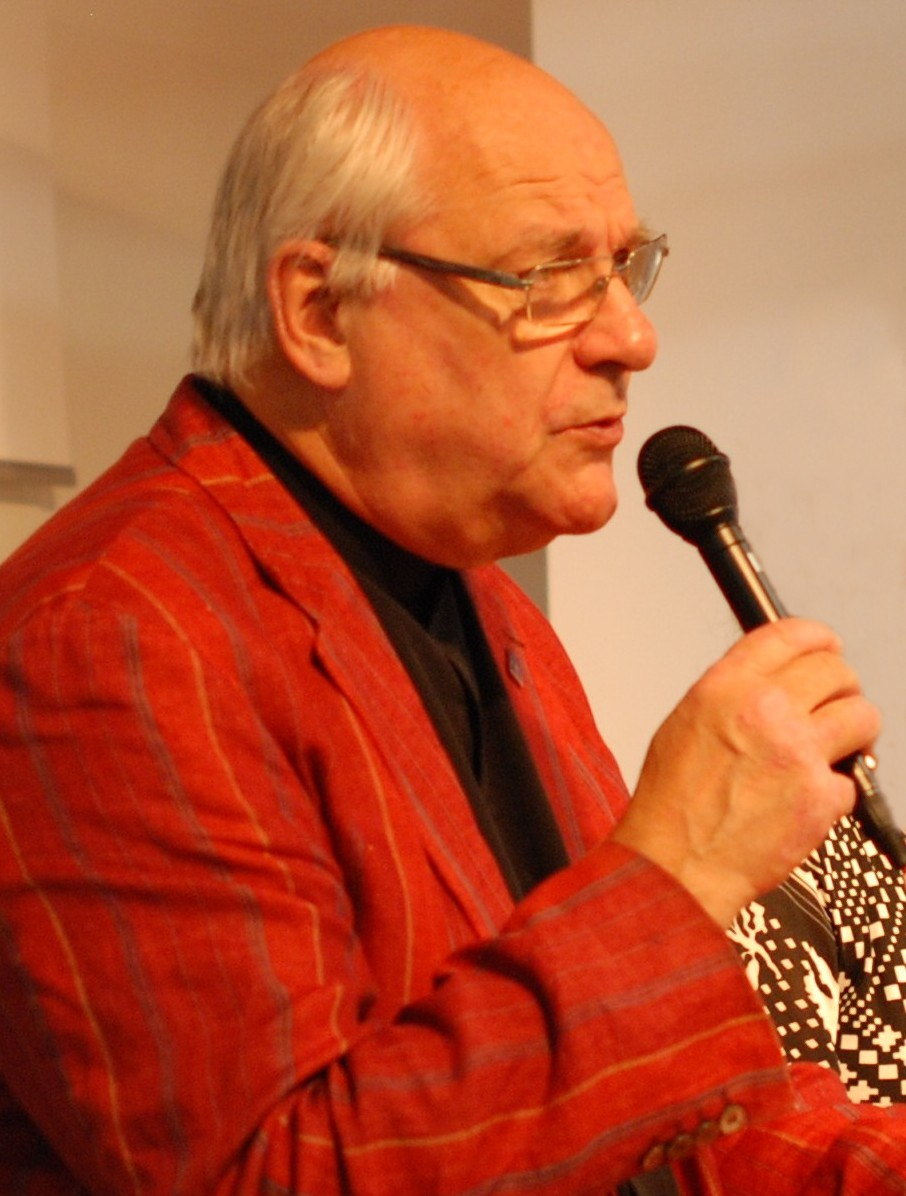
- Bolme in 2010.
- Born: Tomas Robert Olof Bolme; 21 April 1945 (age 80)
- Occupation: Actor
- Spouse: Elisabeth Nordkvist
- Relatives: Agneta Bolme Börjefors (sister)

Tomas Robert Olof Bolme (born 21 April 1945 in Högalid, Stockholm) is a Swedish actor. He is famous for being the Swedish voice of Tintin, and he is also the voice of the anime hero Cobra. As a child, he acted at Vår teater, a children's theatre in Stockholm. He studied at Teaterhögskolan in Stockholm during the years 1966 to 1969. Bolme has performed at Fria Proteatern, Royal Dramatic Theatre, Stockholm City Theatre and the National Swedish Touring Theatre. He has also recorded several audiobooks and one of them is Jan Guillou's Coq Rouge.

Bolme is a former member of the political party Communist League Marxists-Leninists (Swedish: Kommunistiska förbundet marxist-leninisterna, KFML).

He is the brother of television host Agneta Bolme Börjefors. At the 24th Guldbagge Awards he won the award for Best Actor for his role in Creditors. Along with Kim Anderzon, he co-hosted the 27th Guldbagge Awards.

== Selected filmography ==
- Pirates on the Malonen (1959)
- The Last Adventure (1974)
- Creditors (1988)

Trade union offices
Preceded by Peter Heinz Kersten	President of the International Federation of Actors; 1992–2008	Succeeded by Agnete Haaland
