= Rififi in Stockholm =

1961 film

- Directed by: Hasse Ekman
- Written by: Jan-Olof Rydqvist
- Produced by: Svensk Filmindustri
- Starring: Gunnar Hellström; Maude Adelson; Tor Isedal; Nils Hallberg
- Release date: 4 September 1961
- Running time: 92 minutes
- Country: Sweden
- Language: Swedish

Rififi in Stockholm (Swedish: Stöten) also titled Blueprint for a Million is a 1961 Swedish drama crime film directed by Hasse Ekman.

== Cast ==
- Gunnar Hellström as Erik "Jerka", robber
- Maude Adelson as Mona Hansson
- Tor Isedal as Janne, robber
- Nils Hallberg as Peter Bergefrag, robber
- Curt Masreliez as Esse, robber
- Hjördis Petterson as Mrs. Jansson
- Gunnar Nielsen as Bertil, guard
- Harry Ahlin as Snyftarn
- Eric Stolpe as Hampe, boxer
- Bengt Eklund as croupier
