= Börje Ahlstedt =

Swedish actor (born 1939)

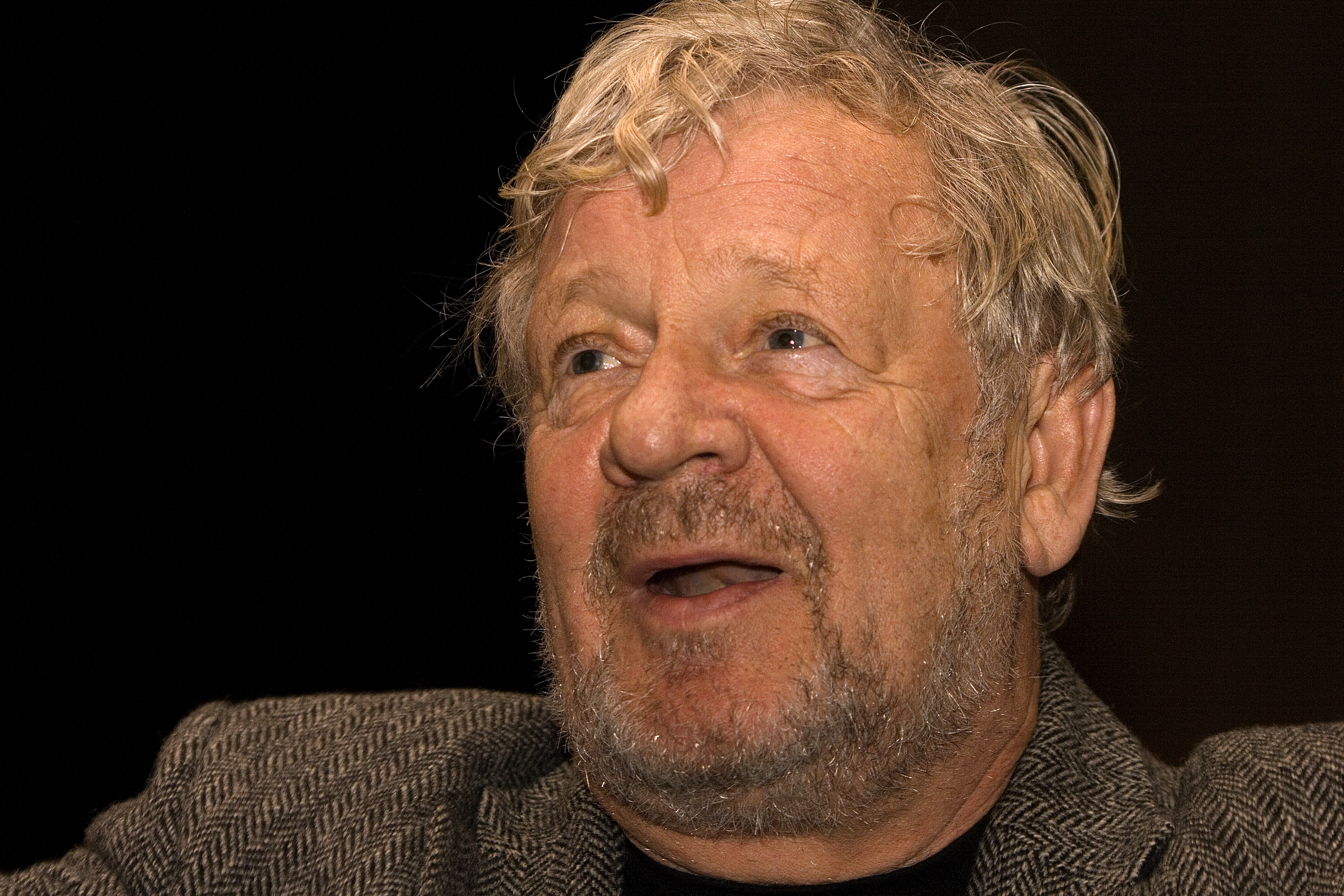
- Ahlstedt in 2008
- Born: Nils Börje Ahlstedt; 21 February 1939 (age 87); Stockholm, Sweden
- Occupation: Actor
- Years active: 1965–present
- Spouse: Birgitta Hermann (m. 1965)
- Children: 2

Nils Börje Ahlstedt (born 21 February 1939) is a Swedish actor who has worked extensively with director Ingmar Bergman in films like Fanny and Alexander (1982), The Best Intentions (1992), Sunday's Children (1992) and Saraband (2003). Ahlstedt has also worked with the directors Bo Widerberg and Kay Pollak.

== Biography ==
Nils Börje Ahlstedt was born on 21 February 1939 in Stockholm. He went to the school of the Royal Dramatic Theatre 1962–1965 and has belonged to the ensemble of the theatre since graduating.

Early in his acting career, Ahlstedt starred in the films I Am Curious (Yellow) (1967) and I Am Curious (Blue) (1968).

Ahlstedt has also been in plays and films based on the dramas written by August Strindberg as well as in films based on the children’s books by Astrid Lindgren, for instance playing the father of Ronia in Ronia the Robber's Daughter.

At the 26th Guldbagge Awards he won the award for Best Actor for his role in The Rabbit Man.

In January 2006, the American newspaper USA Today suggested that Ahlstedt should be nominated for a Best Supporting Actor Oscar for his role in Saraband, with the comment "He shows you what it's like to be an aging version of a man who was already broken in his 20s".

In 2013, Ahlstedt appears as "Pápá Fouras", the new Swedish version of "Père Fouras", in the 15th season of Fångarna på fortet (the Swedish version of French game show, Fort Boyard) on TV4. Ahlstedt is seen inside the fort's Watch Tower and sets riddles for certain contestants; if the contestants give the correct answer, they receive a key.

Ahlstedt has been married to Birgitta Hermann since 1965. They have two children.
