= Ulla-Britt Söderlund =

Swedish costume designer (1943–1985)

- Born: August 12, 1943; Växjö, Sweden
- Died: July 21, 1985 (aged 41); Copenhagen, Denmark
- Occupation: Costume designer
- Years active: 1966–1985

Ulla-Britt Söderlund (August 12, 1943 – July 21, 1985) was a Swedish costume designer, best known to international audiences for her collaborations with directors Jan Troell and Stanley Kubrick. Her film credits include Hunger (1966), The Emigrants (1971), The New Land (1972), and Barry Lyndon (1975), where the latter earned her an Academy Award.

== Career ==
Söderlund began her career creating the costumes for various Danish-Swedish screen co-productions. Her first major film credit was in Henning Carlsen's 1966 black-and-white drama Hunger, which was based on Knut Hamsun's 1890 novel of the same name. She again worked with Carlsen the following year, this time on the romantic comedy People Meet and Sweet Music Fills the Heart, which was an adaptation of Jens August Schade's 1944 novel. She then designed costumes for Mai Zetterling's 1968 dramatic adaptations, Doctor Glas and The Girls.

In the following years, Söderlund collaborated with many renowned directors, such as Gabriel Axel, Jan Troell, Stanley Kubrick, and Hans Alfredson, among others. In particular, her meticulous work on Troell's simultaneously filmed period dramas The Emigrants (1971) and The New Land (1972), garnered a great deal of attention and launched her to international prominence. Along with other career prospects, she and Milena Canonero worked together on the authentic 18th-century wardrobes for Kubrick's 1975 epic Barry Lyndon. That ambitious project required a year and a half of preparing the costumes, studying paintings, and reading books to reproduce garments for the screen. Their remarkable efforts received critical and audience admiration, ultimately winning them the Academy Award for Best Costume Design. Söderlund was the first Swedish designer ever to win in the category.

In the late 1970s, Söderlund worked on the acclaimed Danish television series Matador. Among her last notable film credits was designing the wardrobe for Alfredson's 1982 drama film, The Simple-Minded Murder.

== Filmography ==
=== Film ===
Year	Title	Director	Notes
1966	Hunger	Henning Carlsen	with Ada Skolmen
1967	Hagbard and Signe	Gabriel Axel	
1967	People Meet and Sweet Music Fills the Heart	Henning Carlsen	with Lotte Dandanell
1968	Doctor Glas	Mai Zetterling	
1968	The Girls	Mai Zetterling	
1969	Jazz All Around	Knud Leif Thomsen	with Elva Nordli
1971	The Emigrants	Jan Troell	
1971	Med kærlig hilsen	Gabriel Axel	with Elva Nordli
1971	Bedside Dentist	John Hilbard	with Elva Nordli
1972	1001 Danish Delights	Sven Methling	with Berit Mørkeberg
1972	The New Land	Jan Troell	
1975	Barry Lyndon	Stanley Kubrick	with Milena Canonero
1977	The Prince and the Pauper	Richard Fleischer	Söderlund only designed costumes for Raquel Welch
1977	The Assignment	Mats Arehn	
1981	Jeppe på bjerget	Kaspar Rostrup	with Annelise Siegstad
1982	The Simple-Minded Murderer	Hans Alfredson	
1983	Among the Cinders	Rolf Hädrich	

=== Television ===
Year	Title	Notes
1978–1979	Matador	12 episodes

== Awards and nominations ==
Award	Year (Note: Indicates the year of ceremony. Each year is linked to the article about the awards held that year, wherever possible.)	Category	Work	Result	Ref.
Academy Awards	1976	Best Costume Design	Barry Lyndon	Won	
British Academy Film Awards	1976	Best Costume Design	Barry Lyndon	Nominated	

== Illness and death ==
Söderlund died of cancer on 21 July 1985. She was diagnosed with the disease in the spring of that year.

== See also ==
- List of Nordic Academy Award winners and nominees
