= List of film awards =

This is a list of groups, organizations, and festivals that recognize achievements in cinema, usually by awarding various prizes. The awards sometimes also have popular unofficial names (such as the "Oscar" for Hollywood's Academy Awards), which are mentioned if applicable. Many awards are simply identified by the name of the group presenting the award.

Awards have been divided into four major categories: critics' awards, voted on (usually annually) by a group of critics; festival awards, awards presented to the best film shown in a particular film festival; industry awards, which are selected by professionals working in some branch of the film industry; and audience awards, which are voted by the general public.

== Critics' awards ==
=== International ===
- FIPRESCI (Fédération Internationale de la PRESse CInématographique) Awards (given by the international Film Critics at various film festivals)
- African Federation of Film Critics (FACC): Paulin Soumanou Vieyra Awards at various African film festivals
- Golden Globes (given by the Golden Globe Foundation)
- Online Film Critics Society

=== Argentina ===
- Asociación de Cronistas Cinematográficos de la Argentina
  - Premios Cóndor de Plata
- Premios Clarín Espectáculos
- Konex Awards

=== Australia ===
- ATOM Awards
- Australian Film Critics Association (AFCA)
- AWGIE Awards (AWG)
- Film Critics Circle of Australia (FCCA)
- Inside Film Awards (IF Awards)
- South Australian Screen Awards
- Western Union Short Film Competition

=== Bangladesh ===
- Meril Prothom Alo Awards
- National Film Awards

=== Belgium ===
- Belgian Film Critics Association (UCC)

=== Brazil ===
- Festival de Gramado
- Grande Prêmio do Cinema Brasileiro
- Campinas Film Festival

=== Canada ===
- Association québécoise des critiques de cinéma (AQCC)
- Toronto Film Critics Association (TFCA)
- Vancouver Film Critics Circle (VFCC)

=== Czech Republic ===
- Czech Film Critics' Awards
- Trilobit Awards

=== Denmark ===
- Bodil Awards from Danish Film Critics Association
- Lauritzen Awards

=== France ===
- Etoiles du Parisien
- French Syndicate of Cinema Critics
- Globes de Cristal Awards
- Louis Delluc Prize
- Paris Film Critics Association Awards

=== Germany ===
- Award of the German Film Critics Association (German: Preis der deutschen Filmkritik)

=== Hong Kong ===
- Hong Kong Film Critics Society Awards

=== India ===
- Ahmedabad International Film Festival
- Aravindan Puraskaram
- Asianet Film Awards
- Bengal Film Journalists' Association Awards
- Bhojpuri Film Awards
- CineMAA Awards
- Cinema Express Awards
- Edison Tamil Awards
- Dadasaheb Phalke Award
- Filmfare Awards
- Filmfare Awards East
- Filmfare Awards South
- Filmfare Marathi Awards
- Filmfare Short Film Awards
- IIFA Utsavam
- International Indian Film Academy Awards
- John Abraham Awards
- Karnataka State Film Awards
- Kerala Film Critics Association Awards
- Kerala State Film Awards
- Maharashtra State Film Awards
- Nandi Awards
- National Film Awards (Directorate of Film Festivals)
- Odisha State Film Awards
- Padmarajan Awards
- Prag Cine Awards
- Rajasthan Film Festival
- RED FM Tulu Film Awards
- Santosham Film Awards
- SIIMA Short Film Awards
- Screen Awards
- South Indian International Movie Awards
- Stardust Awards
- Tamil Nadu State Film Awards
- Udaya Film Awards
- Vanitha Film Awards
- Vijay Awards
- West Bengal Film Journalists' Association Awards
- Zee Cine Awards
- Zee Cine Awards Telugu

=== Indonesia ===
- Citra Awards
- Maya Awards
- Film Pilihan Tempo
- Festival Film Bandung

=== Ireland ===
- Dublin Film Critics' Circle
- IFTA Film & Drama Awards

=== Italy ===
- Nastro d'Argento
- Globo d'oro
- David di Donatello

=== Japan ===
- Japanese Movie Critics Awards

=== Lebanon ===
- The Lebanese Cinema Movie Guide Awards

=== Mexico ===
- Ariel Awards
- Diosas de Plata

=== Myanmar ===
- Myanmar Motion Picture Academy Awards

=== Malaysia ===
- Kuala Lumpur Film Critics Council Awards (Malay: Anugerah Majlis Pengkritik Filem Kuala Lumpur)

=== Nigeria ===
- Africa Magic Viewers' Choice Awards
- Africa Movie Academy Awards

=== Pakistan ===
- ARY Film Awards
- Lux style awards
- PTV Awards
- Nigar awards
- Pakistan International Screen Awards
- Hum Awards

=== Philippines ===
- Box Office Entertainment Awards
- The Entertainment Editors' Choice Awards
- FAMAS Awards
- Film Festivals
  - CineFilipino Film Festival
  - Cinemalaya Philippine Independent Film Festival
  - Metro Manila Film Festival
    - Manila International Film Festival (International counterpart)
  - QCinema International Film Festival
  - Singkuwento International Film Festival
  - Sinag Maynila Film Festival
  - Urduja Film Festival
- Gawad PASADO
- Gawad Genio Awards
- Gawad TANGLAW
- Gawad Urian
- Golden Screen Movie Awards
- Luna Award Film Academy of the Philippines (FAP) or Luna Awards
- PMPC Star Awards for Movies
- Society of Filipino Film Reviewers
- Young Critics Circle Film Desk Awards

=== Portugal ===
- Golden Globes (Portugal)

=== Puerto Rico ===
- Puerto Rico Critics Association

=== South Africa ===
- National Film and TV Awards (NFTA) South Africa

=== South Korea ===
- Korean Association of Film Critics Awards
- Busan Film Critics Awards

=== Spain ===
- CEC Medals
- Feroz Awards
- Fotogramas de Plata
- Sant Jordi Awards

=== Turkey ===
- SIYAD Awards of Turkish Film Critics Association (SİYAD)
- Flying Broom International Women's Film Festival (Uçan Süpürge Kadın Filmleri Festivali)
- International Adana Golden Boll Film Festival (Adana Altın Koza Film Festivali)
- International Adana Film Festival (Uluslararası Adana Film Festivali)
- Istanbul Animation Festival (İstanbul Animasyon Festivali)

=== United Kingdom ===
- ODEON National Youth Film Awards
- National Film Awards UK
- Evening Standard British Film Awards
- London Film Critics' Circle
- National Movie Awards
- Film Critics Association UK
- Charity Film Awards

=== United States ===
- African-American Film Critics Association (AAFCA)
- Alliance of Women Film Journalists (EDA Awards)
- American Film Institute Awards (AFI)
- Atlanta Film Critics Circle (AFCC)
- Austin Film Critics Association (AFCA)
- Black Film Critics Circle (BFCC)
- Boston Online Film Critics Association (BOFCA)
- Boston Society of Film Critics (BSFC)
- Critics Choice Association (CCA; formerly the Broadcast Film Critics Association)
  - Critics' Choice Awards
  - Critics' Choice Super Awards
- Chicago Film Critics Association (CFCA)
- Chicago Indie Critics (CIC)
- Columbus Film Critics Association (CFCA)
- Critics Association of Central Florida (CACF)
- Dallas–Fort Worth Film Critics Association (DFWFCA)
- Denver Film Critics Society (DFCS)
- Detroit Film Critics Society (DFCS)
- DiscussingFilm Critic Awards (DFCA)
- Dorian Awards (GALECA: The Society of LGBTQ Entertainment Critics)
- Florida Film Critics Circle (FFCC)
- Georgia Film Critics Association (GFCA)
- Golden Raspberry Awards (The Razzies)
- Greater Western New York Film Critics Association (GWNYFCA)
- Hawaii Film Critics Society (HFCS)
- Houston Film Critics Society (HFCS)
- Indiana Film Journalists Association (IFJA)
- IndieWire Critics Poll
- Iowa Film Critics Association (IFCA)
- Kansas City Film Critics Circle (KCFCC)
- Las Vegas Film Critics Society (LVFCS)
- Latino Entertainment Journalists Association (LEJA)
- Los Angeles Film Critics Association (LAFCA)
- Michigan Movie Critics Guild (MMCG)
- Midnight Critics Circle (MCC)
- Minnesota Film Critics Association (MNFCA)
- Music City Film Critics Association (MCFCA)
- National Film and TV Awards USA (NFTA)
- National Society of Film Critics (NSFC)
- National Board of Review (NBR)
- Nevada Film Critics Society (NFCS)
- New Jersey Film Critics Circle (NJFCC)
- New York Film Critics Circle (NYFCC)
- New York Film Critics Online (NYFCO)
- New York Film Awards (NYFA)
- Nollywood and African Film Critics Awards (NAFCA)
- North Carolina Film Critics Association (NCFCA)
- North Dakota Film Society (NDFS)
- North Texas Film Critics Association (NTFCA)
- Oklahoma Film Critics Circle (OFCC)
- Online Association of Female Film Critics (OAFFC)
- Online Film Critics Society (OFCS)
- Online Film & Television Association (OFTA)
- Philadelphia Film Critics Circle (PFCC)
- Phoenix Critics Circle (PCC)
- Phoenix Film Critics Society (PFCS)
- Pittsburgh Film Critics Association (PFCA)
- Political Film Society (PFS)
- Portland Critics Association (PCA)
- Puerto Rico Critics Association (PRCA)
- San Diego Film Critics Society (SDFCS)
- San Francisco Bay Area Film Critics Circle (SFBAFCC)
- Seattle Film Critics Society (SFCS)
- Silver Spur Awards (RC)
- Southeastern Film Critics Association (SEFCA)
- St. Louis Film Critics Association (StLFCA)
- Stinkers Bad Movie Awards (formerly the Hastings Bad Cinema Society)
- Utah Film Critics Association (UFCA)
- Village Voice Film Poll
- Washington D.C. Area Film Critics Association (WAFCA)
- Women Film Critics Circle (WFCC)
- X-Rated Critics Organization (XRCO) Heart-On Awards

=== Uruguay ===
- Uruguayan Film Critics Association Awards 2002

=== Vietnam ===
- HCMC International Film Festival (HIFF)

== Significant Festival awards ==
As of 1998, The Variety Guide to Film Festivals states that "the Triple Crown of international competitive festivals" are Cannes, Venice and Berlin.

=== Argentina ===
- Festival Internacional de Cine de Mar del Plata
- BAFICI (Buenos Aires Festival Internacional de Cine Independiente)

=== Armenia ===
- Golden Apricot Yerevan International Film Festival

=== Australia ===
- Flickerfest

=== Bangladesh ===
- Dhaka International Film Festival

=== Belgium ===
- Flanders International Film Festival Ghent

=== Bosnia and Herzegovina ===
- Sarajevo Film Festival
  - Heart of Sarajevo
- Sarajevo Youth Film Festival

=== Brazil ===
- Grande Prêmio do Cinema Brasileiro
- São Paulo International Film Festival
- Campinas Film Festival

=== Burkina Faso ===
- Panafrican Film and Television Festival of Ouagadougou (FESPACO)

=== Canada ===
- Atlantic International Film Festival
- Cinéfest Sudbury International Film Festival
- Festival du nouveau cinéma
- Hot Docs Canadian International Documentary Festival
- Inside Out Film and Video Festival
- Montreal World Film Festival
- Toronto International Film Festival
- Vancouver International Film Festival
- Whistler Film Festival
- Yorkton Film Festival

=== China ===
- Shanghai International Film Festival
- Beijing International Film Festival

=== Croatia ===
- Motovun Film Festival
- Pula Film Festival
- ZagrebDox

=== Czech Republic ===
- Karlovy Vary International Film Festival
  - Crystal Globe (Best Picture)
  - Special Jury Prize

=== Egypt ===
- Cairo International Film Festival
  - Golden Pyramid Awards (Best Picture)
- Luxor African Film Festival
- Aswan International Women's Film Festival
- Alexandria International Film Festival
- El Gouna Film Festival

=== France ===
- Cannes International Film Festival
  - Palme d'Or (Best Picture)
  - Grand Prize (Best Picture runner-up)
  - Jury Prize
  - Prize Un Certain Regard
  - Caméra d'Or (Best First Picture)
  - François Chalais Prize
  - Trophée Chopard
  - Vulcan Awards

=== Germany ===
- Berlin International Film Festival (Berlinale)
  - Golden Bear (Best Picture)
  - Silver Bear (Jury Grand Prize, Director, Actor, and Actress)
- Findling Awards (German: Findlingspreis)

=== Greece ===
- International Thessaloniki Film Festival
  - Golden Alexander (Best Picture)

=== Hungary ===
- Hungarian Film and TV Awards

=== India ===
- International Film Festival of India
  - Golden Peacock for Best Film
  - Golden Peacock for Best Short Film
  - Silver Peacock for Best Film
  - IFFI Best Director Award
  - IFFI Best Actor Award (Male)
  - IFFI Best Actor Award (Female)
  - IFFI ICFT UNESCO Gandhi Medal
  - IFFI Satyajit Ray Lifetime Achievement Award
  - IFFI Indian Film Personality of the Year Award
- International Film Festival of Kerala
  - Golden Crow Pheasant
- Mumbai International Film Festival
  - Golden Conch (Best Fiction and Best Documentary)

=== Indonesia ===
- Bali International Film Festival
- Bandung Film Festival
- Indonesian Film Festival
- Jakarta International Film Festival
- Jogja-NETPAC Asian Film Festival

=== Iran ===
- Fajr International Film Festival
- Hafez Awards

=== Italy ===
- Venice International Film Festival
  - Golden Lion (Best Picture)
  - Coppa Volpi (Best Actor and Actress)
- Rome Film Festival
- Capri Hollywood International Film Festival
- Ischia International Film & Music Festival
- Taormina Film Fest
- Giffoni Film Festival

=== Japan ===
- Tokyo International Film Festival

=== Morocco ===
- International Film Festival of Marrakech

=== Malaysia ===
- Malaysia Film Festival
- ASEAN International Film Festival and Awards

=== Netherlands ===
- Cinekid Festival
- Film by the Sea
- Netherlands Film Festival
- Rembrandt Awards
- SCENECS International Debut Film Festival
- ShortCutz Amsterdam

=== Nigeria ===
- Africa International Film Festival (AFRIFF)

=== Norway ===
- Norwegian International Film Festival
  - Amanda (various categories)
- Tromsø International Film Festival

=== Pakistan ===
- Kara Film Festival

=== Poland ===
- Gdynia Film Festival
- Polish Film Academy
- International Film Festival of the Art of Cinematography CAMERIMAGE

=== Portugal ===
- Fantasporto

=== Philippines ===
- Cinemanila International Film Festival
- Cinemalaya Philippine Independent Film Festival
- Cinema One Originals Film Festival
- Metro Manila Film Festival

=== Russia ===
- Moscow International Film Festival

=== South Korea ===
- Bucheon International Fantastic Film Festival
- Busan International Film Festival
- Seoul Independent Film Festival
- Seoul International Film Festival

=== Spain ===
- Málaga Spanish Film Festival ('Biznaga')
- San Sebastián International Film Festival ('Shell')
- Seville European Film Festival ('Giraldillo')
- Sitges International Fantastic Film Festival of Catalonia
- Valladolid International Film Festival ('Spike')

=== Sweden ===
- Göteborg Film Festival
- Stockholm International Film Festival

=== Switzerland ===
- Locarno International Film Festival
  - Vision Awards
- Neuchâtel International Fantastic Film Festival

=== Turkey ===
- Adana International Film Festival
- Antalya Film Festival
- Istanbul Animation Festival
- Istanbul Film Festival

=== Ukraine ===
- Odesa International Film Festival

=== United Kingdom ===
- Aesthetica Film Festival
- BFI London Film Festival
- Cambridge Film Festival
- Edinburgh International Film Festival
- Leeds International Film Festival
- Manchester Film Festival
- New Renaissance Film Festival
- Norwich Film Festival
- Raindance Film Festival
- Sheffield Doc/Fest
- UK Film Festival

=== United States ===
- Chicago International Film Festival
- Sundance Film Festival
- Hawaii International Film Festival
  - Vilcek New American Filmmakers Awards
- Seattle International Film Festival
  - Golden Space Needle (Best Picture)
- Slamdance Film Festival

=== Vietnam ===
- Hanoi International Film Festival
- Vietnam Film Festival
  - Golden Lotus (for Best Picture)

== Industry awards ==
=== International ===
- Academy Awards (popularly known as the Oscars, given by Academy of Motion Picture Arts and Sciences)
- IDA (International Documentary Association) Awards
- Location Managers Guild Awards
- Taurus World Stunt Awards
- Webby Awards
- World Soundtrack Awards

=== Argentina ===
- AACCA (Academia de las Artes y Ciencias Cinematográficas de la Argentina)
  - Premios Sur

=== Australia ===
- AACTA Awards (Australian Academy of Cinema and Television Arts Awards), replaced the AFI Awards (Australian Film Institute Awards)
- Asia Pacific Screen Awards
- Australian Production Design Guild
- Australian Screen Sound Guild
- AWGIE Awards
- Casting Guild of Australia (CGA)
- TV Week Logie Awards

=== Austria ===
- Austrian Film Awards

=== Bangladesh ===
- National Film Awards (Bangladesh)
- Meril Prothom Alo Awards

=== Belgium ===
- Joseph Plateau Awards
- Magritte Awards
- Ensor Awards

=== Canada ===
- Academy of Canadian Cinema and Television
  - Bijou Awards (1981)
  - Canadian Film Awards (1949-1978)
  - Canadian Screen Awards (since 2012)
  - Genie Awards (1980-2012)
- Alberta Film and Television Awards
- Canadian Society of Cinematographers
- Directors Guild of Canada
- Feminist Porn Awards
- Leo Awards
- Prix Iris

=== Denmark ===
- Robert Awards

=== Estonia ===
- Estonian Film and Television Awards

=== Europe ===
- European Film Academy
  - European Film Awards (formerly the Felix)
- Lux Prize (European Parliament LUX Award)

=== Finland ===
- Jussi Awards

=== France ===
- César Awards
- Lumière Awards
- Lumière Awards (Lumière Festival)
- Prix Jean Vigo
- Prix Romy Schneider
- Prix Suzanne Bianchetti
- René Clair Awards

=== Germany ===
- Bavarian Film Awards (German: Bayerischer Filmpreis)
- German Film Awards (German: Deutscher Filmpreis)

=== Hong Kong ===
- Asian Film Awards
- Golden Bauhinia Awards
- Hong Kong Film Awards

=== Ibero-America ===
- Platino Awards
- Fénix Awards

=== India ===
- Filmfare Awards
- Filmfare Awards South
- IIFA Awards
- IIFA Utsavam
- Maharashtra State Film Awards
- National Film Awards
- Nandi Awards (Andhra Pradesh State Film, Music, Television and Arts Awards)
- Star Screen Awards
- South Indian International Movie Awards
- Zee Cine Awards
- Zee Cine Awards Telugu

=== Indonesia ===
- Citra Awards
- Indonesian Movie Actors Awards
- Maya Awards
- Festival Film Bandung

=== Ireland ===
- IFTA Film & Drama Awards

=== Israel ===
- Israeli Academy of Film and Television
  - Ophir Awards

=== Italy ===
- David di Donatello Awards

=== Japan ===
- Blue Ribbon Awards
- Hochi Film Awards
- Japan Academy Prize
- Mainichi Film Awards
- Nikkan Sports Film Awards

=== Latvia ===
- 2Annas
- Lielais Kristaps
- Riga International Film Festival

=== Lithuania ===
- Sidabrinė gervė

=== Mexico ===
- Ariel Awards

=== Malaysia ===
- Screen Awards (Malay: Anugerah Skrin)

=== Nigeria ===
- Africa Movie Academy Awards, popularly known as AMAA and the AMA Awards
- Nollywood Movies Network
  - Nollywood Movies Awards (NMA)
- Best of Nollywood Awards (BON)

=== Pakistan ===
- Lux Style Awards
- Hum Awards
- ARY Film Awards

=== Philippines ===
- FAMAS Awards
- Film Academy of the Philippines
- Luna Awards
- Star Awards for Movies

=== Poland ===
- Polish Film Awards

=== Portugal ===
- Sophia Awards

=== Romania ===
- Gopo Awards

=== Russia ===
- Nika Awards
- Golden Eagle Awards
- Russian National Movie Awards

=== South Africa ===
- South African Film and Television Awards (SAFTA)

=== South Korea ===
- Blue Dragon Film Awards
- Buil Film Awards
- Chunsa Film Art Awards
- Director's Cut Awards
- Grand Bell Awards
- Baeksang Arts Awards
- Wildflower Film Awards

=== Spain ===
- Actors and Actresses Union Awards
- Berlanga Awards
- Carmen Awards
- Forqué Awards
- Gaudí Awards
- Goya Awards
- Mestre Mateo Awards

=== Sweden ===
- Guldbagge Awards

=== Switzerland ===
- Prix de Soleure
- Swiss Film Awards

=== Taiwan ===
- Golden Horse Awards
- Taipei Film Awards

=== Thailand ===
- Suphannahong National Film Awards

=== Turkey ===
- Yeşilçam Awards

=== United Kingdom ===
- British Academy of Film and Television Arts (BAFTA)
  - British Academy Film Awards
- British Independent Film Awards

=== United States ===
- Academy of Motion Picture Arts and Sciences
  - Academy Awards (popularly known as the Oscars)
- Academy of Science Fiction, Fantasy and Horror Films
  - Saturn Awards
- Actor Awards (formerly the Screen Actors Guild Awards)
- Advanced Imaging Society
  - Lumiere Awards
- American Choreography Awards
- American Cinema Editors
  - Eddie Awards
- American Society of Cinematographers Awards
- Art Directors Guild
  - Excellence in Production Design Awards
- ASCAP (American Society of Composers, Authors, and Publishers) Film and Television Awards
- ASIFA-Hollywood / International Animated Film Society
  - Annie Awards
- AVN (Adult Video News) Awards
  - GayVN Awards
- BMI Film Music Awards
- Cinema Audio Society Awards
- Costume Designers Guild Awards
- Directors Guild of America Awards
- Film Independent Spirit Awards
- Film Your Issue College Film Awards
- Golden Globes
- The Gotham Film & Media Institute
  - Gotham Awards
- Hollywood Creative Alliance (formerly the Los Angeles Online Film Critics Society and the Hollywood Critics Association)
  - Astra TV Awards
  - Astra Film Awards
  - Astra Podcast Awards
  - Astra Creative Arts Awards
  - Astra Midseason Movie Awards
- Hollywood Film Awards
- The Hollywood Reporter Key Art Awards
- Imagen Awards
- International Online Cinema Awards
- International Press Academy
  - Satellite Awards
- JEIFA Awards
- Make-Up Artists & Hair Stylists Guild Awards
- Motion Picture Sound Editors
  - Golden Reel Awards
- NAACP
  - Image Awards
- Producers Guild of America Awards
- ShoWest/National Association of Theatre Owners Convention
- Taurus World Stunt Awards
- Visual Effects Society Awards
- Writers Guild of America East / Writers Guild of America West
  - Writers Guild of America Awards
- Young Artist Awards

=== Ukraine ===
- Oleksandr Dovzhenko State Prize

=== Vietnam ===
- Kite Awards

== Audience awards ==
=== International ===
- Webby People's Voice Awards

=== Austria ===
- Romy Awards

=== Bangladesh ===
- Meril Prothom Alo Awards

=== Canada ===
- Constellation Awards

=== Germany ===
- Jupiter Award

=== India ===
- Filmfare Awards
- Filmfare Awards South
- Vijay Awards
- South Indian International Movie Awards
- Santosham Film Awards

=== Indonesia ===
- MTV Indonesia Movie Awards
- Indonesian Box Office Movie Awards
- Indonesian Choice Awards
- Indonesian Movie Actors Awards

=== Malaysia ===
- Popular Star Awards (Malay: Anugerah Bintang Popular)
- MeleTOP Era Awards
- Blockbuster Awards
- Shout! Awards

=== Nigeria ===
- Africa Magic Viewers' Choice Awards

=== Pakistan ===
- Lux Style Awards

=== Poland ===
- Polish Academy Audience Award

=== Spain ===
- GoldSpirit Awards (Soundtracks and film music)

=== United Kingdom ===
- Empire Awards
- ITV
  - National Film Awards UK
  - Audience Award for Most Popular Show (retired)
- Public Health Film Festival Audience Award
- SHAFTA Awards

=== United States ===
- Fangoria Chainsaw Awards
- MTV Movie & TV Awards
- Independent Lens Audience Award
- Kids' Choice Awards (includes both film and other media awards)
- Teen Choice Awards (includes both film and other media awards)
- People's Choice Awards (includes both film and other media awards)

== See also ==
- Lists of films
- List of film festivals
- List of television awards
- List of film acting awards
- List of film awards for lead actor
- List of pornographic film awards
- List of awards for supporting actor
- List of film awards for lead actress
- List of screenwriting awards for film
