= Gabold =

Gabold is a surname. Notable people with the surname include:

- Anne-Lise Gabold (born 1941), Danish actress, director, and teacher
- Ingolf Gabold (1942–2025), Danish composer and television producer
