= Elckerlyc (film) =

- Theatrical release poster
- Directed by: Jos Stelling
- Screenplay by: Jos Stelling
- Based on: Elckerlyc
- Produced by: Jos Stelling
- Cinematography: Ernest Bresser
- Edited by: Ate de Jong
- Music by: Ruud Bos
- Distributed by: Tuschinski Film Distribution
- Release date: 18 December 1975
- Running time: 94 minutes
- Country: Netherlands
- Language: Dutch

Elckerlyc is a 1975 Dutch drama film directed by Jos Stelling and starring George Bruens. It is also known as Elckerlijc and Elkerlyc. It tells the story of a criminal who falls in love with a girl in medieval times. The film is loosely based on the 15th-century morality play with the same title. Like in Stellings's previous film, Mariken van Nieumeghen, most of the actors are non-professionals. The film was released in Dutch cinemas on 18 December 1975.

== Cast ==
- George Bruens
- Gerard de Vos
- Henk Douze
- Bob Kars
- Johanna Leeuwenstein
- Lucie Singeling
- Frans Stelling
- Geert Thijssens
- Jan van der Steen
- Ruud van Rekum
- Nel de Vries
- Guus Westerman
