= Laurens van Rooyen =

Dutch pianist and composer (1935–2024)

- Born: Laurens Johannes van Rooyen; 27 March 1935; Utrecht, Netherlands
- Died: 21 March 2024 (aged 88) Breukelen, Netherlands
- Genres: Classical, light music, film score, easy listening
- Occupations: Pianist, composer
- Instrument: piano
- Years active: 1976–2024
- Website: http://www.laurensvanrooyen.com, on IMDb

Laurens van Rooyen (27 March 1935 – 21 March 2024) was a Dutch pianist and composer. He was known for his cooperation in the theater with Herman van Veen. He composed many pieces for the piano and wrote the score for several Dutch films. He wrote two books on his experiences as a musician.

== Biography ==
Laurens Johannes van Rooyen was born in Utrecht, Netherlands, as the oldest son of a grocer. After grammar school he studied at the Utrecht Conservatory of Music, where he met with Herman van Veen. With him he founded in 1966 the Harlekijn Muziektheater. They wrote songs and performed together.

In 1976 he released his first solo album: Kaleidoskoop. Ever since he continued to publish records with various record companies. At the end of the seventies he composed the score for Jos Stelling's Rembrandt fecit 1669, followed by Een vrouw als Eva (A Woman Like Eve), 1979, Lieve jongens (Dear Boys), 1980 and Een vlucht Regenwulpen (A Flight of Rainbirds), 1981. In the nineties he was also involved in the production of several Dutch films.

In 1978 Van Rooyen toured the Netherlands and Belgium, with musicians like guitarist Jan Akkerman. Together with Louis van Dijk, Tonny Eyk, Pim Jacobs, Pieter van Vollenhoven and Daniel Wayenberg he established in 1988 a companionship by the name of de Gevleugelde Vrienden (Winged Friends. 'Vleugel' meaning Wing as well as Grand Piano). They gave more than forty-five concerts throughout the Netherlands.

From the turn of the century Van Rooyen gave frequently piano recitals in the castles and coach houses along the river Vecht. He also performed for special occasions as anniversaries and jubilees. In 2004 he was commissioned a composition for the occasion of the 750th anniversary of the Cathedral of Utrecht. He also toured the theaters with De Verdwenen Minnares (The Lost Mistress), 2005, a musical ode to romance. Together with Geert Huinink he composed the Dance Opera Orfeo. This premiered at the opening of the Amsterdam Dance Event in 2005. Van Rooyen was the author of two books. In 2015 his most recent: Beethoven was ook een zzp'er (Beethoven was a freelancer, too).

Van Rooyen died on 21 March 2024, at the age of 88, six days shy of his 89th birthday.

== Honours and awards ==
In 1983 Van Rooyen was awarded the Golden Harp by Buma Culture Foundation. In 2014, Laurens van Rooyen received a royal decoration: Knight in the Order of the Netherlands Lion.

== Discography ==
=== Europe (releases 1976-2016) ===
Album	Year	Label
Kaleidoskoop	1976	CBS
Muziek Van Hollandse Meesters Uit De Tijd Van Rembrandt (original Motion Picture Soundtrack)	1977	CBS
Laurens van Rooyen & Scarlatti	1977	CBS
Mysteries	1978	CBS
Silly Symphony	1979	CBS
Collage	1980	Philips
Flowers For A Lady	1981	Philips
Een Vlucht Regenwulpen	1981	Philips
Misty: A Romantic Piano Concerto	1982	CBS
Just A Simple Lovesong	1983	Philips
Brandende Liefde	1983	Philips
Falling In Love	1984	Philips
Songs For Piano	1984	Philips
Portrait	1985	CBS
Golden Highlights Vol. 23	1985	CBS
Bordeaux Suite	1988	Rêverie Records
Serenata	1989	Mercury
From Laurens With Love	1990	Mercury
Visage	1992	Mercury
Rêverie 2	1994	Columbia
Traveller	1995	Columbia
Affair Play	1995	Columbia
Dichter Bij Water	1997	Oreade Music
Serengeti Symphony	1998	SOM
The Piano	2001	SIL
The Romantic Piano	2011	SIL
Pianoconcert in C groot	2011	SIL

=== Japan (releases 2011-2016) ===
Album	Year	Label
Rêverie	2011	Victor Entertainment JVC Tokyo
As You Like It	2015	Victor Entertainment JVC Tokyo
My Green Planet	2016	Victor Entertainment JVC Tokyo

=== South-Korea ===
Album	Year	Label
As You Like It	2015	Musicmine Records Seoul
Green Valley	2015	Musicmine Records Seoul
In A Classical Mood	2015	Musicmine Records Seoul
Love Songs In Spring	2015	Musicmine Records Seoul
My Favourite Filmthemes	2015	Musicmine Records Seoul
Mysterious Songs	2015	Musicmine Records Seoul
Pianoconcert in C Major	2015	Musicmine Records Seoul
Rembrandt, film music about the life of the great Dutch painter of the Golden Age	2015	Musicmine Records Seoul
Rêverie	2015	Musicmine Records Seoul
Scarlatti And Friends	2015	Musicmine Records Seoul
Stella Maris	2015	Musicmine Records Seoul
Symphony Of Wine, the story of famous French wine	2015	Musicmine Records Seoul
The Music Of Water	2015	Musicmine Records Seoul
The Piano	2015	Musicmine Records Seoul
The Romantic Piano	2015	Musicmine Records Seoul
Touchstone	2015	Musicmine Records Seoul
Trance From A Distant Land	2015	Musicmine Records Seoul

== Bibliography ==
=== Books ===
- Brieven aan een wonderkind – bespiegelingen over muziek, geluk, succes, glamour en het betrekkelijke van dit alles (Letters to a prodigy - reflections on music, happiness, success, glamour and the relativity of it all), Het Spectrum, 1993. ISBN 90 274 3436 0
- Beethoven was ook een zzp'er, Leporello Uitgevers, 2015. ISBN 978 90 79624 14 0

=== Books for Piano ===
- Water
- Flowers for a lady (Never Say Goodbye, Flowers For a Lady, Sunset Serenade, Friendship, To Love You Is To Live, Reflections, Strawberries for Breakfast, Only Then, Mother and Son, Tea With Claire)
- Inspiration
- La Grande Parade
- Visage
- Traveller
- Play it Easy (Play It Easy, I’ve No Time Today, The Moon Is A Balloon, On Top Of The World, Three Generations, The Tango, Blues For Charlotte, The Last Waltz, Sunshine)
- Rêverie 1, 2
- Serenata
- Songs for Piano

== Orchestral music ==
- De Geest van Laat Maar Waaien (The Spirit of Laissez-faire), a symphonic fairy tale about young people and the environment, text by Robert Long.
- De Verdwenen Minnares, a theater performance with Sanna Dia, voice and Sonja Volten, dance.
- De Domcantate, for the occasion of the 750th anniversary of the Cathedral of Utrecht (Dom), text by Ina Brouwer. The cantata was performed with the Toonkunstkoor and Henk Westbroek as narrator.
- De Rabocantate, a special commission for the farewell of the director of 'Rabo Utrecht' Ko van der Maas. Text: Ina Brouwer with the cooperation of the Toonkunstkoor and narrator Henk Westbroek.
- Dance Opera Orfeo, a cross-over of Electronic dance music, classical music and opera. Performed by dance group ISH (multidisciplinary theater) and Porgy Franssen as narrator. Premiere October 2005, as opening of the Amsterdam Dance Event.
- De Bosporus Suite, a co-production with Foundation Kulsan Amsterdam who brings Turkish classical music to the Dutch theaters. Van Rooyen incorporated old Turkish and Greek instruments in the composition: the Ney and the Oud.
- Let’s Twitter, a symphony, commissioned by Achmea and performed at the congress de Pensioen Expeditie on 21 November 2012 in cooperation with the Amsterdam Student Orchestra. In 2013 a simplified arrangement was made for het Amsterdamse Leerorkest.

== Film scores ==
- Een Vlucht Regenwulpen (A Flight Rainbirds)
- Rembrandt fecit 1669
- Eline Vere
- Een vrouw als Eva (A Woman Like Eve)
- Serengeti Symphony
- Brandende Liefde
- Mysteries
- Lieve jongens (Dear Boys)
- Affair Play

== Musical theatre ==
Menthol, a musical composed in 2016, was commissioned by the Twente region. Van Rooyen wrote the piece together with composer Paul Maaswinkel. Menthol tells the story of the pioneer Joseph Sylvester (Menthol), the first black man in Hengelo, who sold toothpaste in the 1920s and married a local girl.

== Radio ==
Laurens van Rooyen's music can be heard regularly on radio stations in the United States, Japan, South Africa and Australia. The Japanese program ‘Radio Midnight Express’ daily plays 'Imaginary Landscapes' as its tune.
