= SCENECS International Debut Film Festival =

SCENECS International Debut Film Festival, is held annually in Hilversum, the Netherlands and is produced by the SCENECS foundation.

== Festival ==
The festival uniquely promotes new and emerging filmmakers from around the world. It provides a platform to introduce themselves and their craft to their new audience and also to the film industry. Here, the completed films receive their first preview. The entries also participate in an international competition in the categories fiction, short fiction, documentary and student film. The winning entries in each category receive an award, which is presented at the SCENECS Grand Gala Award Event, this ceremony wraps up the end of the festival on the last night. SCENECS consist of a film festival, award ceremony, international exchange program and different activities with regards to film education and the development of talent.

== History ==
The festival was founded in 2006 by the film maker Arya Tariverdi and organised in Amersfoort, the Netherlands. It is the first film festival in the Netherlands to focus entirely on debutant filmmakers. In 2016 the festivalmoved its program and head office to the media city of Hilversum.

== Festival locations ==
The venues of the festival are currently: VUE Hilversum, Studio 21, Film Theater Hilversum and various libraries.

== Awards ==
=== Official award ===
This award, called "the Dutch Golden Stone Award" is in the image of a winged female form, with a golden stone in her hands. The Award for the First Edition of the Filmfestival was initially designed by Isabeau Nagel but due to reproductive issues & artistic differences on the adaption of the first design, the Award for the following filmfestivals was re-designed and further produced by the Dutch artist Ellis de Kreij.

=== Award categories ===
The Dutch Golden Stone Award is awarded during the annual Grand Gala Award Event to the directors of the categories of Best Fiction, Best Short Fiction, Best Documentary and Best Student Film. In addition awards are also presented in the categories of Best Acting Talent, Audience Award and Litetime Achievement Award.

=== Miss SCENECS Film Festival ===
In 2006 the festival introduced "Miss SCENECS Film Festival". Every year a young talented woman from the entertainment and film industry is selected by the organization and awarded with this title. Her role in this title is as festival ambassador and promote its activities. Miss SCENECS Film Festival portraits the Dutch Golden Stone Award and during the award event she awards the winners. In 2017 Miss Asia Pacific International (2016), Tessa le Conge was awarded with this title.

== Award winners ==
=== SCENECS Award for Best Fiction ===
Year	Film	Director	Country
2006	Zeven Zonden	Naäma Palfrey	Netherlands
2007	Gödel	Igor Kramer	Netherlands
2008	Brand	Niels Bourgonje	Netherlands
2009	Bingo	Timur Ismailov	Azerbaijan
2010	Wing: The Fish That Talked Back	Ricky Rijneke	Netherlands
2011	Geen Weg Terug	Shariff Korver	Netherlands
2012	Atomes	Arnaud Dufeys	Belgium
2013	Silent Ones	Ricky Rijneke	Netherlands
2014	Bahar In Wonderland	Behrooz Karamzizade	Germany
2015	Beste Vrienden	Ruwan Heggelman	Netherlands
2016	Journey To The Mother	Mikhail Kosyrev Nesterov	France / Russia
2017	Tenderness	Emilia Zielonka	Poland
2018	An American In Texas	Anthony Pedone	United States

=== SCENECS Award for Best Short Fiction ===
Year	Film	Director	Country
2016	One In	Vasha Narace	Trinidad and Tobago
2017	The Wedding Patrol	Rogier Hardeman	Germany
2018	You Did Not Forget	Simon Intihar	Slovenia

=== SCENECS Award for Best Documentary ===
Year	Film	Director	Country
2006	Vingers Op Het Glas	Olaf Koelewijn & Edwin Bakker	Netherlands
2007	Zo Is Dat – Het Zijn En De Aarde	Elizabeth Rocha Salgado	Netherlands
2008	Ypke	Jasper Huizinga	Netherlands
2009	Diary of a Times Square Thief	Klaas Bense	Netherlands
2010	Lonely Pack	Justin Peach	Germany
2011	Village Without Women	Srdjan Sarenac	Bosnia and Herzegovina
2012	Meanwhile in Mamelodi	Benjamin Kahlmeyer	Germany
2013	Odysseus Gambit	Alex Lora Cercos	Spain
2014	North East Hard West	Bart van den Aardweg	Netherlands
2016	A Lizard Under the Skin	Maud Neve	Belgium
2017	Closer to Maarten	Raimond Grimbergen	Netherlands
2018	The Island	Adam Weingrod	Israel

=== SCENECS Lifetime Achievement Award ===
Year	Director / Producer
2009	Jos Stelling
2010	Jean van den Velde
2011	Pieter Verhoeff
2012	Dick Maas
2013	Dave Schram & Maria Peters
2014	Hans de Wolf
2016	Steven de Jong
2017	Jeroen Beker

=== VUE Audience Award ===
Year	Film	Director	Country
2011	Lieve Anne-Marieke	Anne-Marieke Graafmans	Netherlands
2012	Framing the Other	Willem Timmers & Ilja Kok	Netherlands
2013	Onomkeerbaar	Maaike Broos	Netherlands
2014	Bonapetit!	Anastasia Lukovnikova	Russia
2014	Last of you	Dan Sachar	Israel
2015	Dance Iranian Style	Farshad Aria	Netherlands
2016	Gender Victory	Len Enkhuizen	Netherlands
2017	A Lifetime of Love	Carilijne Pieters	Netherlands
2018	Wheels of Change	Jaime Prins	Netherlands

=== SCENECS Talent Award ===
Year	Film	Director	Country
2016	Mannenpraat	Sean Musch, Manon Zwaan & Richard van der Spoel	Netherlands
2017	Always Move Forward	Fergus Riem Vis	Netherlands
2018	Breaking Borders	Barabara Vollebregt en Fatima Warsame	Netherlands

=== SCENECS Award for Best Acting Talent ===
Year	Film	Director	Country
2017	Spaak	Tim Douwsma	Netherlands
2018	The Conductor	Christanne de Bruijn	Netherlands
