= 1975 Cannes Film Festival =

- Official poster of the 28th Cannes Film Festival, an original illustration by Polish painter Wojciech Siudmak.
- Opening film: A Happy Divorce
- Closing film: Tommy
- Location: Cannes, France
- Founded: 1946
- Awards: Palme d'Or: Chronicle of the Years of Fire
- No. of films: 22 (In Competition)
- Festival date: 9 May 1975 – 23 May 1975
- Website: festival-cannes.com/en

Cannes Film Festival
- 1976 1974

The 28th Cannes Film Festival took place from 9 to 23 May 1975. French actress Jeanne Moreau served as jury president for the main competition.

Algerian filmmaker Mohammed Lakhdar-Hamina won the Palme d'Or, the festival's top prize, for the drama film Chronicle of the Years of Fire.

In 1975, a new non-competitive section, Les Yeux fertiles, was introduced. This section was later integrated into the Un Certain Regard section in 1978.

The festival opened with A Happy Divorce by Henning Carlsen, and closed with Tommy by Ken Russell.

== Juries ==
=== Main Competition ===
- Jeanne Moreau, French actress - Jury President
- Anthony Burgess, English author
- André Delvaux, Belgian filmmaker
- Gérard Ducaux-Rupp, French producer
- George Roy Hill, American filmmaker
- Lea Massari, Italian actress
- Pierre Mazars, journalist
- Fernando Rey, Spanish actor
- Pierre Salinger, American journalist
- Yuliya Solntseva, Soviet actress and filmmaker

== Official selection ==
=== In Competition ===
The following feature films competed for the Palme d'Or:

English title	Original title	Director(s)	Production country
Alice Doesn't Live Here Anymore		Martin Scorsese	United States
Aloïse		Liliane de Kermadec	France
The Amulet of Ogum	O Amuleto de Ogum	Nelson Pereira dos Santos	Brazil
Cher Victor	Ce cher Victor	Robin Davis	France
Chronicle of the Years of Fire	وقائع سنين الجمر	Mohammed Lakhdar-Hamina	Algeria
Do You Hear the Dogs Barking?	¿No oyes ladrar los perros?	François Reichenbach	Mexico
Electra, My Love	Szerelmem, Elektra	Miklós Jancsó	Hungary
The Enigma of Kaspar Hauser	Jeder für sich und Gott gegen alle	Werner Herzog	West Germany
A Happy Divorce (opening film)	En lykkelig skilsmisse	Henning Carlsen	France, Denmark
Lenny		Bob Fosse	United States
Lotte in Weimar		Egon Günther	East Germany
Man Friday		Jack Gold	United Kingdom, United States
Mariken van Nieumeghen		Jos Stelling	Netherlands
Orders	Les Ordres	Michel Brault	Canada
The Passenger	Professione: Reporter	Michelangelo Antonioni	Italy, Spain, France
Pastoral: To Die in the Country	田園に死す	Shūji Terayama	Japan
Scent of a Woman	Profumo di donna	Dino Risi	Italy
Special Section	Section spéciale	Costa-Gavras	France
The Story of Sin	Dzieje grzechu	Walerian Borowczyk	Poland
They Fought for Their Country	Они сражались за Родину	Sergei Bondarchuk	Soviet Union
A Touch of Zen	俠女	King Hu	Taiwan, Hong Kong
Yuppi du		Adriano Celentano	Italy

=== Out of Competition ===
The following films were selected to be screened out of competition:

English title	Original title	Director(s)	Production country
A Csodalatos Mandarin		Miklós Szinetár	Hungary
A faból faragott királyfi		Ádám Horváth	Hungary
Anna Karenina	Анна Каренина	Margarita Pilikhina	Soviet Union
The Day of the Locust		John Schlesinger	United States
Galileo		Joseph Losey	United Kingdom
Georges Braque ou le temps différent		Frédéric Rossif	France
India Song		Marguerite Duras	France
Je t'aime, tu danses		François Weyergans	Belgium
The Magic Flute	Trollflöjten	Ingmar Bergman	Sweden
The Maids		Christopher Miles	United Kingdom
Moses and Aaron	Moses und Aron	Jean-Marie Straub and Danièle Huillet	West Germany
The Romantic Englishwoman		Joseph Losey	United Kingdom
Tommy (closing film)		Ken Russell	United Kingdom

=== Short Films Competition ===
The following short films competed for the Short Film Palme d'Or:

- La Corrida by Christian Broutin
- Daryu tebe zvezdu by Fyodor Khitruk
- Don't by Robin Lehman
- L'empreinte by Jacques Cardon
- Kolory życia (Les couleurs de la vie) by Piotr Szpakowicz
- Lautrec by Geoff Dunbar
- Pedestrians by Andrew Ruhl
- Revisited by Joyce Borenstein
- W.O.W. (Women of the World) by Faith Hubley

== Parallel sections ==
=== International Critics' Week ===
The following feature films were screened for the 14th International Critics' Week (14e Semaine de la Critique):

- Assassination in Davos (Konfrontation) by Rolf Lyssy (Switzerland)
- Brother Can You Spare a Dime? by Philippe Mora (United Kingdom)
- Vase de noces by Thierry Zeno (Belgium)
- Hester Street by Joan Micklin Silver (United States)
- Knots by David I. Munro (United Kingdom)
- The Musician Killer (L’Assassin musicien) by Benoît Jacquot (France)
- The Peaceful Age (L'età della pace) by Fabio Carpi (Italy)

=== Directors' Fortnight ===
The following films were screened for the 1975 Directors' Fortnight (Quinzaine des Réalizateurs):

- Allonsanfan by Paolo and Vittorio Taviani (Italy)
- The Battle of Chile (part 1) (La batalla de Chile: La lucha de un pueblo sin armas - Primera parte: La insurrección de la burguesía) by Patricio Guzman (Chile, Cuba)
- Black Angel (Der schwarze Engel) by Werner Schroeter (West Germany)
- Chac by Rolando Klein (Panama)
- Conjugal Warfare (Guerra conjugal) by Joaquim Pedro de Andrade (Brazil)
- Di Assimanton Aformin by Tassos Psarras (Greece)
- Fox and His Friends (Faustrecht der Freiheit) by Rainer Werner Fassbinder (West Germany)
- French Provincial (Souvenirs d’en France) by André Téchiné (France)
- Jeanne Dielman, 23 Quai du Commerce, 1080 Bruxelles by Chantal Akerman (Belgium, France)
- The Last Day of School Before Christmas (L'ultimo giorno di scuola prima delle vacanze di Natale) by Gian Vittorio Baldi (Italy)
- Milestones by Robert Kramer, John Douglas (United States)
- Njangaan (The Disciple) by Mahama Johnson Traoré (Senegal)
- Les oeillets rouges d'avril by Véra Belmont (France)
- Das Rückendekollete by Jan Nemec (Switzerland)
- Schoolmaster Hofer (Hauptlehrer Hofer) by Peter Lilienthal (West Germany)
- Shazdeh Ehtedjab (Prince Ehtedjab) by Bahman Farmanara (Iran)
- Strah by Matjaz Klopcic (Yugoslavia)
- Strike! (Streik!) by Oddvar Bull Tuhus (Norway)
- Sunday Too Far Away by Ken Hannam (Australia)
- The Texas Chain Saw Massacre by Tobe Hooper (United States)
- The Travelling Players (O Thiassos) by Theo Angelopoulos (Greece)
- The Vultures (Les vautours) by Jean-Claude Labrecque (Canada)
- Zone Interdite by Ahmed Lallem (Algeria)

Short films

- 16+- (Chofuku-Ki) by Shuji Terayama (Japan)
- 350 by Philippe Pilard (France)
- Echos d'Alger 1955 by Frank Cassenti (France)
- L'Economie des sentiments by Daniel Jouanisson (France)
- Manosolfa by Sandra Coelho de Souza (Brazil)
- Monopolis by Claude Dubrana, J.P. Zirn (France)
- Tadii by Nooradin Zarrin Kelk (Iran)

== Official Awards ==
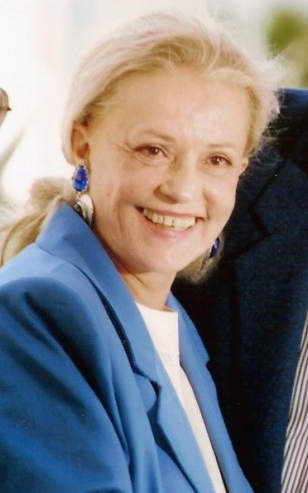
Jeanne Moreau, Jury President

=== In Competition ===
- Palme d'Or: Chronicle of the Years of Fire by Mohammed Lakhdar-Hamina
- Grand Prix: The Enigma of Kaspar Hauser by Werner Herzog
- Best Director:
  - Costa-Gavras for Special Section
  - Michel Brault for Orders
- Best Actress: Valerie Perrine for Lenny
- Best Actor: Vittorio Gassman for Scent of a Woman

=== Short Film Palme d'Or ===
- Lautrec by Geoff Dunbar
- Special Jury Prize: Daryu tebe zvezdu by Fyodor Khitruk

== Independent Awards ==
=== FIPRESCI Prize ===
- The Enigma of Kaspar Hauser by Werner Herzog
- The Travelling Players by Theo Angelopoulos

=== Commission Supérieure Technique ===
- Technical Grand Prize: A Touch of Zen by King Hu

=== Prize of the Ecumenical Jury ===
- The Enigma of Kaspar Hauser by Werner Herzog

== Media ==
- INA: Jeanne Moreau, president of the 1975 jury (interview in French) Jean Moreau states in the interview that more important than even the Main Selection have become the events of the Parallel Section (Directors' Fortnight, International Critics' Week, and Marché du Film) which make possible the existence of the Festival.
