= Breakthrough role =

Term used in the theatre, film and television industry

In the theatre, film, and television industries, a breakthrough role, also known as a breakout role, is a role performed by an actor or actress which contributed significantly to the development of their career and the beginning of critical recognition. A breakthrough role is often a significant increase in importance in the actor's part, such as moving up from a minor character to one of the main cast or a "high impact" role in a film, play or show which has mainstream success and results in the actor's widespread recognition and popularity. A breakthrough performance has also been defined as one which "attracts the attention of film critics, or receives rave reviews and is subsequently nominated for many major awards".
