= Milena Canonero =

Italian costume designer (born 1952)

Milena Canonero OMRI
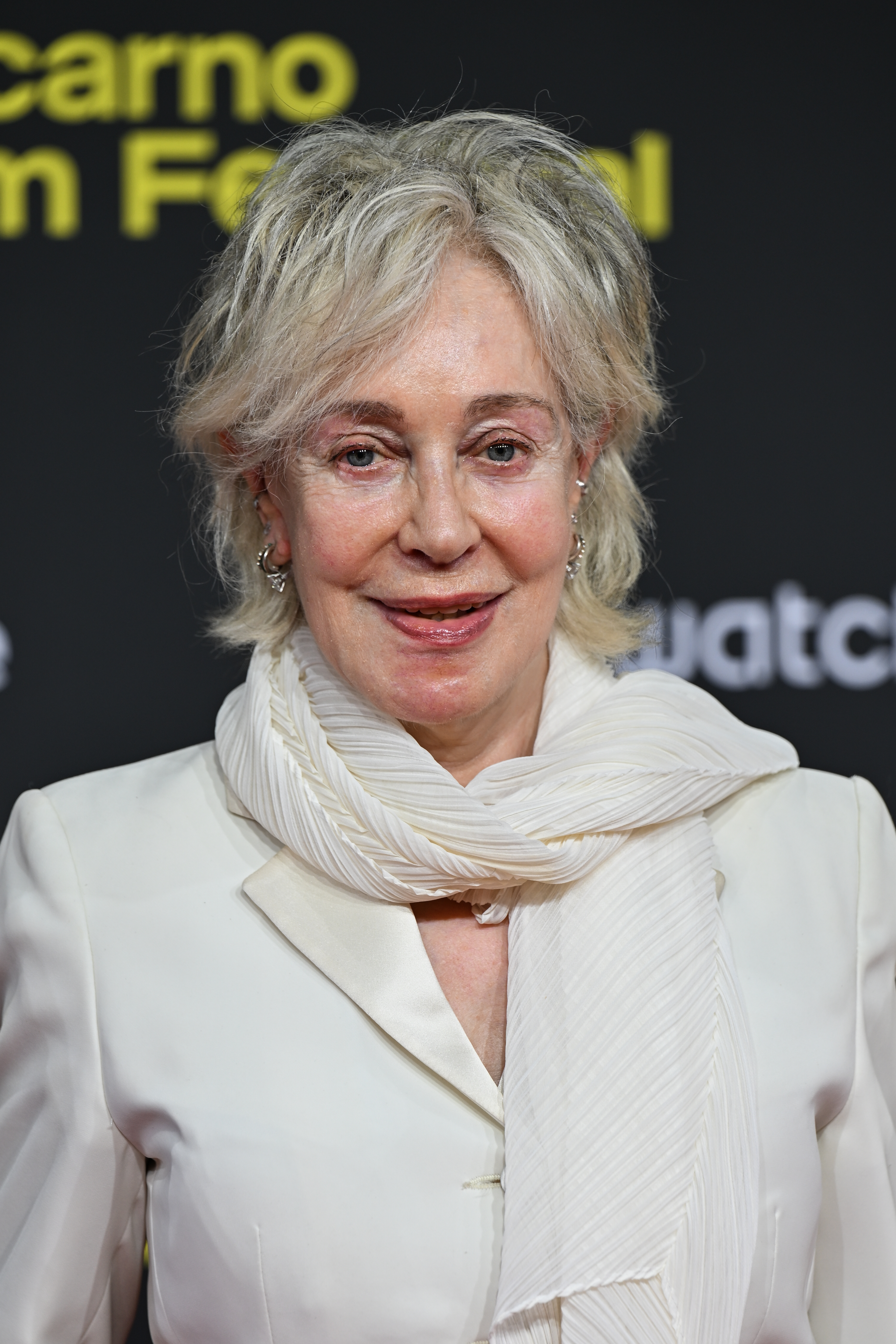
- Canonero at the 2025 Locarno Film Festival
- Born: Turin, Italy
- Occupations: Costume designer; production designer; film producer
- Years active: 1971–present
- Spouse: Marshall Bell (m. 1980)

Milena Canonero OMRI (born 1 January 1946) is an Italian costume designer. She has received numerous accolades, including four Academy Awards, three BAFTA Awards, and two Costume Designers Guild Awards. She was honored with the Costume Designers Guild Career Achievement Award in 2001 and the Honorary Golden Bear in 2017.

Canonero frequently collaborated with directors Stanley Kubrick, Francis Ford Coppola, and Wes Anderson. She has received nine nominations for the Academy Award for Best Costume Design and has won four times for Barry Lyndon (1975), Chariots of Fire (1981), Marie Antoinette (2006), and The Grand Budapest Hotel (2014).

== Early life and education ==
Canonero was born in Turin, Italy. She attended university in Genoa, studying fashion, period design, and art history before moving to England in the late 1960s. She designed for friends' London boutiques and began assisting in commercials, meeting many filmmakers along the way. By chance, Canonero was also invited to watch Stanley Kubrick shoot parts of the landmark 2001: A Space Odyssey (1968), and the director asked her to collaborate with him on his next feature film.

== Career ==
Canonero received her first major screen credits for designing costumes for Kubrick's dystopian classic A Clockwork Orange (1971), based on Anthony Burgess' novel of the same name. She created an instantly recognizable character's wardrobe that perfectly captures the film's discourse on class, money, and power through provoking aesthetics, which has since become an enduring inspiration for fashion icons and designers. Kubrick and Canonero continued their collaboration on the epic period drama Barry Lyndon (1975), based on the 1844 novel by William Makepeace Thackeray about social ladder in Georgian era Britain. She and Swedish costume designer Ulla-Britt Söderlund examined original 18th-century attire at London's Victoria and Albert Museum and copied patterns from the collection to produce authentic-looking film garments. In their designs, the pair also drew inspiration from the period-defining art, including portraits by Thomas Gainsborough and Joshua Reynolds, as well as paintings by Jean Siméon Chardin and William Hogarth, among others. They also sourced vintage fabrics, laces, and clothing from auction houses and private collections. By combining crafted film pieces with original clothing, the designers achieved unrivaled for the period drama authenticity sought by the director. Given the grand scale of production, the biggest challenge, however, was Kubrick's innovative decision to lens the film using only daylight or faint, flickering candlelight. Taking that into account, the costumes had to stand out noticeably both in shape and texture. Canonero and Söderlund won the Academy Award for Best Costume Design for their exceptional work. At one point, George Lucas approached her to design costumes for his 1977 landmark space opera Star Wars, an offer she eventually turned down while later considered it to be the biggest lost opportunity of her career. Canonero worked with Kubrick once again on the cult psychological horror The Shining (1980), based on Stephen King's novel of the same name. She won her second Academy Award for another collaboration with director Hugh Hudson, with whom she previously worked on the short film back in the early 1970s. This time they reunited on his iconic sports drama Chariots of Fire (1981), the true story of two British athletes in the 1924 Olympics. She superbly interpreted the 1920s English tweeds, blazers, and college garb to the extent of inspiring 1980s fashion trends; such great success led to an offer for Canonero to create a clothing line for men's-wear manufacturer Norman Hilton, for which she received a special Coty Award.

Canonero’s next major film was Sydney Pollack's Out of Africa (1985), based on Danish author Karen Blixen's autobiographical memoir of the same name about her decade-long experiences in colonial Kenya starting just before the outbreak of World War I. Canonero faced a formidable challenge when tasked in a strict three-month term to research, design, and produce hundreds of costumes appropriate for a vast ensemble of characters that includes African natives, white hunters, and European nobility. It took her on an intense journey everywhere, from the New York Public Library to the various museums and costume houses across England and Italy, and from the Blixen’s home in Denmark to Africa, where she met anthropologist Richard Leakey, who consulted her on less known aspects of African fashion in the 1910s, especially those regarding the indigenous groups.

Beside her well-established screen career, Canonero is known for creating costumes for stage. She frequently collaborated with director Otto Schenk on his numerous opera productions. Those include Il trittico (Vienna State Opera, 1979), As You Like It (Salzburg Festival, 1980), Die Fledermaus (Vienna State Opera, 1980), Andrea Chénier (Vienna State Opera, 1981), and Arabella (Metropolitan Opera, 1983). Canonero provided the costumes and set design for Roman Polanski's 1999 production of Peter Shaffer's Amadeus at Milan's Teatro Manzoni. She also worked with director Luc Bondy on such productions as Tosca (Metropolitan Opera, 2009) and Helena (Burgtheater, 2010).

On television, Canonero designed costumes for crime drama series Miami Vice in the 1980s.

In 2001, Canonero received the Career Achievement Award in Film from the Costume Designers Guild. She won her third Oscar for Sofia Coppola's Marie Antoinette (2006).

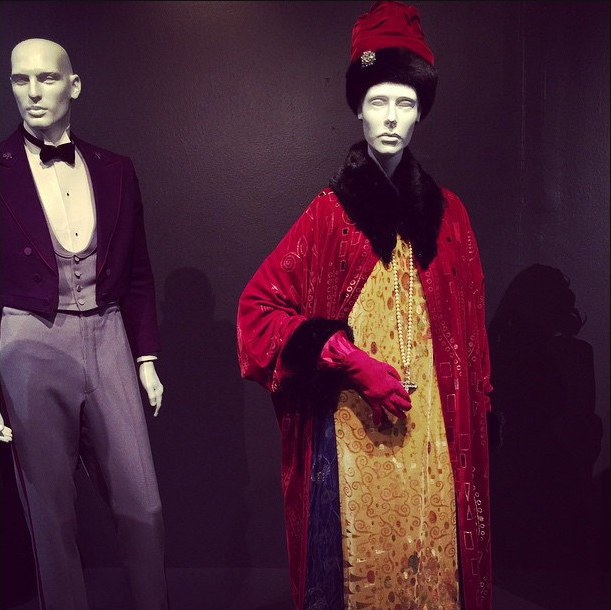
Details of the costumes worn by Ralph Fiennes and Tilda Swinton in The Grand Budapest Hotel, designed by Canonero.

Canonero received her fourth Academy Award for The Grand Budapest Hotel (2014), directed by Wes Anderson. This marked her third collaboration with the director, as they had previously worked together on The Life Aquatic with Steve Zissou (2004) and The Darjeeling Limited (2007).

In 2020, Canonero designed costumes for 200 singers inspired by styles from the 15th century to 1950 for the backdrop of the Louis Vuitton automn-winter 2020 runway.

== Personal life ==
Canonero is married to actor Marshall Bell. As of 2025, Canonero is based out of Rome, Italy.

== Filmography ==
Year	Title	Director	Notes
1971	A Clockwork Orange	Stanley Kubrick	
1975	Barry Lyndon	Stanley Kubrick	with Ulla-Britt Söderlund
1977	The Disappearance	Stuart Cooper	
1978	Midnight Express	Alan Parker	
1980	The Shining	Stanley Kubrick	
1981	Chariots of Fire	Hugh Hudson	
1983	The Hunger	Tony Scott	
1984	Give My Regards to Broad Street	Peter Webb	
1984	The Cotton Club	Francis Ford Coppola	
1985	Out of Africa	Sydney Pollack	
1987	Good Morning, Babylon	Paolo Taviani; Vittorio Taviani	Associate producer
1987	Barfly	Barbet Schroeder	
1988	Tucker: The Man and His Dream	Francis Ford Coppola	
1989	Lost Angels	Hugh Hudson	Costume design consultant
1990	The Bachelor	Roberto Faenza	with Alberto Verso
1990	Dick Tracy	Warren Beatty	
1990	Reversal of Fortune	Barbet Schroeder	Costume consultant
1990	The Godfather Part III	Francis Ford Coppola	
1992	Single White Female	Barbet Schroeder	Also production designer
1992	Damage	Louis Malle	
1994	Only You	Norman Jewison	
1994	Love Affair	Glenn Gordon Caron	
1994	Camilla	Deepa Mehta	
1994	Death and the Maiden	Roman Polanski	
1998	Bulworth	Warren Beatty	
1999	Titus	Julie Taymor	
2001	The Affair of the Necklace	Charles Shyer	
2002	Solaris	Steven Soderbergh	
2004	Eros	Steven Soderbergh	Segment: "Equilibrium"
2004	Ocean's Twelve	Steven Soderbergh	
2004	The Life Aquatic with Steve Zissou	Wes Anderson	
2006	Marie Antoinette	Sofia Coppola	
2006	Belle Toujours	Manoel de Oliveira	
2007	Hotel Chevalier	Wes Anderson	Short film acts as a prologue to The Darjeeling Limited
2007	The Darjeeling Limited	Wes Anderson	
2007	I Viceré	Roberto Faenza	
2010	The Wolfman	Joe Johnston	
2011	Carnage	Roman Polanski	
2011	Someday This Pain Will Be Useful to You	Roberto Faenza	Producer
2013	Romeo & Juliet	Carlo Carlei	Co-producer
2013	Something Good	Luca Barbareschi	
2013	Castello Cavalcanti	Wes Anderson	Short film commissioned by Prada
2014	The Grand Budapest Hotel	Wes Anderson	
2016	Paris Can Wait	Eleanor Coppola	
2018	The Sisters Brothers	Jacques Audiard	
2021	The French Dispatch	Wes Anderson	
2022	Hill of Vision	Roberto Faenza	with Bojana Nikitovic; Also producer
2023	Asteroid City	Wes Anderson	
2024	Megalopolis	Francis Ford Coppola	
2025	The Phoenician Scheme	Wes Anderson	

== Awards and nominations ==
Major associations

Academy Awards

Year	Category	Nominated work	Result	Ref.
1976	Best Costume Design	Barry Lyndon	Won	
1982	Best Costume Design	Chariots of Fire	Won	
1986	Best Costume Design	Out of Africa	Nominated	
1989	Best Costume Design	Tucker: The Man and His Dream	Nominated	
1991	Best Costume Design	Dick Tracy	Nominated	
2000	Best Costume Design	Titus	Nominated	
2002	Best Costume Design	The Affair of the Necklace	Nominated	
2007	Best Costume Design	Marie Antoinette	Won	
2015	Best Costume Design	The Grand Budapest Hotel	Won	

BAFTA Awards

Year	Category	Nominated work	Result	Ref.
British Academy Film Awards
1976	Best Costume Design	Barry Lyndon	Nominated	
1982	Best Costume Design	Chariots of Fire	Won	
1986	Best Costume Design	The Cotton Club	Won	
1987	Best Costume Design	Out of Africa	Nominated	
1991	Best Costume Design	Dick Tracy	Nominated	
2007	Best Costume Design	Marie Antoinette	Nominated	
2015	Best Costume Design	The Grand Budapest Hotel	Won	
2022	Best Costume Design	The French Dispatch	Nominated	

Miscellaneous awards

List of Milena Canonero other awards and nominations
Award	Year (Note: Indicates the year of ceremony. Each year is linked to the article about the awards held that year, wherever possible.)	Category	Title	Result	Ref.
Berlin International Film Festival	2017	Honorary Golden Bear	—N/a	Honored	
César Awards	2019	Best Costume Design	The Sisters Brothers	Nominated	
Chicago Film Critics Association Awards	2023	Best Costume Design	Asteroid City	Nominated	
Ciak d'oro	1990	Best Costume Design	The Bachelor	Nominated	
Ciak d'oro	2008	Best Costume Design	I Viceré	Nominated	
Costume Designers Guild Awards	2001	Career Achievement Award	—N/a	Honored	
Costume Designers Guild Awards	2005	Excellence in Contemporary Film	The Life Aquatic with Steve Zissou	Won	
Costume Designers Guild Awards	2005	Excellence in Contemporary Film	Ocean's Twelve	Nominated	
Costume Designers Guild Awards	2007	Excellence in Period Film	Marie Antoinette	Nominated	
Costume Designers Guild Awards	2015	Excellence in Period Film	The Grand Budapest Hotel	Won	
Costume Designers Guild Awards	2017	Excellence in Short Form Design	H&M: "Come Together"	Nominated	
Coty Awards	1984	Special Award for tailored clothing	—N/a	Honored	
Critics' Choice Awards	2015	Best Costume Design	The Grand Budapest Hotel	Won	
David di Donatello Awards	1990	Best Costumes	The Bachelor	Nominated	
David di Donatello Awards	2008	Best Costumes	I Viceré	Won	
Hollywood Film Awards	2014	Hollywood Costume Design Award	The Grand Budapest Hotel	Won	
Las Vegas Film Critics Society Awards	2000	Best Costume Design	Titus	Nominated	
Las Vegas Film Critics Society Awards	2006	Best Costume Design	Marie Antoinette	Won	
Locarno Film Festival	2025	Vision Award	—N/a	Honored	
Nastro d'Argento Awards	1989	Best Costume Design	Tucker: The Man and His Dream	Nominated	
Nastro d'Argento Awards	1991	Best Costume Design	The Bachelor	Nominated	
Nastro d'Argento Awards	2007	Best Costume Design	Marie Antoinette	Won	
Nastro d'Argento Awards	2008	Best Costume Design	I Viceré	Won	
Nastro d'Argento Awards	2012	Best Producer	Someday This Pain Will Be Useful to You	Nominated	
Nastro d'Argento Awards	2014	Best Costume Design	The Grand Budapest Hotel and Something Good	Won	
Online Film Critics Society Awards	2022	Best Costume Design	The French Dispatch	Nominated	
Online Film Critics Society Awards	2024	Best Costume Design	Asteroid City	Nominated	
Phoenix Film Critics Society Awards	2006	Best Costume Design	Marie Antoinette	Won	
Phoenix Film Critics Society Awards	2014	Best Costume Design	The Grand Budapest Hotel	Won	
Rodeo Drive Walk of Style	2006	Rodeo Drive Walk of Style Award	—N/a	Honored	
Satellite Awards	2000	Best Costume Design	Titus	Nominated	
Satellite Awards	2002	Best Costume Design	The Affair of the Necklace	Nominated	
Satellite Awards	2006	Best Costume Design	Marie Antoinette	Nominated	
Satellite Awards	2015	Best Costume Design	The Grand Budapest Hotel	Won	
Saturn Awards	1984	Best Costume Design	The Hunger	Nominated	
Saturn Awards	1991	Best Costume Design	Dick Tracy	Nominated	
Saturn Awards	2011	Best Costume Design	The Wolfman	Nominated	
Seattle Film Critics Society Awards (Note: prior to the SFCS formal establishment in 2016, a group of Seattle-area critics compiled the Seattle Film Critics Awards in 2014 and 2015.)	2015	Best Costume Design	The Grand Budapest Hotel	Won	
Seattle Film Critics Society Awards	2025	Best Costume Design	The Phoenician Scheme	Nominated	

== Other honours ==
- Italy - Grand Cross of the Order of Merit of the Italian Republic on 21 December 2015.
