= Rembrandt fecit 1669 =

- Directed by: Jos Stelling
- Written by: Jos Stelling; Wil Hildebrand
- Starring: Frans Stelling; Ton de Koff; Lucie Singeling; Hanneke van der Velden; Aya Gill
- Cinematography: Ernest Bresser
- Music by: Laurens van Rooyen
- Distributed by: Tuschinski Film Distribution
- Release date: 1977
- Running time: 107 minutes
- Country: Netherlands
- Language: Dutch

Rembrandt fecit 1669 is a 1977 Dutch film directed by Jos Stelling.

== Cast ==
- Frans Stelling - The young Rembrandt
- Ton de Koff - The old Rembrandt
- Lucie Singeling - Saskia van Uylenburg
- Aya Gill - Hendrikje Stoffels
- Hanneke van der Velden - Geertje Dircx
- Ed Kolmeijer - Titus
- Henk Douze
