= Alice Hendy =

British suicide prevention campaigner

Alice Hendy MBE
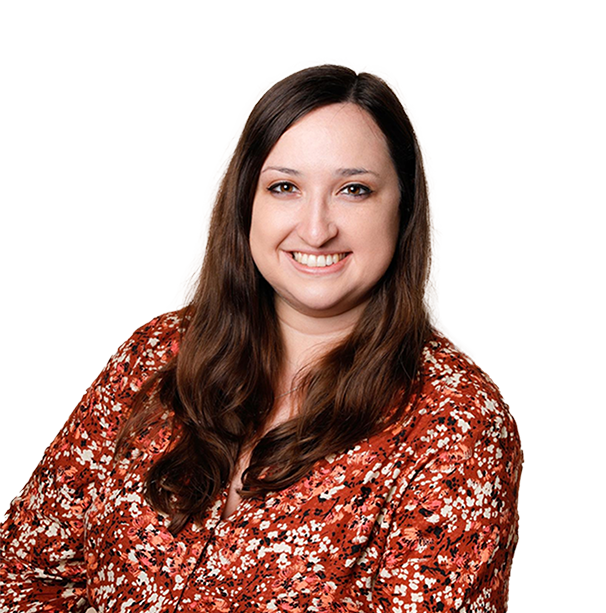
- Alice Hendy in 2025
- Occupation: Suicide prevention campaigner
- Known for: Founder of Ripple Suicide Prevention (2021)
- Awards: Member of the Order of the British Empire (2023)

Alice Hendy MBE is a British suicide prevention campaigner and the founder of the Ripple Suicide Prevention charity. She was appointed a Member of the Order of the British Empire (MBE) in the 2024 New Year Honours for services to suicide prevention and online safety.

== Early life and education ==
Hendy is based in the United Kingdom. Her younger brother, Josh, died by suicide in 2020 after viewing harmful online content. This led her to found the Ripple Suicide Prevention charity.

== Founding Ripple Suicide Prevention ==
In 2021, Hendy founded the Ripple Suicide Prevention charity. The charity provides a digital tool to support online safety and mental health.

In 2025, the organisation was recognised with the King's Award for Enterprise in the category of Innovation. In 2025, Hendy received the Centre for Social Justice from England manager Gareth Southgate in recognition of her work.

Hendy is a life-long supporter of football club West Ham United and the club has worked with Ripple Suicide Prevention extensively since its founding.

== Recognition and honours ==
In 2021, Hendy received the Entrepreneur of Excellence Award at the National Diversity Awards, recognising her work to promote digital safety and mental health equity.

In 2023, she was appointed a Member of the Order of the British Empire (MBE) for services to suicide prevention. Specifically, the award recognised her founding of the Ripple Suicide Prevention charity and campaigning for wider recognition of the importance of suicide prevention and intervention.

In 2024, Hendy was named Computing magazine's Woman of the Year at the Women in Tech Excellence Awards for her work in digital mental health. Additionally, she was named one of Computer Weekly’s Women in UK Tech Rising Stars for 2024. The publication cited her contribution to online safety.

In 2025, Hendy was awarded an Honorary Doctorate from her alma mater, University of Portsmouth. Announcing the award, the University noted: 'The University is also proud to honour remarkable individuals whose work directly impacts local and national communities, including suicide prevention campaigner Alice Hendy MBE - whose life-saving digital intervention has intercepted over 100,000 harmful online searches worldwide.' Hendy received her award at the same time as notable others, including Tim Campbell and Sabrina Dhowre.

== Media appearances ==
Hendy has been featured in national UK media, including the BBC, Sky News, ITV, and newspapers such as the Daily Mirror and The Independent, in relation to suicide prevention and digital safety. She was also a featured speaker at the 2023 TEDxNHS event, delivering a talk on digital tools for suicide prevention.
