= People Meet and Sweet Music Fills the Heart =

- Front cover of the Danish DVD
- Directed by: Henning Carlsen
- Written by: Poul Borum; Henning Carlsen
- Based on: 1944 novel by Jens August Schade
- Produced by: Göran Lindgren; Henning Carlsen
- Starring: Harriet Andersson; Preben Neergaard
- Cinematography: Henning Kristiansen
- Edited by: Henning Carlsen
- Music by: Krzysztof Komeda
- Distributed by: Nordisk Film
- Release date: 24 November 1967
- Running time: 111 minutes
- Countries: Denmark; Sweden
- Language: Danish

People Meet and Sweet Music Fills the Heart, (Danish: Mennesker mødes og sød musik opstår i hjertet), is a 1967 Danish/Swedish romantic comedy directed by Henning Carlsen and starring Harriet Andersson and Preben Neergaard. The film is based upon the 1944 novel by Jens August Schade.

== Cast ==
Actor	Role
Harriet Andersson	Sofia Persson
Preben Neergaard	Sjalof Hansen
Eva Dahlbeck	Devah Sørensen
Erik Wedersøe	Hans Madsen
Lone Rode	Evangeline Hansen
Lotte Horne	Mithra
Elin Reimer	Calcura
Bent Christensen	Ramon Salvador
Lotte Tarp	Kose
Knud Rex	Ramon Salvador
Georg Rydeberg	Robert Clair de Lune
Cassandra Mahon	Josefa Swell
Zito Kerras	Young Men in New York
Ove Rud	Clergyman
Benny Juhlin	Fresh Young Man

== Awards ==
People Meet and Sweet Music Fills the Heart won the Bodil Award for Best Danish Film in 1968, and for her leading role, the Swedish actress Andersson also received that year's Bodil Award for Best Actress. The film was also selected as the Danish entry for the Best Foreign Language Film at the 41st Academy Awards, but was not accepted as a nominee.

== See also ==
- List of submissions to the 41st Academy Awards for Best Foreign Language Film
- List of Danish submissions for the Academy Award for Best Foreign Language Film
