= A Happy Divorce =

1975 film

- Directed by: Henning Carlsen
- Written by: Benny Andersen; Henning Carlsen
- Produced by: Mag Bodard; Philippe Dussart
- Starring: Jean Rochefort
- Cinematography: Henning Kristiansen
- Edited by: Claire Giniewski; Christian Hartkopp
- Release date: 25 April 1975
- Running time: 102 minutes
- Countries: France; Denmark
- Languages: French; Danish

A Happy Divorce (Danish: En lykkelig skilsmisse, French: Un divorce heureux) is a 1975 Danish-French drama film directed by Henning Carlsen. It was entered into the 1975 Cannes Film Festival. Anne-Lise Gabold won a Bodil Award for Best Actress in a Supporting Role for Sylvie.

== Cast ==
- Jean Rochefort as Jean-Baptiste Morin
- André Dussollier as François
- Daniel Ceccaldi as Antoine
- Bulle Ogier as Marguerite
- Bernadette Lafont as Jacqueline, l'infirmière
- Anne-Lise Gabold as Sylvie
- Étienne Bierry as Pierre
