= Knud Rex =

Danish actor (1912–1968)

- Born: 30 March 1912; Copenhagen, Denmark
- Died: 24 December 1968 (aged 56)

Knud Rex (30 March 1912 – 24 December 1968) was a Danish stage and film actor.

== Filmography ==
- Sun Over Denmark - 1936
- Den gamle præst - 1939
- Komtessen på Stenholt - 1939
- Frøken Kirkemus - 1941
- Natekspressen (P. 903) - 1942
- Ta', hvad du vil ha' - 1947
- Lejlighed til leje - 1949
- Den stjålne minister - 1949
- Hejrenæs - 1953
- Hidden Fear - 1957
- Englen i sort - 1957
- Mig og min familie - 1957
- Skarpe skud i Nyhavn - 1957
- Lyssky transport gennem Danmark - 1958
- Skibet er ladet med - 1960
- Duellen - 1962
- En ven i bolignøden - 1965
- Slå først, Frede - 1965
- Utro - 1966
- Hunger - 1966
- Mennesker mødes og sød musik opstår i hjertet - 1967
- Lille mand, pas på! - 1968
