= The Pretenders (1981 film) =

1981 film

- Directed by: Jos Stelling
- Written by: Jos Stelling
- Starring: Evert Holtzer
- Cinematography: Deen Van der Zaken
- Release date: 19 March 1981
- Running time: 102 minutes
- Country: Netherlands
- Language: Dutch

The Pretenders (Dutch: De Pretenders) is a 1981 Dutch drama film directed by Jos Stelling. It was entered into the 12th Moscow International Film Festival.

== Cast ==
- Evert Holtzer as Evert
- Coby Stunnenberg as Greet
- Ad Rietveld as Adje
- Corina Singeling as Bep
- Ton van Dort as Herman
- Peter van Laar as Peter
- Bob Casandra as Bob
- Simone Dresens as Truus
- Henk Fakkeldij as Henk
