= Charity Film Awards =

British film awards ceremony

- Awarded for: Best Charitable film
- Country: United Kingdom
- First award: 2015–present
- Currently held by: Refuge - Make the world a Refuge
- Website: https://smileycharityfilmawards.com

The Charity Film Awards (CFAs) is a British film awards ceremony that is held annually. Each year campaign films are announced as winners following both a public vote and a final panel of judges.

Previous winners have included the UK LSD Collaborative, RSPCA, Macmillan, and NSPCC. It is recognised by the British Film Institute and IMDb.

== Overview ==
The Charity Film Awards is an annual competition recognising films created by charities, nonprofit organisations, and corporate social responsibility initiatives. Established in 2015, the awards aim to highlight the role of film in raising awareness and supporting charitable causes. Since its inception, the awards have grown into one of the largest initiatives of their kind. More than 6,000 charities have participated, and over one million individuals have taken part in the public voting process. By 2024, participating films had generated over 500 million film impressions, and the virtual ceremony attracted an audience of more than 2.7 million viewers. The awards are recognised by the British Film Institute and listed on IMDb.

The judging process consists of two stages: a public vote and final review by a panel of judges from the media, advertising, and charity sectors. Entries are categorised according to the income level of the submitting organisation, based on the turnover brackets defined by the Charity Commission to ensure comparability between organisations of different sizes. In addition to income-based categories, there are awards for long-form films (over eight minutes) and for international charities and corporate social responsibility campaigns through the “International Impact” and “Corporate Cause” categories. Winners in each income bracket may receive Gold, Silver, or Bronze awards, either through public voting (“People’s Choice Awards”) or judges' selection. The highest-rated films overall are recognised as “Charity Film of the Year” and “People’s Choice Film of the Year.”

The campaign incorporates a multi-platform communications strategy, including social media, digital PR, and livestreaming. Since 2022, the awards ceremony has been hosted by a celebrity presenter and broadcast on YouTube to a global audience. Over 300 new charities participate in the awards each year, with a record 520 entries submitted in 2025.

== History ==
The Charity Film Awards was launched in 2015 to recognise the role of film in promoting social change and to give greater visibility to films made by charities. The Charity Film Awards' first ceremony in 2015 shortlisted a number of British charities, including RSPCA, Barnardo's, the RNLI, Alzheimer's Society, and Great Ormond Street Children's Hospital. The eventual winner was St. John's Ambulance for "The Chokeables".

In 2021, the awards were acquired by Smiley Movement, a nonprofit supported by The Smiley Company, to expand their reach. The acquisition was led by Nicolas Loufrani, CEO of Smiley Movement, and supported by founder Simon Burton, who saw the support by Smiley Movement as a way to grow the awards' influence. The campaign and ceremony are sponsored by the Smiley brand as the main title sponsor.

Since 2022, the awards ceremony has been hosted annually by a celebrity presenter, with additional guest presenters introducing each category. Individual awards are also presented by celebrities. Presenters included Tom Allen, Julien MacDonald, Adam Pearson, Lemn Sissay, Kimberley Wyatt, Natasha Kaplinsky, Professor Green, Jodie Kidd, Shirley Ballas, Una Healy, Patsy Kensit, Anton Ferdinand, Patsy Palmer, and Kathryn Drysdale/ In 2025, television and radio presenter Lisa Snowdon hosted the ceremony at the Indigo O2 in London.

As the number of entrants expanded, so did the number of categories at the awards. In 2023, a new category—the International Impact Award—was launched to recognise cause-driven films produced outside the UK. Supported by The Bicester Collection, this category has received submissions from the United States, Europe, South Asia, and South America. Past recipients include World Connect Inc. (2023), the World Childhood Foundation USA (2024), and Pebbles Project (2025).

In 2024, the Charity Film Awards introduced a new category Champion of Change Award to recognise individuals who have made a substantial contribution to social progress. Past winners include: Nada Al Ahdal (2024) and Annabel Kiki (2025).

In both 2023 and 2024, TikTok served as the sponsor for the People's Choice Awards category, supporting public voting and increasing engagement.

The ceremony is streamed live on YouTube, allowing global audiences to view the event and engage with the films showcased.

The 2025 event, held at the Indigo at The O2 in London, had a record attendance of 1,400 guests and the livestream reached 182,000 views.

== Nomination ==
Charities entering the Smiley Charity Film Awards are grouped based on their income, using the Charity Commission’s turnover brackets from their most recent financial year. This approach ensures a level playing field, giving smaller organisations an equal chance of winning alongside larger, more established charities.

There are also specific categories for long-form films that run over eight minutes. These are divided into two groups: one for charities with an income under £5 million, and another for those with an income over £5 million.

Each income bracket is eligible for Gold, Silver, and Bronze awards, which are given either through public voting (People’s Choice) or selected by a panel of judges. The People’s Choice Awards go to the films that receive the most public votes during the voting period. Finally, the highest-rated entries from both the judges’ selection and public voting are awarded the prestigious titles of Charity Film of the Year and People’s Choice Film of the Year.

== Winners and nominees ==
=== 2017 ===
Grand Prix Winners

Category	Prize	Film name	Charity Name
Grand Prix	Film of the Year	The Chokeables advert: save a choking baby	St John Ambulance
Grand Prix	People’s Choice	Soi Dog Foundation: Love Will Always Triumph Over Evil	Soi Dog Foundation

Category Winners

Category	Film name	Charity Name
Under £10,000	Welcome to Bulambuli Valley	Communities for Development
£10,000 – £100,000	I Won't Go Quiet	The Loss Foundation
£100,000 – £500,000	Support and Love Via Education International	Support and Love Via Education International
£500,000 – £5 Million	The Forever Project	Beth Shalom Ltd – trading as 'The National Holocaust Centre and Museum'
£5 – £50 Million	Royal Trinity Hospice: A Trinity story	Royal Trinity Hospice
Over £50 Million	Memory Walk 2016	Alzheimer’s Society
Longform	RWD/FWD – The Restorative Justice Council	The Restorative Justice Council

=== 2018 ===
Grand Prix Winners

Category	Prize	Film name	Charity Name
Grand Prix	Film of the Year	The National Autistic Society – Make It Stop (#AutismTMI)	The National Autistic Society
Grand Prix	People’s Choice	Hedgehog Close	British Hedgehog Preservation Society (BHPS)

Category Winners

Category	Film name	Charity Name
Under £10,000	DLD 1-2-3	RADLD (Raising Awareness of Developmental Language Disorder)
£10,000 – £100,000	Mothers' Stories	Heart4More Foundation
£100,000 – £500,000	The Guardians of Leuser	Sumatran Orangutan Society
£500,000 – £5 Million	Suicide Notes Talk Too Late	Movember Foundation
£5 – £50 Million	REACH: help fund more nurses for young people with cancer	Teenage Cancer Trust
Over £50 Million	Made in Britain	Save the Children
Longform under £5 Million	Richmond Park: National Nature Reserve	Friends of Richmond Park
Longform over £5 Million	Prostate Cancer UK Appeal Film	Prostate Cancer UK

=== 2019 ===
Grand Prix Winners

Category	Prize	Film name	Charity Name
Grand Prix	Film of the Year	# One More Minute	Macmillan Cancer Support
Grand Prix	People’s Choice	Kozal's Christmas: a festive tale from Cats Protection	Isha Foundation

Category Winners

Category	Prize	Film name	Charity Name
Longform over £5M	Gold	Inside Childline 360	Childline / NSPCC
	Silver	Why I Chose to Donate my Daughter's Brain	The Brain Tumour Charity
	Bronze	One billion treatments for neglected tropical diseases	Childline / NSPCC
	Gold	The Living Thames	Thames Estuary Partnership
	Silver	Island of Grief	WAY Widowed and Young
	Silver	Dance Beats Cancer	Youth Cancer Trust
	Bronze	Grief as a Teenager	Tynedale Hospice at Home
Over £50M	Gold	Stars	RSPCA
	Silver	Carl's Story	Change Grow Live
	Silver	Strawberry Field Liverpool: The Story Behind the Song	The Salvation Army
	Bronze	Touchline Tactics	ActionAid UK
	Highly commended	Somebody I used to know: Wendy Mitchell	Alzheimer's Society
£5–£50M	Gold	Booberang breast check	Breast Cancer Care
	Silver	Escape Robot	War Child
	Bronze	Patrick's Privilege	Help for Heroes
	Highly commended	Pillow Fight	The IET
£500K–£5M	Gold	# One More Minute	Child Bereavement UK
	Silver	We Are Chickenshed	Chickenshed
	Silver	5 years through the eyes of a mum.	Macular Society
	Bronze	A story of hope	Keys of Change CIO
£100K–£500K	Gold	The Grasvenor Project – #RoleModels	The Grasvenor Project
	Silver	What does AngelmanUK mean to you?	AngelmanUK
	Bronze	Educating the Future	COINS Foundation & PEAS (Promoting Equality in African Schools)
£10K–£100K	Gold	The FAB Gift of Life – To educate children on the subject of Organ donation	Believe – Organ Donor Support
	Silver	20 Men 1 Question	HUMEN
	Bronze	Hyperemesis Gravidarum is definitely not Morning Sickness – Animation	Pregnancy Sickness Support
Under £10K	Gold	The Mouse	Voicing CSA (Child Sexual Abuse)
	Silver	Sponsoring kindness	Sunshine People
	Bronze	Welcome to Woodlands School	Woodlands School Charitable Trust

=== 2020 ===
==== Grand Prix Winners ====
Category	Prize	Film name	Charity Name
Film of the Year	Grand Prix	Two sides of the story	Carers UK
People’s Choice	Grand Prix	Dear Humans	Compassion in World Farming
People’s Choice	Silver	Born Free – The Bitter Bond	The Born Free Foundation

==== Category Winners ====
Category	Prize	Film name	Charity Name
Under £10,000	Gold	We are Sunshine People	Sunshine People
	Silver	The Silent Pain	The Saleem Foundation
	Bronze	The Keys to Life Choir	Keys to Life Choir
£10,000 – £100,000	Gold	The Evolution of Testicles	Male Cancer Awareness Campaign
	Silver	Centenary Film	Twickenham & Thames Valley Beekeepers Association
	Silver	MEN2B and ME: Ethan (his own words)	Association for Multiple Endocrine Neoplasia Disorders (AMEND)
	Bronze	Walk My Journey	Theatre in the Quarter
£100,000 – £500,000	Gold	This is Scotland. Finding the resources to give the future the wild Scotland it deserves.	Scottish Environment LINK
	Silver	Just two hours of your time – Family Friends	Family Friends
	Bronze	Our Hero – Shahid Afridi!	Shahid Afridi Foundation
£500,000 – £5 Million	Gold	Killed by plastic pollution: unknown animal washes up on Cornwall beach. #TheCreature	Surfers Against Sewage
	Silver	Grab Life By	CoppaFeel!
	Silver	Support children's literacy with Doorstep Library #WordsTakeYouPlaces	Doorstep Library
	Bronze	Edible Playgrounds	Trees for Cities
	Bronze	Who says disabled people aren't competitive?	Activity Alliance
£5 – £20 Million	Gold	Born Free – The Bitter Bond	The Born Free Foundation
	Silver	#StillMe; My body after cancer	Teenage Cancer Trust
	Bronze	When I Grow Up	Brighton Housing Trust
£20 – £50 Million	Gold	Ken's Story – Blind Veterans UK	Blind Veterans UK
	Silver	Rebuilding Lives	Stroke Association
	Bronze	#ShareTheOrange	Alzheimer's Research UK
£50 – £100 Million	Gold	See the Potential	St Mungo's
	Silver	Without You	Anthony Nolan
	Bronze	Peaky Bleeders	WaterAid
Over £100 Million	Gold	It Starts With Your Heart	British Heart Foundation
	Silver	Barnardos: Believe in Me, Hyena	Barnardo's
	Silver	How we support the Armed Forces community through lifelong challenges	The Royal British Legion
	Bronze	Stop Starving Yemen	Oxfam GB
	Bronze	Mal's Story	National Trust
Longform under £5 Million	Gold	Life Growing Up	CHIVA
	Silver	Hibo's Story	SafeHands
	Silver	#Reconnect	Scotty's Little Soldiers
	Bronze	Grief Encounter 15th Anniversary Appeal Film	Grief Encounter
Longform over £5 Million	Gold	ShelterBox – Kunyumba – The story of home	ShelterBox
	Silver	Passage – Capturing the Spirit of Tintagel Castle	English Heritage
	Bronze	How We Care	St Peter's Hospice
Corporate Cause – People	Gold	Diversish	Valuable 500
	Silver	School of Dreams	Domestos + Unicef
	Bronze	I'm Fine	Dove + Cartoon Network
Corporate Cause – Planet	Gold	Rang-tan	Iceland
	Silver	Code Zero	King of Shaves
	Bronze	Schools to Market	Planet Whole Kids Foundation + School Food Matters

=== 2022 ===
==== Grand Prix Winners ====
Category	Prize	Film name	Charity Name
Grand Prix	Film of the Year	Whatever It Takes	Macmillan Cancer Support
Grand Prix	People’s Choice	Cauvery Calling – A Race To Save a River	Isha Foundation

==== Category Winners ====
Category	Prize	Film name	Charity Name
Longform under £5M	Gold	Behind Doors	Safenet Domestic Abuse And Support Services Ltd
	Silver	Meet our Crohn's and Colitis Cats	Crohn's & Colitis UK
	Bronze	A Hero's Legacy	Scotty's Little Soldiers
Longform £5–£20M	Gold	It's All Connected	The Cornwall Trust For Nature Conservation
	Silver	Jack's Story	Action Medical Research
	Bronze	What Do We See?	Thomas Pocklington Trust
Longform £20M+	Gold	Rigged: A Workers' Story	Greenpeace UK
	Silver	Marisela the Forest Protector	WWF - UK
	Bronze	Trachoma is Eliminated in The Gambia	Sightsavers
£0–£100K	Gold	Rare Strikes Back	Timothy Syndrome Alliance (TSA)
	Bronze	Can Music Change The World?	Keys of Change CIO
£100–£500K	Gold	Evie’s Story	The Paperweight Trust
	Silver	The Perfect Ice Cream	Our Time
	Bronze	Evie’s Story	Scottish Cot Death Trust
£500K–£5M	Gold	Thank You Sea	Surfers Against Sewage
	Gold	Baggage	Swindon Carers Centre
	Silver	ASMR - The Relaxing Sound of Rain	Simon Community
	Bronze	Darkness And Light	Beth Shalom
£5–£20M	Gold	#NotOk: Cancer and Young People’s Mental Health	Teenage Cancer Trust
	Silver	Mission Critical Exhibition	Midlands Air Ambulance Charity
	Bronze	International Working Animal Day 2020	SPANA
£20–£50M	Gold	What Made Me?	The Scout Association
	Silver	The Painful Truth	Versus Arthritis
	Bronze	Tech Abuse Animation	Refuge
£50–£100M	Gold	Fight for Home	Shelter
	Silver	Home for Christmas	Great Ormond Street Hospital Children’s Charity
	Bronze	Simon’s Story	Bridgend Samaritans
£100M+	Gold	A Message from Students in Sierra Leone	Sightsavers
	Silver	The Ad We Never Expected to Make	British Heart Foundation
	Bronze	Adapting to Change	The Salvation Army
Corporate Cause	Gold	It's Time to Rise Up	Toast Ale
	Silver	Donating 50% of Profits to Charity	Elvis & Kresse
	Bronze	There is Always Hope	Network Rail

==== People’s Choice Winners ====
Category	Status	Organisation	Film name
Longform under £5M	Winner	Crohn's & Colitis UK	Meet our Crohn's and Colitis Cats
	Silver	Cauda Equina Champions Charity	24 Hours Changed My Life – Forever
	Bronze	Scotty's Little Soldiers	A Hero's Legacy
Longform £5–£20M	Winner	JDRF	Diary Extract from Frederick Banting
	Silver	Action Medical Research	Jack's Story
	Bronze	Thomas Pocklington Trust	What Do We See?
Longform £20M+	Winner	Teach First	Class of 2020: Ep.4 "Representation"
	Silver	Greenpeace UK	Rigged: A Workers' Story
	Bronze	Sightsavers	Trachoma is Eliminated in The Gambia
£0–£100K	Winner	The PDA Society	What is PDA?
	Silver	Bumba Foundation	We Will Grow
	Bronze	AMEND	Surgery: Claudia’s Story
£100–£500K	Winner	Border Collie Trust GB	Someone You Loved
	Silver	The Paperweight Trust	Pandemic Pressures
	Bronze	Dravet Syndrome UK	Every Family Counts
£500K–£5M	Winner	International Animal Rescue	Break the Cage
	Silver	Monkey Haven	The Story of Monkey Haven
	Bronze	Child Bereavement UK	The Invisible Suitcase
£5–£20M	Winner	SPANA	International Working Animal Day 2020
	Silver	Redwings Horse Sanctuary	A Second Chance for Boo
	Bronze	Midlands Air Ambulance Charity	Mission Critical Exhibition
£20–£50M	Winner	MS Society	Join Team Stop MS
	Silver	Priors Court	Geoff and Shaun’s Story
	Bronze	Versus Arthritis	The Painful Truth
£50–£100M	Winner	Woodland Trust	Scotland’s Rainforest
	Silver	Anthony Nolan	Letters of Hope
	Bronze	Cats Protection	Casper’s Magical Journey
£100M+	Winner	RSPCA	Cancel out Cruelty
	Silver	Action for Children	End Childhood Crisis
	Bronze	Alzheimer’s Society	One Month with Dementia
Corporate Cause	Winner	Teachappy Ltd	Can School Make You Happier?
	Silver	School Food Matters / NatWest	Young Marketeers – Market Trader Training
	Bronze	Share Gratitude	The Seven Wonders of Gratitude

=== 2023 ===
==== Grand Prix Winners ====
Category	Prize	Film name	Charity Name
Grand Prix	Film of the Year	Wales is a Nation of Sanctuary	Welsh Refugee Council
Grand Prix	People’s Choice	Unbreakable Bonds	Brooke Action for Working Horses and Donkeys

==== Category Winners ====
Category	Prize	Film name	Charity Name
Under £100,000	Winner	The Ones Who Care	We Care Campaign
	Silver	BUD	MindFood CIO
	Bronze	Books are not just about reading	Book Clubs in Schools
£100,000-£350,000	Winner	Harry Kane: Resilience	Harry Kane Foundation
	Silver	Carney's Community	Carney's Community
	Bronze	Men, You Are Not Alone	Mankind Initiative
£350,000-£1 million	Winner	The Travel Buddy Scheme	My Life My Choice
	Silver	Luke’s Legacy	Solving Kids' Cancer UK
	Bronze	What does STRONG mean to you?	Kidscape with Giants Live
£1-£2 million	Winner	The Hand That Helps	Young Westminster Foundation
	Silver	Finding Home	Children and Families Across Borders
	Bronze	Care4Calais - Safe Passage	Care4Calais
£2-£5 million	Winner	Walk for Water	charity: water
	Silver	Puddle Jumping	Child Bereavement UK
	Bronze	Car wash	Justice and Care
£5-20 million	Winner	Marc's Story	Martlets
	Silver	I live with dementia	Dementia UK
	Bronze	When I Grow Up - Eve's Story	Children with Cancer UK
£20-50 million	Winner	Let's Get Real About Recycling	WRAP Recycle Now
	Silver	Real Talk	Breast Cancer Now
	Bronze	Taking control of rising energy costs - John's Story	Groundwork UK
£50-100 million	Winner	Cell Street Repeat at Christmas	Nacro
	Silver	We Are Open	Jewish Care
	Bronze	The Drive	Shelter
£100 million plus	Winner	The Big IF	Barnardo's
	Silver	A Celebration of Girls' Rights	Save the Children UK

==== People’s Choice Winners ====
Category	Prize	Film name	Charity Name
Under £100,000	Gold	Watch Us Grow	Friends Of Kirkby Fleetham CE Primary School
	Silver	What we are about	T-21 Charity
	Bronze	Benjamin and Eiras Story	Save a Kill Shelter Dog
£100,000-£350,000	Gold	Birth during lockdown	Pregnant Then Screwed
	Silver	Bly's Story	Brighton Table Tennis Club
	Bronze	My Life in Foster Care	Their Future Today
£350,000-£1 million	Gold	Me & My Stammer	Action for Stammering Children
	Silver	We Ride Together	Wheels For All
	Bronze	The Ripple Effect	Survivors of Bereavement by Suicide
£1-2 million	Gold	Raising Awareness in the Farming Community	UK Sepsis Trust
	Silver	The Listening Place - Volunteers	The Listening Place
	Bronze	Community Transport promotional video	Waverley Hoppa Community Transport
£2-5 million	Gold	No Bear Left Behind	Animals Asia
	Silver	Stay with us	Great Western Air Ambulance Charity
	Bronze	#ValueOurLove	Kinship
£5-20 million	Gold	International Working Animal Day 2022	SPANA
	Silver	Dying Matters at Havens Hospices	Havens Hospices
	Bronze	I live with dementia	Dementia UK
£20-50 million	Gold	Autism, the performing arts and Jamie	Prior's Court
	Silver	Break the silence	Samaritans
	Bronze	Barts 900	Barts Charity
£50-100 million	Gold	One little boy’s lifesaving legacy	Anthony Nolan
	Silver	The Fight for Mental Health	MIND
	Bronze	Cell Street Repeat at Christmas	Nacro
£100 million plus	Gold	Our Story	Canal & River Trust
	Silver	The gift	RSPCA (England & Wales)
	Bronze	A bedtime story	RNLI
Longform Under £350,000	Gold	Streets2Homes	Streets2Homes
	Silver	Tackling PTSD Carp Fishing	Phoenix Heroes CIC
	Bronze	Make yourself at home	Withington Walls
Longform £350,000-£5 million	Gold	Out of Darkness	Grief Encounter
	Silver	Do It For Her	YGAM
	Bronze	Phil's epilepsy story	Epilepsy Scotland
Longform £5-20 million	Gold	Feeding Humanity One Meal At A Time	Khalsa Aid International
	Silver	The Block	Cash for Kids
	Bronze	Anyone. Anywhere. Anytime	Mountbatten Isle of Wight
Longform £20 million plus	Gold	Parkinson's, DBS and Me - Decision Day	Parkinson's UK
	Silver	Ray & Mariel	Alzheimer’s Research UK
	Bronze	Perfect Storm	East Africa Food Crisis

=== 2024 ===
==== Grand Prix Winners ====
Category	Prize	Film name	Charity Name
Grand Prix	Film of the Year	Change The Ending by Alzheimer's Research UK	Alzheimer’s Research UK
Grand Prix	People’s Choice	Together	RSPCA (England & Wales)

==== Category Winners ====
Category	Prize	Film name	Charity Name
Under £100,000	Winner	One More Day by Menfulness	Menfulness
	Silver	What is organ donation? by We Are Donors	We Are Donors
	Bronze	Volunteering with RefYouMe by Q Content	RefYouMe
£100,000-£250,000	Winner	HostNation: Friends in Deed by Media Trust Films	Hostnation
	Silver	A Small Act by Small Acts of Kindness Trust	Small Acts Of Kindness Trust
	Bronze	About Hostage International by Hostage International	Hostage International
£250,000-£450,000	Winner	Synergy Theatre Project by Media Trust Films	Synergy Theatre
	Silver	Star Scheme - ACEs by Skylark Media	Star Scheme
	Bronze	National Orchestras for All... by Orchestras for All	Orchestras For All
£450,000-£1 Million	Winner	An Introduction to Hull & East Yorkshire...	Hull And East Yorkshire Children's University
	Silver	Dads Struggle Too by Acacia Family Support	Acacia Family Support
	Bronze	Daisy's story by The Elizabeth Foundation	The Elizabeth Foundation
£1-2.5 Million	Winner	"Just a Period" by Lark	Wellbeing Of Women
	Silver	Breaking the Cycle by Pump Aid	Pump Aid
	Bronze	Why Spot Leukaemia? by Faltrego	Spot Leukaemia
£2.5-5 Million	Winner	The Chest Checklist by CoppaFeel!	CoppaFeel!
	Silver	Mental Health Awareness Week by Racing Welfare	Racing Welfare
	Bronze	Grow Your Wings by Staying Put	Staying Put
£5-15 Million	Winner	Enough is Enough by Born Free	Born Free
	Silver	The Cost of Living Crisis by UK Youth	UK Youth
	Bronze	Stigma is more harmful than HIV by THT	Terrence Higgins Trust
£15-50 Million	Winner	The Cost of Breathing Crisis by Scope	Scope
	Silver	Let Me Be Me by North East Autism Society	North East Autism Society
	Bronze	A ShelterBox story with Imelda Staunton	Shelterbox
Over £50 Million		Age UK. Know what to do.	Age UK
		Childline is a lifeline by Open Creates	NSPCC
		Good Death by CPB London	Marie Curie
Longform < £100,000	Winner	A Rare Find by UK LSD Collaborative	UK Lsd Collaborative
	Silver	Cycle of Change by Menopause Support CIC	Menopause Support Cic
	Bronze	GoodHabitz Documentaries by The New Normal	The New Normal Charity
Longform £100K–£1M	Winner	One Day... by Graeme Montgomery	Landworks
	Silver	Love Bomb by Integrate UK	Integrate UK
	Bronze	Josh's Story	R;pple Suicide Prevention
Longform £1–10M	Winner	Don't Stop by Greenpeace UK	Greenpeace UK
	Silver	No Family Alone by Rainbow Trust	Rainbow Trust Children's Charity
	Bronze	SHOCKA: A story	Mind In Haringey
Longform > £10M	Winner	Four Beats by Hogarth Worldwide	London's Air Ambulance Charity
	Silver	Save Our Wild Isles by WWF/RSPB/NT	Wwf (Save Our Wild Isles Partnership)
	Bronze	Transforming Treatments	Kidney Research Uk
International Impact	Winner	Protecting Children since 1999	World Childhood Foundation Usa
	Silver	Daylight	Lebone Village
	Bronze	Woman. Life. Freedom.	Equality Now
Corporate Cause	Winner	#YouAreNotAlone	Norwich City Football Club
	Silver	The Invincible Summer	The Skateroom
	Bronze	Shaking Hands with the Devil	LSVT Global

==== People’s Choice Awards ====
Category	Prize	Film name	Charity Name
Under £100,000	Winner	Meet Helen And Jessica	Pans Pandas UK
	Silver	Trip To Paradise Park 2023	London Taxi Drivers Charity For Children
	Bronze	Arts For All	Arts For All
£100,000 – £250,000	Winner	Oya – It Takes A Community	Oya Organisation Of Young Africans
	Silver	Broken Pieces	One In Four
	Bronze	Scottish Co-Operative Women’s Guild	Kairos Women+
£250,000 – £450,000	Winner	Rudy The Cat	Shropshire Cat Rescue
	Silver	Enter The Fold	Fulham Good Neighbours
	Bronze	The Big Shark Pledge	Shark Trust
£450,000 – £1 Million	Winner	Unbound The Greyhound	Onekind
	Silver	Daisy's Story	The Elizabeth Foundation
	Bronze	Cancer Looks Like This	Planets Cancer Charity
£1 – 2.5 Million	Winner	Lymphoma Symptoms	Lymphoma Action
	Silver	Wish I Could Wish You...	Winston's Wish
	Bronze	Someone Like Me	Future First
£2.5 – 5 Million	Winner	Remembering Someone Special	Child Bereavement UK
	Silver	A Song For Wmwa	West Mercia Women's Aid
	Bronze	The Power Of A Solar Light	Solaraid
£5 – 15 Million	Winner	James' Story	Hampshire And Isle Of Wight Air Ambulance
	Silver	Elijah's Story	Havens Hospices
	Bronze	Enough Is Enough	Born Free
£15 – 50 Million	Winner	Lulu: Forever 19	Teenage Cancer Trust
	Silver	Let Me Be Me	North East Autism Society
	Bronze	You Don't See Cf	Cystic Fibrosis Trust
Over £50 Million	Winner	Ava And Mr Biggles	Cats Protection
	Silver	Hidden Barriers	Shelter
	Bronze	The Cost Of Loving	PDSA
Longform < £100,000	Winner	Courage	Consortium For The Prevention Of Suicide
	Silver	Speak Their Name	Quinn's Retreat
	Bronze	Baton Of Hope UK	Baton Of Hope
Longform £100k – £1m	Winner	Global Blood Heroes	The Who Is Hussain Foundation
	Silver	Test For Uganda Students	Test For Africa
	Bronze	Emmaus North West	Emmaus Preston
Longform £1 – 10m	Winner	The Reunion	Home-Start UK
	Silver	It Must Be Love – The Kirkwood Chorus	The Kirkwood
	Bronze	Paddy’s Story	Action Medical Research
Longform > £10m	Winner	Lukas’ Story	Ronald McDonald House Charities UK
	Silver	Alison & Frank	Alzheimer’s Research UK

=== 2025 ===
==== Grand Prix Winners ====
Category	Prize	Film name	Charity Name
Grand Prix	Film of the Year	The Littlest Hoglet	British Hedgehog Preservation Society
Grand Prix	People’s Choice	Make the World a Refuge	Refuge

==== Category Winners ====
Category	Prize	Film name	Charity Name
Under £100,000	Winner	Foundation launch film	The Rural Communities Mental Health Foundation
	Silver	Give...A Few Words	Give...A Few Words CIC
	Bronze	St Albans Community Pantry	St Albans Community Pantry
£100,000–£250,000	Winner	FairChecks	Transform Justice
	Silver	Discover Ealing Anchor	Ealing Anchor Foundation
	Bronze	Ollie and Amelia - The Sandcastle Trust Christmas Appeal	The Sandcastle Trust
£250,000–£500,000	Winner	Don't Be A Harold	Transform Drug Policy Foundation
	Silver	Solace and Connection Through Reading	Give A Book
	Bronze	Does That Make Me A Woman?	Women + Health
£500,000–£1million	Winner	Draw Our Future	Orangutan Foundation
	Silver	Migraine hurts	The Migraine Trust
	Bronze	Acceptance	Electric Umbrella
£1–£2.5million	Winner	Our World, 2030	Autistica
	Silver	An Ode to Youth Work	Young Camden Foundation
	Bronze	Save A Life From Suicide	Body & Soul
£2.5–£5million	Winner	This Counts as Care	Carers UK
	Silver	Beyond the Shadows	Unseen UK
	Bronze	Many Doors - Safe Space Winter Appeal	Providence Row
£5–£15million	Winner	Sh*t Beach	Friends of the Earth
	Silver	Act FAST	Know the symptoms of stroke, every second counts
	Bronze	The Real Difference	Whizz Kidz
£15–£50million	Winner	Don't Hold Back	Scope
	Silver	Requesting Backup	SSAFA
	Bronze	Without Mountbatten	Mountbatten Isle of Wight
Over £50million	Winner	Dementia: Behind Closed Doors	Alzheimer's Society
	Silver	Improving eye care facilities in Karamoja, Uganda	Sightsavers
	Bronze	The Butterfly	Waythrough
Longform Under £500,000	Winner	If Not Now, When?	Younger People With Dementia
	Silver	Safe With me	MyLife Productions 2013 CIC
	Bronze	Olly's Light Travels	Olly's Future
Longform £500,000–£5million	Winner	Windrush Cymru @ 75	Race Council Cymru
	Silver	Care & Loss	METRO Charity
	Bronze	The Magic of Chaos	Headway East London
Longform Over £5million	Winner	Recovering the Rainforest	The Woodland Trust
	Silver	The Gamble of Youth	GamCare
	Bronze	Pups to Partnerships - A Guide Dogs documentary	The Guide Dogs for the Blind Association
Corporate Cause	Winner	StreetVet	Purina UK&I
	Silver	Lighthouse Women's Aid	Suffolk Building Society
	Bronze	Toad Watch	Zero Hour
The Bicester Collection for International Impact	Winner	Kindness	Pebbles Project
	Silver	#WeAreWalkingWithYou (Over Her Shoulder)	This Life Cambodia
	Bronze	L'ENVOL 2023 retrospective video : Charity Film Awards 2024	L'ENVOL

=== People’s Choice Awards ===
Category	Prize	Film name	Charity Name
Under £100,000	Winner	Billy's Story - Animated	Billy & Beyond
	Silver	Power of Polo	Power of Polo
	Bronze	Morabe Rural Music Showreel	Morabe Rural Music
£100,000–£250,000	Winner	Ollie and Amelia - The Sandcastle Trust Christmas Appeal	The Sandcastle Trust
	Silver	Our Kids First	Our Kids First
	Bronze	2 Hours	JE Delve
£250,000–£500,000	Winner	The Human Animal Bond Matters To Us	Shropshire Cat Rescue
	Silver	Amy's Story	Simon on the Streets
	Bronze	Speak Up	Team Oasis Children's Charity + Liverpool & Merseyside Samaritans
£500,000–£1million	Winner	The future of Gurkha heritage - गोर्खा सम्पदाको भविष्य देखाउने फिल्म	The Gurkha Museum Trust
	Silver	Acceptance	Electric Umbrella
	Bronze	Migraine hurts	The Migraine Trust
£1–£2.5million	Winner	Meet Oscar and Ella	The Elizabeth Foundation
	Silver	Losing a loved one to epilepsy: Hart family shares Graeme’s story	Epilepsy Scotland
	Bronze	Ada's Story	Roald Dahl's Marvellous Children's Charity
£2.5–£5million	Winner	#ThisIsKinshipCare	Kinship
	Silver	Bobby's Wizzybug Wheelchair Story	Designability
	Bronze	LUKE	Rainbow Trust Children's Charity
£5–£15million	Winner	What a cure feels like	Breakthrough T1D
	Silver	Its not about counting the days, its about making every day count	Havens Hospices
	Bronze	Cut the Crap- No more excuses	Crohn's and Colitis UK
£15–£50million	Winner	Brooke at 90	Brooke Action for Working Horses and Donkeys
	Silver	Without Mountbatten	Mountbatten Isle of Wight
	Bronze	Autism from the Inside	North East Autism Society
Over £50million	Winner	Here for every cats journey	Cats Protection
	Silver	Silver Medal Rescue: How Penlee lifeboat crew saved 8 lives in a storm	RNLI
	Bronze	Christopher's Story	Action for Children
Longform Under £500,000	Winner	Connections	Timothy Syndrome Alliance - TSA
	Silver	In his Slipstream	Blue Spirit
	Bronze	Facing the Impact	Restorative Justice Council
Longform £500,000–£5million	Winner	Stop Killing Our Rivers	Soil Association
	Silver	The Wilson's Story	Daisy's Dream
	Bronze	Love to Balance	Saracens Sport Foundation
Longform Over £5million	Winner	Michael's Story	Hampshire & Isle of Wight Air Ambulance
	Silver	Equal World?	Sightsavers
	Bronze	The Little Things	Derian House Children’s Hospice
The Bicester Collection for International Impact	Winner	Four Paws	Be Their Voice
	Silver	Kinder Paradise	KINDER PARADISE (MEDAASE PA SONG)
	Bronze	Klitschko Foundation - Play For Equality: How to Make the dream about quality come true	Klitschko Foundation
