= Anne-Lise Gabold =

Danish actress (born 1941)

- Born: Anne-Lise Rosberg; 5 October 1941 (age 84); Denmark
- Occupations: Actress, director, teacher
- Years active: 1968–
- Spouse: Ingolf Gabold (divorced)

Anne-Lise Gabold (née Rosberg; born 5 October 1941) is a Danish actress, director, and teacher.

== Career ==
Gabold has received two Bodil Awards during her career. In 1970, she received the award for best leading actress for her role in Jazz All Around, playing the role of Vera Bagger. Several years later in 1976, she received her second award for best supporting actress for her role as Sylvie in A Happy Divorce.

Gabold has been credited for introducing the Suzuki method of acting into Denmark, after having traveled to Japan and studied under theater theorist Tadashi Suzuki. She later received an award in 1999 from the International Theatre Institute for her role in introducing the method to Denmark, and the rest of Scandinavia.

== Personal life ==
Gabold was previously married to composer Ingolf Gabold and the two had a daughter, Louise Gabold, who is also an actress. She later married director Horacio Munoz Orellana, with whom she had her second child. Additionally, she has three grandchildren.

She graduated from the Royal Danish Theatre's school in 1969.

== Sources ==
- Hammer, Tad (1991). International Film Prizes: An Encyclopedia. New York: Garland. ISBN 978-0-8240-7099-1. OCLC 23176959.
- Piil, M. (2000). Gyldendals filmguide: Danske film fra A til Z (in Danish). Copenhagen, Denmark: Gyldendal. ISBN 978-87-00-47806-0. OCLC 47051997.
