= The Bachelor (1990 film) =

- Italian theatrical release poster
- Italian: Mio caro dottor Gräsler
- Directed by: Roberto Faenza
- Screenplay by: Roberto Faenza; Ennio De Concini
- Based on: Dr. Gräsler, Badearzt by Arthur Schnitzler
- Produced by: Mario Orfini
- Starring: Keith Carradine; Miranda Richardson; Kristin Scott Thomas; Sarah-Jane Fenton; Mari Törőcsik; Franco Diogene; Mario Adorf; Max von Sydow
- Cinematography: Giuseppe Rotunno
- Edited by: Claudio Cutry
- Music by: Ennio Morricone
- Production companies: Eidoscope International; Mediapark Budapest
- Distributed by: Titanus Distribuzione
- Release date: 30 March 1990 (Italy)
- Running time: 105 minutes
- Countries: Italy; Hungary
- Language: English
- Budget: $7.6 million
- Box office: $252,000 (Italy)

The Bachelor (Italian: Mio caro dottor Gräsler) is a 1990 English-language historical drama film directed by Roberto Faenza, based on the novel Dr. Gräsler, Badearzt by Arthur Schnitzler. It stars Keith Carradine, Miranda Richardson, Kristin Scott Thomas and Sarah-Jane Fenton. Set in the Austro-Hungarian Empire before the First World War, the film follows Doctor Emil Gräsler, a distinguished physician who is forced to choose between two women he loves.

== Cast ==
- Keith Carradine as Doctor Emil Gräsler
- Miranda Richardson as Frederica / Widow
- Kristin Scott Thomas as Sabine
- Sarah-Jane Fenton as Katerina
- Mari Törőcsik as Mrs. von Schleheim
- Mario Adorf as L'amico di Gräsler
- Max von Sydow as Von Schleheim
- Franco Diogene as Hotel Owner
