= Istanbul Animation Festival =

Coordinates: 39°55′N 32°51′E

- Established: 2003
- Founded by: Efe Efeoglu
- Hosted by: Alternatif Akım

Istanbul Animation Festival (Turkish: İstanbul Animasyon Festivali) is a festival of animated films founded in 2003 and held annually in November. Festival Director and Founder is Efe Efeoglu. The festival is organised by Alternatif Akım.

== Past Years ==
4th İstanbul Animation Festival

Price Winners

IAF Grand Price: John and Karen - Matthew Walker
Turkish Short: Akvaryum - Denizcan Yüzgül
Student Film: 458 nm - Jan Bitzer, Ilja Brunk, Tom Weber
First Film: Fetch - Steve Townrow
First Film: Cable - Remi Gamiette
Music Video: Last Time in Clerkeuwell - Alex Budovsky
Advertisement: Nike Fitness - Lobo
Motion Graphic: 8.1 - Deva Van Guylenborg
Jury Special prize: Don't Let It All Unravel - Sarah Cox

3rd İstanbul Animation Festival

Price Winners in Professional Branch

IAF Grand Price: Mind The Gap! - Anastasia Zhuravleva
Best 3D Animation: Stars - Eoghan Kidney
Best 2D Animation: Simone - Aksel Zeydan Göz
Best Visual Effect: Stars - Eoghan Kidney
Best Sound: Stars - Eoghan Kidney
Jury Special prizes:
Carnivore Reflux - Eddie White & James Calver
Islwyn Ogwyn - Jem Roberts

Prize Winners in Amateur Branch

IAF Grand Price: Mind The Gap! - Anastasia Zhuravleva
Best 3D Animation: Hallucii - Goo-Shun Wang
Best 2D Animation: 'Cuz - Emmanuelle Walker
Best Visual Effect: Sperm - Deniz Kader
Best Sound: Mind The Gap! - Anastasia Zhuravleva
Jury Special prizes:
Gazap - Murat Kirişçi
Mavi Kuş - Mustafa Ercan Zırh

2nd İstanbul Animation Festival

Prize Winners in Professional Branch

IAF Grand Price: Yetenikli Bay Köksal - Cenk Köksal
Best 3D Animation: Hand, Gun, Rock, WC - Aslan Elver
Best 2D Animation: Yetenikli Bay Köksal - Cenk Köksal
Best Picture: Foreverlove 2 - Nebi Yıkaroğlu
Best Visual Effect: Dalgalanan Korsan Bayrağı - Burak Özdelice
Best Sound: Dalgalanan Korsan Bayrağı, Kış Gibi - Burak Özdelice
Best Advertisement: Çelik - Anima
Jury Special prizes:
3digital - Gürkan Yılmaz
Foreverlove - Nebi Yıkaroğlu

Prize Winners in Amateur Branch

IAF Grand Price: Rasyonalite ya da Yüzyılın Yazgısı - Emir Benderlioğlu
Best 3D Animation: Caveman - Tuğhan Arslan, Dağhan Demirtaş
Best 2D Animation: Oyun Bitti - Yücel Çavdar
Best Picture: Temas - Erman Manyaslı
Best Visual Effect: Kopi - Ahmet Sönmez
Best Sound: Tangram - Şahin Özbay
Jury Special prizes:
Denizcan Yüzgül
Cem Başak

1st İstanbul Animation Festival

Prize Winners

First: Garden of Love - Onur Yeldan
Second: Ronk and Bird - Arslan Elver
Third: RobotX - Ömer Tatlısöz
