= Ingolf Gabold =

Danish composer (1942–2025)

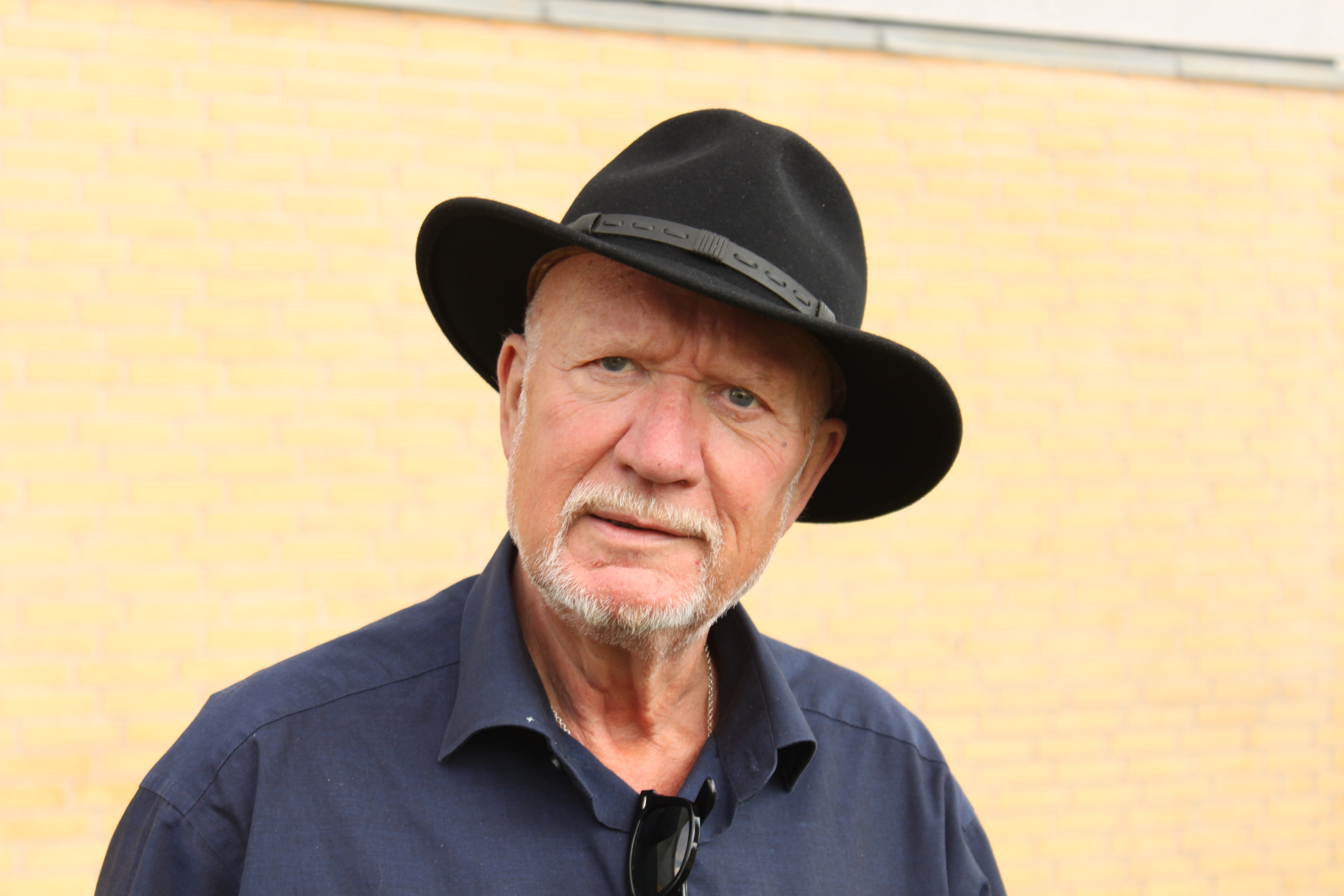
- Gabold in July 2010
- Born: Ingolf Georg August Gabold; 31 March 1942; Heidelberg, Germany
- Died: 1 May 2025 (aged 83)
- Education: Royal Danish Academy of Music
- Occupation: Composer
- Spouse: Anne-Lise Gabold (divorced)

Ingolf Georg August Gabold (31 March 1942 – 1 May 2025) was a Danish composer. He last worked as the drama manager for DR, the Danish national broadcaster, from 1996 until 2012.

On 10 January 2003, Gabold became a Knight of the Dannebrog.

== Personal life ==
Gabold had previously been married to actress Anne-Lise Gabold, with whom he had one child. He also had two other children with his second wife, Kikke Hagen.
