= Mariken van Nieumeghen (1974 film) =

1974 film

- Film poster
- Directed by: Jos Stelling
- Written by: Jos Stelling
- Produced by: Rob du Mee; Jos Stelling
- Starring: Eric Bais
- Cinematography: Ernest Bresser
- Edited by: Jan Bosdriesz; Emmy Vis
- Release date: 19 December 1974
- Running time: 80 minutes
- Country: Netherlands
- Language: Dutch

Mariken van Nieumeghen is a 1974 Dutch drama film directed by Jos Stelling. It is based on the 16th-century text Mariken van Nieumeghen. It was entered into the 1975 Cannes Film Festival.

== Cast ==
- Ronnie Montagne as Mariken
- Eric Bais as Gast in herberg
- Sander Bais as Moenen
- Kees Bakker as Bedelaar
- Jacqueline Bayer as Meisje
- Harm Begeman as Wagenspeler
- Kitty Courbois as (voice)
- Riek Deege as Wasvrouw
- Henk Douze as Wagenspeler
- Jan Harms as Aanrander
- Dirk Hattum as Wagenspeler
- Wil Hildebrand as Dede
- Frans Hulshof as Waard
- Carel Jansen as Wagenspeler
- Menno Jetten as Aanrander
- Leo Koenen as Kleermaker
- Johanna Leeuwenstein as Wasvrouw

== Production ==
Cast and crew consisted of amateurs. As most of them had daytime jobs, the film was mostly shot over weekends. Ronnie Montagne, who had studied pedagogy, played Mariken. The one-eyed Moenen was played by Arielle Bailleux, a young physicist. After shooting this film they both went to the United States to complete their doctorate degrees at Stanford University, California, and never acted again.
