= Ripple Suicide Prevention =

UK suicide prevention charity

- Formation: 2021
- Founder: Alice Hendy
- Type: Charity
- Registration no.: Charity No. 1194331
- Legal status: Registered charity
- Headquarters: United Kingdom
- Region served: Worldwide
- Services: Suicide prevention through online search interception
- Website: ripplesuicideprevention.com

Ripple Suicide Prevention is a suicide prevention charity based in the United Kingdom. Founded in 2021 by Alice Hendy, the organisation develops a browser extension and Wi-Fi tool to intercept harmful online searches related to self-harm and suicide. Founded as R;pple Suicide Prevention, the charity later changed its name to Ripple Suicide Prevention.

== History ==
Ripple Suicide Prevention was founded following the death of Hendy's brother, Josh, who died by suicide in November 2020 at the age of 21, after researching methods of self-harm online.

In 2022, Ripple Suicide Prevention partnered with Premier League football club West Ham United. In 2023 the charity hosted a festival to raise awareness of suicide and suicide prevention. During this period, the charity also partnered with the Association of Colleges and Mental Health First Aid.

In 2025, the charity continued its collaboration within sport when partnering with Sussex CCC. Ripple also partnered with the Premier League, launching Together Against Suicide, a nationwide campaign to support fans affected by suicide or suicidal thoughts, developed in partnership with Samaritans and backed by all 20 Premier League clubs. The initiative, unveiled on World Suicide Prevention Day, aimed to raise awareness of available support services. As part of the campaign, the League funded club subscriptions to the Ripple tool.

In the same year, the charity expanded into healthcare sectors where suicide rates are disproportionately high. The charity has also partnered with US-based organisations, including the National Cybersecurity Alliance and the State of Rhode Island.

== NHS and local government ==
Ripple is endorsed and supported by NHS trusts and local government bodies across England. This includes:

- South West Yorkshire Partnership NHS Foundation Trust
- Cambridgeshire and Peterborough NHS Foundation Trust
- Worcestershire County Council
- Norfolk County Council
- North Lincolnshire Council

== Recognition ==
In 2022, Ripple won the Royal Society for Public Health's Public Mental Health and Wellbeing Award for its innovation and scalability in suicide prevention. In 2025, the organisation was recognised by the British Royal Family with the King's Award for Enterprise in the category of Innovation. In 2025, Ripple was again acknowledged by the British Royal Family when joining The Royal Foundation's National Suicide Prevention Network, aiming to transform suicide prevention across the UK.

In 2025, Ripple Suicide Prevention was recognised at the annual Centre for Social Justice awards for its innovative use of technology in suicide prevention. Alice Hendy accepted the award from England manager Gareth Southgate in recognition of the charity’s work. As part of the award, Ripple received funding to further develop its technology and expand its reach.

== Alice Hendy ==
Alice Hendy, founder of the charity, has received significant media coverage and recognition for her role in suicide prevention and mental health campaigning.

In 2021, Hendy received the Entrepreneur of Excellence Award at the National Diversity Awards, recognising her work to promote digital safety and mental health equity. In 2023 she was appointed a Member of the Order of the British Empire (MBE) for services to suicide prevention and in 2025, Hendy was awarded an Honorary Doctorate from the University of Portsmouth.

== Governance and funding ==
Ripple is registered as a charity in England and Wales (Charity No. 1194331). Funding comes from grants, corporate partnerships, and public donations.
