= Hunger (1966 film) =

1966 Danish period drama film by Henning Carlsen

Sult
- Front DVD cover for the film
- Directed by: Henning Carlsen
- Written by: Henning Carlsen; Peter Seeberg
- Based on: Hunger; 1890 novel by Knut Hamsun
- Produced by: Göran Lindgren; Bertil Ohlsson
- Starring: Per Oscarsson; Gunnel Lindblom
- Cinematography: Henning Kristiansen
- Edited by: Henning Carlsen
- Music by: Krzysztof Komeda
- Distributed by: Athena Film
- Release date: 19 August 1966
- Running time: 111 minutes
- Countries: Denmark; Norway; Sweden
- Languages: Danish; Norwegian; Swedish

Hunger (Danish: Sult, Swedish: Svält) is a 1966 Danish period drama film directed by Henning Carlsen and based upon the novel Hunger by Norwegian Nobel Prize-winning author Knut Hamsun. The film starred Swedish actor Per Oscarsson as a starving writer who struggles to find work while wandering the streets of 1890s Oslo. It was the first film produced as a cooperative effort among the three Scandinavian countries.

With its stark focus on a life of poverty and desperation, the film is considered a masterpiece of social realism. Film historians suggest it was the first Danish film to gain serious international attention since the work of Carl Theodor Dreyer. It is one of the ten films listed in Denmark's cultural canon by the Danish Ministry of Culture.

== Plot ==
In 1890 Kristiania (Oslo), an impoverished and lonely writer named Pontus (Per Oscarsson) comes to the city from the country. He stands on a bridge, overlooking running water, writing but clearly starving. He visits a pawnbroker several times. He sells his waistcoat for a few cents, then gives the money to a beggar. Other money that falls into his hands he also gives away. He has written an article that a newspaper editor (Henki Kolstad) agrees to publish if he makes some corrections, but Pontus is too proud to accept an advance when offered, so he leaves elated but still hungry. He begs a bone for his fictitious dog, which he gnaws on secretly in an alley. He often has the chance to make things better for himself, but his pride gets in the way, such as when he declines the much-needed help of a worried friend.

When he is unable to pay his rent, the landlady (Else Heiberg) evicts him. Another landlady shortly does the same. Hunger is constantly overwhelming Pontus and he drifts between hallucination and reality while struggling to survive. He suffers humiliations which lead him to the edge of insanity. He applies for an accounting job but is rejected, and fails a physical exam to be a fireman because he wears glasses. One hallucination revolves around Ylajali (Gunnel Lindblom), an apparently refined woman he has met on the street. Despite their mutual flirtations, nothing ever evolves between them. On a sudden impulse, Pontus takes a job as a crew member on an outbound freighter. His destination is unknown.

== Cast ==
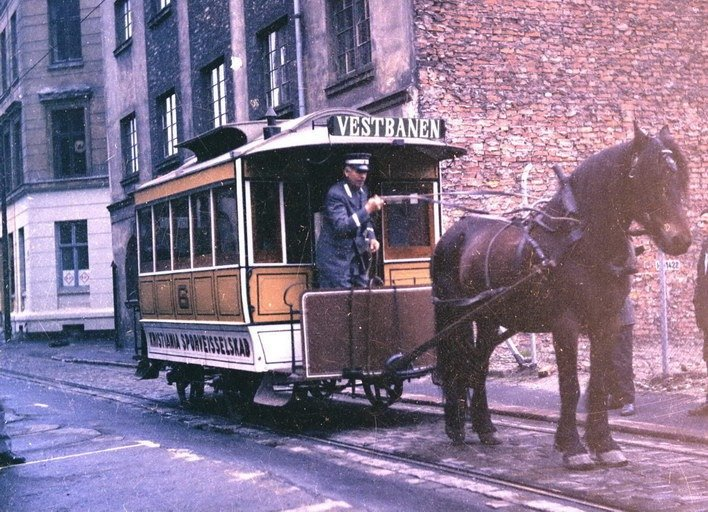
A heritage horsecar of the Oslo Tramway being used during the filming of Hunger

- Per Oscarsson ... Pontus
- Gunnel Lindblom ... Ylajali
- Birgitte Federspiel ... Her sister
- Knud Rex ... Landlord
- Hans W. Petersen ... Grocer
- Henki Kolstad ... Editor
- Roy Bjørnstad ... Konstantin
- Sverre Hansen ... Painter
- Pål Skjønberg ... Constable
- Else Heiberg ... Landlady
- Lise Fjeldstad ... Little girl
- Carl Ottosen ... Sailor
- Osvald Helmuth ... Pawnbroker
- Sigrid Horne-Rasmussen ... Landlady

== Awards ==
The film was nominated for the Palme D'Or and won the Bodil Award for Best Danish Film in 1967. For his leading role, Oscarsson won Best Actor awards at the 1966 Cannes Film Festival, the Best Actor award at the 4th Guldbagge Awards, 1967 Bodil Awards and the USA's National Society of Film Critics award for Best Actor in 1968. The film was also selected as the Danish entry for the Best Foreign Language Film at the 39th Academy Awards, but was not accepted as a nominee.

== See also ==
- List of submissions to the 39th Academy Awards for Best Foreign Language Film
- List of Danish submissions for the Academy Award for Best Foreign Language Film
