= Western Union Short Film Competition =

The Western Union Short Film Competition is a short film competition hosted by the Indian Film Festival of Melbourne. It is open to filmmakers from Australia and India. It allows filmmakers to showcase their films to a wide audience and establish connections within the industry.

The competition is the ultimate platform an aspiring filmmaker can hope for. The exposure, the reach and the encouragement offered are unparalleled. The Western Union Short Film Competition will always be a major milestone that gave me confidence and a showcase.

— Australian winner Varan Sharma (assistant of Shaad Ali on Kill Dil)

== Previous winners ==
2016 - 'Female Empowerment'

Out on a Lim - Joshua Walker (Aus)

2015 - 'Equality'

Rape: It’s Your Fault - All India Bakchod (India)

Road to Grand Final - Mark Hellinger and Jesse Maskell (Aus)

2014 - 'Hope'

Chasni - Abhishek Verma (India)

Makeover – Don Percy (Aus)

2013 - 'Freedom'

Give Sheep a Chance - Sean McCart (Aus)

Sati - Nilesh Desai (India)

Lockie n Love - Dimi Nakov (NZ)

The Interview - Faiz Sharif (Victorian Special Mention)

2012

Letters Home - Neilesh Verma

2011 - 'Dreams'

Mumbaikar Ganesh - Collin D’Cunha (India)

Khatabah - Ridwan Hassim (Aus)

Blank Spaces - Rajneel Singh (NZ)
