= Henning Carlsen =

Danish filmmaker

- Born: 4 June 1927; Ålborg, Denmark
- Died: 30 May 2014 (aged 86); Copenhagen, Denmark
- Occupations: Director; Screenwriter; Producer
- Years active: 1950–2014
- Awards: Bodil Award; 1966 Sult; 1967 Mennesker mødes og sød musik opstår i hjertet Honorary Robert; 2012 Sult

Henning Carlsen (4 June 1927 – 30 May 2014) was a Danish film director, screenwriter, and producer most noted for his documentaries and his contributions to the style of cinéma vérité. Carlsen's 1966 social-realistic drama Hunger (Sult) was nominated for the Palme d'Or and won the Bodil Award for Best Danish Film. Carlsen also won the Bodil Award the following year for the comedy People Meet and Sweet Music Fills the Heart. Acting as his own producer since 1960, Carlsen has directed more than 25 films, 19 for which he wrote the screenplay. In 2006, he received the Golden Swan Lifetime Achievement Award at the Copenhagen International Film Festival.

== Early life ==
Carlsen was born on 4 June 1927 in Aalborg, Denmark. In 1948, Carlsen became an assistant director at Minerva Film where he received on-the-job training. He worked at Minerva until 1953 when he shifted to Nordisk Film.

== Career ==
Carlsen began by writing and directing short documentaries and industry films, and with this background he flourished in the production of the cinéma vérité style. His documentary trilogy, De Gamle (The Elderly – 1961)), Familiebilleder (Family pictures- 1964) and Ung (Youth – 1965), created a classic portrait of 1960s Denmark as the nation revolutionized and transformed into a modern welfare society Especially noted was Carlsen's technique of rhythmic editing in De Gamle which produced a lyrical portrait of retirees without any needed commentary.

In 1962, Carlsen continued in cinéma vérité style with his first feature film: the harsh social drama Dilemma, released as A World of Strangers in the UK due to a naming conflict. Based upon the Nadine Gordimer's 1958 novel about apartheid, the movie was shot covertly on location in South Africa through Carlsen's use of a hidden camera. He followed this effort with the 1966 drama Hunger (Sult) based upon the autobiographical novel of Norwegian author Knut Hamsun. With its stark focus on a life of poverty and desperation, the film is considered a masterpiece of social realism and is one of the ten films listed in Denmark's cultural canon by the Danish Ministry of Culture. Carlsen was nominated for the Palme d'Or and won the Bodil Award for Best Danish Film.

The following year, Carlsen changed pace from his realistic dramas and made the comedy People Meet and Sweet Music Fills the Heart (Mennesker mødes og sød musik opstår i hjertet) based on the work of Jens August Schade. Again, he was awarded the Bodil Award for Best Danish Film. During his career, Carlsen has maintained interest in popular comedies with such films as Oh, to Be on the Bandwagon! (Man sku være noget ved musikken), in collaboration with Benny Andersen, and I Wonder Who's Kissing You Now?. In 1967, Carlsen returned to the same format of social realism he used in Sult with the drama We are All Demons (Klaubauterman), a story based upon a novel by Axel Sandemose.

In 1986, Carlsen filmed the international production Wolf at the Door starring Donald Sutherland. During his career, Carlsen has written 19 films and directed 21. He has also directed for both theater and television. Since 1966, Carlsen has been a teacher and member of the advisory council for the National Film School in Denmark. In 2006, Carlsen was the recipient of the Golden Swan Lifetime Achievement Award at the Copenhagen Film Festival.

In 2012 Carlsen received an honorary Robert Award for his body of work. He also released his film, Memoria de Mis Putas Tristes (Memories of My Melancholy Whores), adapted from the 2004 novel by Gabriel García Márquez.

== Books ==
Carlsen has written two books. The first, Mit livs fortrængninger (English: My Life's Forgettings), is an autobiography published in 1998 in Danish. Flyvske billeder (English: Images in Flight) is a history of the realisation of film and flight from the perspective of human development.

== Personal life ==
Henning Carlsen was married the first time to Hjørdis Wirth Jensen. In 1975 he married a second time with film consultant Else Heidary. He died at the age of 86 on 30 May 2014.

== Filmography ==
Year	Original Title	English Title	Notes
2012	Memoria de mis putas tristes	Memories of My Melancholy Whores	
2005	Springet	Springet	
1998	I Wonder Who's Kissing You Now	I Wonder Who's Kissing You Now	
1995	Pan	Two Green Feathers	
1986	Oviri	The Wolf at the Door	
1982	Pengene eller livet	Your Money or Your Life	
1978	Hør, var der ikke en som lo?	Did Somebody Laugh?	
1975	Da Svante forsvandt	When Svante Disappeared	
1975	En Lykkelig skilsmisse	A Happy Divorce	
1972	Man sku være noget ved musikken	Oh, to Be on the Bandwagon!	Entered into the 22nd Berlin International Film Festival
1971	Er i bange?	Are You Afraid?	
1969	Klabautermannen	We Are All Demons	Entered into the 19th Berlin International Film Festival
1967	Mennesker mødes og sød musik opstår i hjertet	People Meet and Sweet Music Fills the Heart	Bodil Award for Best Danish Film
1966	Sult	Hunger	Bodil Award for Best Danish Film
1965	Kattorna	The Cats	
1965	Ung	Youth	
1964	Familebilleder	Family Pictures	
1963	Hvad med os?	How About Us?	
1962	Dilemma	A World of Strangers	Grand Prize at Mannheim-Heidelberg International Filmfestival
1961	De Gamle	The Elderly	
1960	Souvenirs from Sweden	Souvenirs from Sweden	
1959	Et Knudeproblem		
1958	Cyklisten	The Bicyclist	
1950	Civilforsvaret	The Civil Defense	
1950	Dukkestuen		
