= Jens August Schade =

Danish poet (1903–1978)

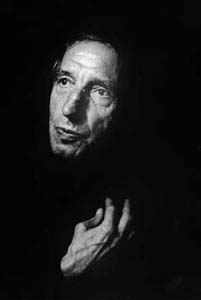
Portrait of Jens August Schade in 1973.

Jens August Schade (10 January 1903, Skive, Denmark - 11 November 1978, Copenhagen) was a Danish poet. His debut was the 1926 poetry collection den levende violin, "the living violin". He referred to himself in his poetry as "the bright poet". The themes of his poetry were often the interconnection between the erotic and the forces of the cosmos. In 1963 he received the grand prize of the Danish Academy. His 1928 work "Læren om staten" is part of the Danish Culture Canon.
