= Jos Stelling =

Dutch film director

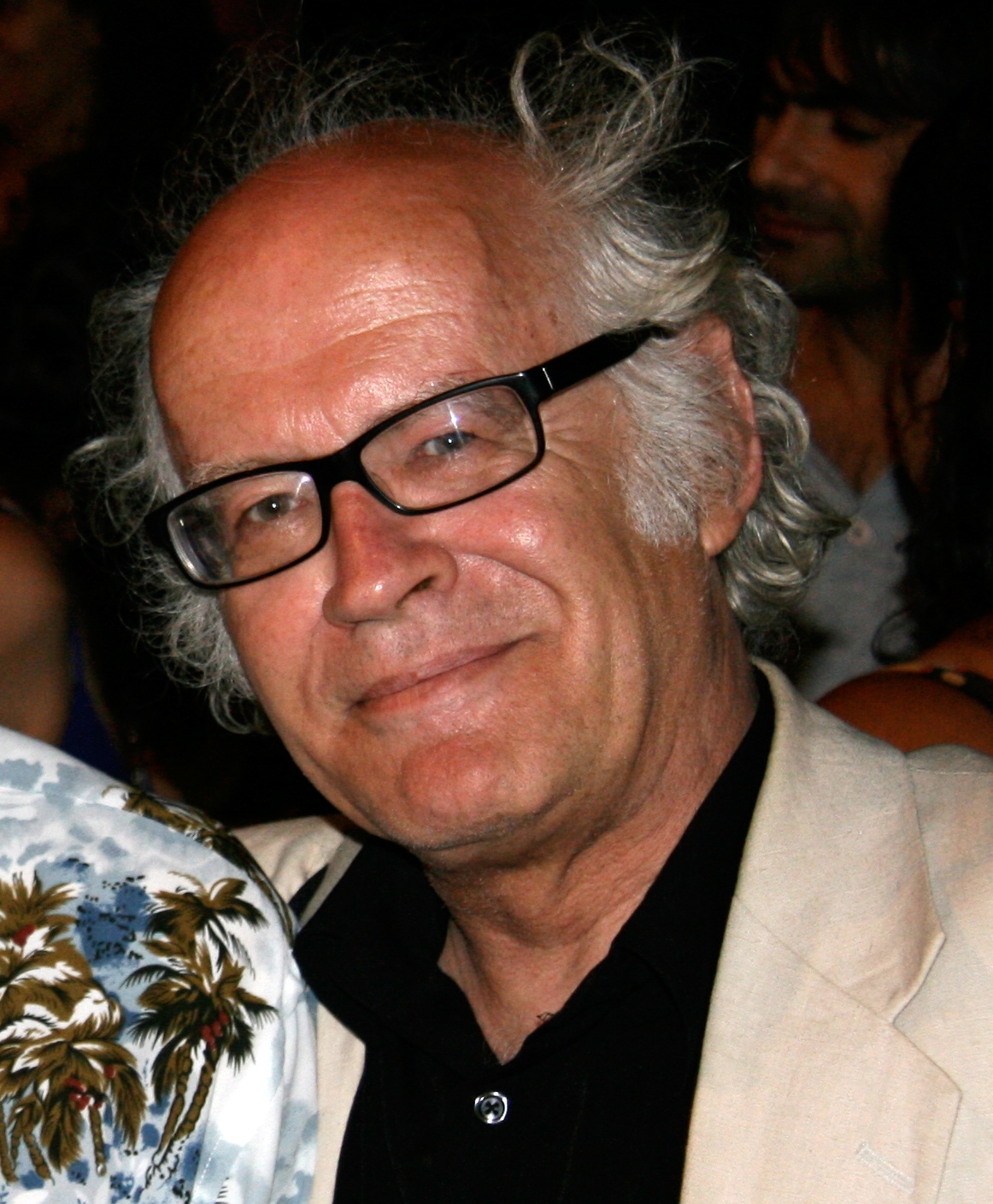
- Born: 16 July 1945 (age 81); Utrecht, Netherlands
- Occupations: Film director, screenwriter, film producer

Jos Stelling (born 16 July 1945) is a Dutch film director, screenwriter, and film producer.

== Career ==
Stelling made his directorial debut in 1974 with the film Mariken van Nieumeghen, which was selected for the official competition at the 1975 Cannes Film Festival.

In 1981, he founded the Dutch Film Days, a festival created to provide Dutch directors with an opportunity to screen their films and to foster a more informal and collaborative environment. Stelling served as chairman and director of the festival until 1991, after which the event was renamed the Netherlands Film Festival.

He was a jury member at several international film festivals, including the 16th Moscow International Film Festival in 1989 and the 24th Moscow International Film Festival in 2002. He was also the president of the jury at the inaugural Odesa International Film Festival in 2010.

Stelling is the founder and owner of three arthouse cinemas in Utrecht: Springhaver (opened in 1978), the Louis Hartlooper Complex (opened in 2004) and Slachtstraat filmtheater (opened in 2022)

== Filmography ==
- Mariken van Nieumeghen (1974)
- Elckerlyc (1975)
- Rembrandt fecit 1669 (1977)
- The Pretenders (1981)
- The Illusionist (1983)
- The Pointsman (De Wisselwachter) (1986)
- The Waiting Room (1995)
- The Flying Dutchman (1995)
- No Trains No Planes (1999)
- The Gas Station (2000)
- The Gallery (2003)
- Duska (2007)
- The Visit (2010) – based on a short story by Remco Campert
- The Girl and Death (2012)
- De dans van Natasja (2023)

== Awards and nominations ==
- 1975 – Selected for Official Competition, 1975 Cannes Film Festival: Mariken van Nieumeghen
- 1981 – Nomination for Golden Prize at the 12th Moscow International Film Festival for The Pretenders
- 2014 – ShortCutz Amsterdam Career Achievement Award
