= The Girls (1968 film) =

1968 Swedish drama film by Mai Zetterling

- Directed by: Mai Zetterling
- Screenplay by: Mai Zetterling; David Hughes
- Based on: Lysistrata; 411 BC play by Aristophanes
- Produced by: Göran Lindgren
- Starring: Bibi Andersson; Harriet Andersson; Gunnel Lindblom; Gunnar Björnstrand; Erland Josephson; Stig Engström
- Cinematography: Rune Ericson
- Edited by: Wic' Kjellin
- Music by: Michael John Hurd
- Production company: Sandrew Film & Teater
- Distributed by: Sandrew Film & Teater
- Release date: 16 September 1968 (Sweden)
- Running time: 100 minutes
- Country: Sweden
- Language: Swedish

The Girls (Swedish: Flickorna) is a 1968 Swedish-language drama film directed by Mai Zetterling, starring Bibi Andersson, Harriet Andersson and Gunnel Lindblom. It is a feminist reinvention of the ancient Greek play Lysistrata by Aristophanes, and revolves around a theatre group which sets up the play.

In 2012, the film was voted one of the 25 best Swedish films of all time.

== Plot ==
Liz, Marianne, and Gunilla are three actresses who have been hired to perform in a touring production of Lysistrata. Each woman faces challenges leaving their homes in order to tour. Marianne has left her married boyfriend and finds it difficult to leave her toddler in the hands of babysitters as she goes on tour. Liz's husband is having an affair and wants her to leave while Gunilla, a mother of four young children, is urged not to leave by her husband who wants her to stay at home to help with the children.

Along the tour they are met with polite indifference as audience members either fail to grasp the meaning of the play or are bored by it. After one performance Liz asks members of the audience to stay behind to discuss the meaning of the play but when she tries to speak to them of the importance of women they do not react and a male member of the company acts as if it is just a continuation of the play and ushers her offstage. Liz's stunt attracts attention from the press but as Liz is not able to identify any one incident that led to her outburst they are dismissive of it. Later all three of the leads go out to dinner and talk over the problem of no one relating to the play wondering if perhaps it would be better if they held a woman only show. At dinner they are bothered by several men and when they turn down the men's advances the men become hostile and only leave after Marianne threatens them.

On the road, a friend of Liz's husband urges her to come home on behalf of her husband, saying he needs a wife to properly support him and his work. Liz argues that she is tired of putting her husband first but her husband's friend argues that her husband's work is more important than hers. She stays on till the end of the play.

The tour finishes and the women return home feeling as though no one is willing to change, but they have at least made people more aware of the misery of their lives. At a party celebrating the end of the play Liz tells the company that she wants to get a divorce.

== Cast ==
- Bibi Andersson as Liz, actress, "Lysistrate"
- Harriet Andersson as Marianne, actress, "Myrrhine"
- Gunnel Lindblom as Gunilla, actress, "Kalonike"
- Gunnar Björnstrand as Hugo, actor
- Erland Josephson as Carl, stockbroker, married to Liz
- Frank Sundström as the doctor, Marianne's lover
- Åke Lindström as Bengt, Gunilla’s husband
- Stig Engström as Thommy, actor
- Ulf Palme as director
- Leif Liljeroth as manager of the tourism office in Kiruna
- Margaret Weivers as manager's wife

== Release and reception ==
The film premiered in Sweden on 16 September 1968 through Sandrew Film & Teater. It was not a financial success upon its initial release. The critics attacked it, few saw it and there was no money for new films. It would take almost twenty years before Zetterling could make her fourth Swedish feature film, Amorosa, which became the director's last film.

The film did have strong supporters. No less a luminary than Simone de Beauvoir called Mai Zetterling’s riotous feature "the best movie ever made by a woman". She wrote in Le Monde, “Through a moment in the lives of three women, we sense what it means to be a woman. What a verbal account can only poorly show is the art with which Mai Zetterling tells her story. All the images have multiple dimensions, the theatrical scenes reflect real life, and this touches on the dreams which brings us back to reality. Ironic and comic, this film moves us by the beauty of its landscapes, its poetry and above all the subtle tenderness with which we are shown the feminine faces. It is a great success and I hope that many will see it – men and women – to discover its seductions.”

The film's stature has improved over time. In 2012, the film was voted one of the 25 best Swedish films of all time.

== Home video ==
This film, together with Zetterling's Loving Couples and Night Games was released by Criterion Collection in a 3 blu-ray collection Three Films by Mai Zetterling in December 2022.

== Related film ==
In 1996 a documentary, Lines From the Heart, reuniting The Girls actors Harriet Andersson, Bibi Andersson, and Gunnel Lindblom was made by director Christina Olofson.
