= Brother Carl =

1971 film by Susan Sontag

- Promotional release poster
- Directed by: Susan Sontag
- Written by: Susan Sontag
- Produced by: Göran Lindgren
- Starring: Gunnel Lindblom; Geneviève Page; Laurent Terzieff; Keve Hjelm
- Cinematography: Rune Ericson
- Edited by: Lars Hagström
- Music by: Torbjörn Lundquist
- Production company: Sandrews
- Release dates: May 1971 (Cannes); August 11, 1972 (New York City)
- Running time: 97 minutes
- Country: Sweden
- Language: English

Brother Carl (Swedish: Bröder Carl) is a 1971 Swedish English-language film written and directed by American writer Susan Sontag, and produced by Göran Lindgren. It stars Gunnel Lindblom, Geneviève Page, Laurent Terzieff, and Keve Hjelm.

Brother Carl had its world premiere in May 1971 at the Cannes Film Festival in its Directors' Fortnight section, and opened in New York City on August 11, 1972.

== Cast ==
- Geneviève Page as Karen Sandler
- Gunnel Lindblom as Lena Holmberg
- Keve Hjelm as Martin Ericsson
- Laurent Terzieff as Carl Noren

== Reception ==
Jonathan Rosenbaum of The Village Voice wrote that, "Unlike [Sontag's] thumbless four-finger exercise, Duet for Cannibals, Brother Carl does not fully achieve what it sets out to do, but the scope of its ambition is so much wider that one can find its failure far worthier than the modest success of her first film."

Sally Beauman, in a review of the film for New York, called it "a strange work"; she criticized its pacing and the characterization of Carl, but concluded that, "the faults do not detract ultimately from the film's worth. It is made with a compassion and uncompromising intelligence all too rare among directors." The New York Times' Roger Greenspun criticized Page's performance but wrote overall that the film "[takes] considerable imaginative and emotional risks, as Duet for Cannibals did not, and the result is a real movie."

According to Sontag, the film had a "disastrous reception".
