= Birgitta Valberg =

Swedish actress (1916–2014)

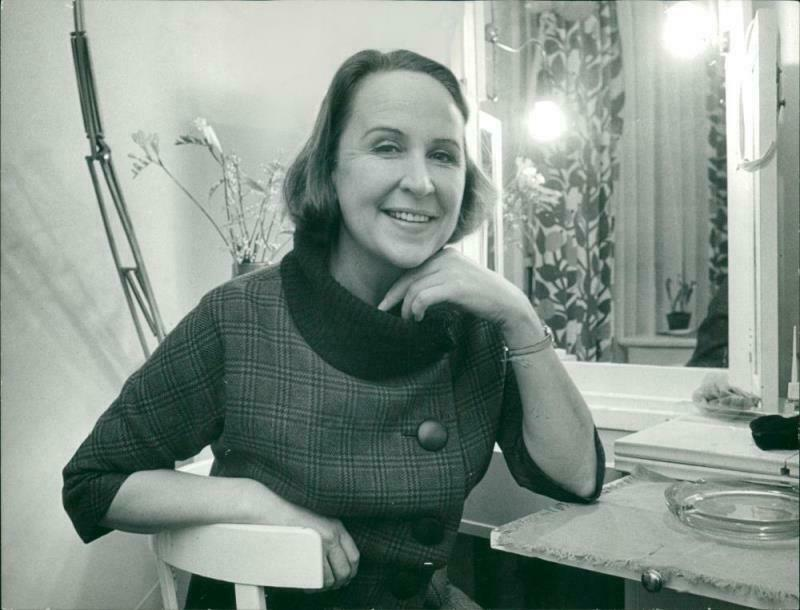
- Born: 16 December 1916; Stockholm, Sweden
- Died: 29 March 2014 (aged 97); Lidingö, Sweden
- Occupation: Actress
- Years active: 1934–1996
- Spouse: Hans Hansson (m. 1939; died 1976)
- Children: 3

Birgitta Valberg (16 December 1916 – 29 March 2014) was a Swedish actress. She was best known for her work in several Ingmar Bergman films made over 30 years, including the Bergman-produced Summer Paradise (1977). For her role in this film, which was directed by Gunnel Lindblom, another member of Bergman's repertory company, she won the award for Best Actress at the 13th Guldbagge Awards.

She trained at the Royal Dramatic Training Academy.

== Filmography ==
=== Film ===
- 1934: Unga hjärtan - Ingrid
- 1939: The People of Högbogården - Young Woman
- 1939: Melodin från Gamla Stan - Woman at the restaurant (uncredited)
- 1941: In Paradise - Marianne
- 1941: The Fight Continues - Nurse
- 1942: Bambi - Bambi's Mother (Swedish dub)
- 1943: Life in the Country - Frida von Rambow
- 1948: Port of Call - Mrs. Vilander
- 1949: Love Wins Out - Schwester Erika
- 1951: Divorced - Eva Möller
- 1953: Barabbas - Veronica from Cyrene (uncredited)
- 1953: House of Women - Vera
- 1954: Flottans glada gossar - Olga Ekman
- 1954:Taxi 13 - Britt-Marie
- 1954: Karin Månsdotter - Queen Dowager
- 1955: Farligt löfte - Irma Strand
- 1955: Smiles of a Summer Night - Actress
- 1956: The Staffan Stolle Story - Fru Lefverhielm
- 1956: Sista natten - The Man's Wife
- 1957: Synnöve Solbakken - Karen Solbakken
- 1958: Miss April - Ms. Holm, secretary
- 1959: Sleeping Beauty - Maleficent (Swedish dub)
- 1960: The Virgin Spring - Märeta
- 1960: Heart's Desire - Henriette Löwenflycht
- 1962: The Mistress - The Motherly (uncredited)
- 1964: Svenska bilder - Mrs. Lundberg
- 1965: För vänskaps skull - Nun
- 1966: The Princess - Doctor
- 1968: Shame - fru Jacobi
- 1969: Som natt och dag - Cecilia
- 1970: Storia di una donna - Mrs. Ullman
- 1976: The Man on the Roof - Mrs. Nyman
- 1977: Summer Paradise - Katha
- 1980: Flygnivå 450 - Hedvall
- 1988: Ingen rövare finns i skogen (Short) - Mormor
- 1989: Peter och Petra - Grandmother
- 1992: Sunday's Children - Grandmother

=== Television ===
- 1955: Hamlet (TV Movie) - Drottning Gertrud
- 1961: Han som fick leva om sitt liv (TV Movie) - Anna
- 1961: Mr Ernest (TV Movie) - Lady Bracknall
- 1961: En handelsresandes död (TV Movie) - Linda Loman
- 1961: Ljuva ungdomstid (TV Movie) - Essie, Nat's wife
- 1962: Sex roller söka en författare (TV Movie) - Madame Paix
- 1968: Rötter (TV Movie) - Mrs. Bryant
- 1973: Näsan (TV Movie) - Sven's wife
- 1973: Pelikanen (TV Movie) - The mother
- 1973: En skugga (TV Movie) - Vera's mother
- 1979: En handelsresandes död (TV Movie) - Linda Loman
- 1980: Räkan från Maxim (TV Movie) - Hertiginnan de Valmonté
- 1986: Studierektorns sista strid - Agnes
- 1990: S*M*A*S*H - Tant Sporrhane
- 1990-1991: Storstad - Maria Zimmermann
- 1993: Polisen och domarmordet - Frideborg Glans
- 1995: Snoken - Margit Edström
- 1996: Idlaflickorna (TV Movie) - Galen Fru (final film role)
