= Blushing Charlie =

1970 film

- Directed by: Vilgot Sjöman
- Written by: Vilgot Sjöman
- Produced by: Göran Lindgren
- Starring: Bernt Lundquist
- Cinematography: Rune Ericson
- Edited by: Carl-Olov Skeppstedt
- Production company: Sandrews
- Distributed by: Sandrews
- Release date: 9 November 1970
- Running time: 119 minutes
- Country: Sweden
- Language: Swedish

Blushing Charlie (Swedish: Lyckliga skitar) is a 1970 Swedish drama film directed by Vilgot Sjöman. It was entered into the 21st Berlin International Film Festival.

== Cast ==
- Bernt Lundquist - Karl-Inge 'Charlie' Svensson
- Solveig Ternström - Pia Bergström
- Tomas Bolme - PV
- Inger Liljefors - Anita
- Christer Boustedt - Krille
- Lasse Werner - Lasse
- Gösta Wälivaara - Gösta
- Janne 'Loffe' Carlsson - Janne (as Janne Carlsson)
- Bertil Norström - Charlie's manager
- Olle Andersson - Clerk
- Janet Pettersson - Taxen
- Jan Nygren - Lennart
- Lilian Johansson - Ärtan
- Lisbeth Zachrisson - Bunny
- Marianne Sydow
