= Ulla Isaksson =

Swedish author and screenplay writer (1916-2000)

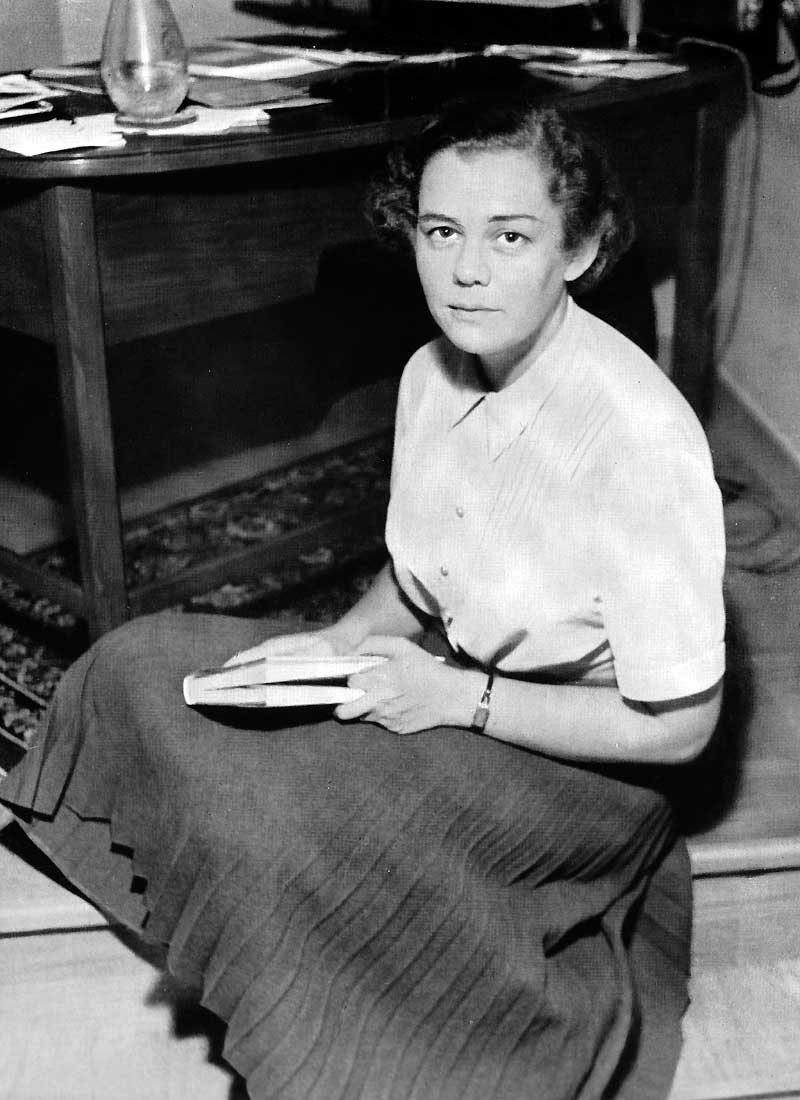
- Ulla Isaksson
- Born: 22 June 1916; Stockholm, Sweden
- Died: 24 April 2000 (aged 83); Stockholm, Sweden
- Occupation: Writer
- Writing career
- Language: Swedish

Ulla Isaksson (22 June 1916 – 24 April 2000) was a Swedish author and screenplay writer. She was born and died in Stockholm, Sweden. In addition to her short stories and novels, Isaksson also wrote scripts for films and plays.

== Early life and education ==
Isaksson was born in Stockholm in 1916, the daughter of Knut Lundberg and Greta Brasch, who was a member of the Immanuelkyrkan church; this gave Isaksson's upbringing a strong religious character, something that marked her early novels. Isaksson graduated from high school in 1937; she then began studying philosophy. The next year she married David Isaksson. She was awarded the honorary degree of Doctor of philosophy in 1978.

== Career ==
In 1940 Isaksson debuted with the novel Trädet and in 1952 she got her public breakthrough with the novel Kvinnohuset, which was made into a film by Erik Faustman. Ingmar Bergman adapted her novel Det vänliga, värdiga (1954) in 1958, and after that he hired Isaksson to write the screenplay for the film Jungfrukällan (1960). Her novel Klänningen was adapted by Vilgot Sjöman in 1964, Paradistorg became a movie in 1977, directed by Gunnel Lindblom, and Bergman made a television movie of the novel De två saliga (1962).

Several of Isaksson's novels of the 1950s are marked by religious problems, as ultimately in Havet and Dit du icke vill, where 17th century witchcraft trials in a village in Dalarna are portrayed of the bases of contemporary protocols. In her previous books she had written primarily about religious tensions and conflicts. In later novels she also directed analysis against erotic motifs, world problems, women's issues, and parenting.

Isaksson remained married to David Isaksson until 1963, when she married secondly the author Erik Hjalmar Linder. Together with Linder, she wrote a two-part biography of the author and journalist Elin Wägner called Elin Wagner, amazon with two breasts, 1882-1922 (Bonnier, 1977) and Elin Wagner, daughter of Mother Earth, 1922-1949 (Bonnier, 1980).

In 1994, Ulla Isaksson's autobiography Boken om E was published. This is largely about how she saw her husband Erik Hjalmar Linder suffering from Alzheimer's disease. Boken om E was adapted for the screen in 2001, directed by Bille August, and entitled A Song for Martin.

Isaksson died on 24 April 2000, before the adaptation of Boken om E.

=== De två saliga (The two blessed), 1962 ===
The book portrays a couple whose love, in combination with psychosis and religious blindness, causes them to go under. The frame story, about a psychiatrist who reads journals concerning this "case", is following another marriage. The book's core question is what actually determines if a relationship based on love is healthy or sick. It is a classic case description, created using hospital records, letters, and recollections. De två saliga was made into a movie by Ingmar Bergman, and released in 1986.

=== Kvinnohuset (The women's house), 1952 ===
Kvinnohuset is about a shared housing unit for single working women. A chain of human destinies that cross and touch each other, and where the common denominator is that they are all women living in the same house. A special house for single self-sufficient women, with a doorman for help. The topic of the day is the young theater student Eva Lind, who is about to move in. Most tenants know she is the theater decorator Trygve Krook's mistress. Krook has got an apartment for her in the house, where his wife Anna also lives. The other women living in the house have a hard time understanding her toleration and her indifference to the husband's doings. Kvinnohuset was made into a movie in 1953 and was the first of Ulla Isaksson's novels that was adapted.

=== Paradistorg (Paradise square), 1973 ===
Paradistorg is the name of a summerhouse in Vaxholm. There, four generations find refuge. But the idyll of the Stockholm archipelago is mined and false security. Families have different ways of living, and old conflicts clash with new, which results in individuals and generations turning against each other.

=== Boken om E (The book about E), 1994 ===
Ulla Isakssons autobiographical account of how her husband Erik Hjalmar Linder suffered from Alzheimer's disease. Here, she was very open and self-critical about what she experienced.

== Bibliography ==
- Trädet (1940)
- I denna natt (1942)
- Av krukmakarens hand (1945)
- Ytterst i havet (1950)
- Kvinnohuset (1952)
- Dödens faster (fiction, 1954)
- Dit du icke vill (1956)
- Klänningen (1959)
- De två saliga (1962)
- Våra torsdagar (play) (1964)
- Klockan (1966)
- Amanda eller den blå spårvagnen (1969)
- Paradistorg (1973)
- Elin Wägner del 1, together with Erik Hjalmar Linder (1977)
- Elin Wägner del 2, together with Erik Hjalmar Linder (1980)
- Födelsedagen (1988)
- Boken om E (1994)

== Filmography ==
- 1953 – Kvinnohuset (Script)
- 1958 – Nära livet (Script)
- 1960 – Jungfrukällan (Script)
- 1983 – Här har ni hans liv! (TV-show)
- 1988 – Hjalmar och Stina (TV-show)
- 1993 – Chefen fru Ingeborg (TV-show)

== Awards ==
- Svenska Dagbladets litteraturpris (1952)
- Member of Samfundet De Nio (1973)
- Member of Kungliga Vetenskaps- och Vitterhetssamhället i Göteborg (1977)
- Hedersdoktor in Stockholm (1978)
- Göteborgs-Postens litteraturpris (1988)
- Stiftelsen Selma Lagerlöfs litteraturpris (1995)
- Samfundet De Nios Särskilda pris (1999)
