= Loving Couples =

Loving Couples may refer to:

- Loving Couples (1964 film), a 1964 Swedish film
- Loving Couples (1980 film), a 1980 American film
