= The Little Book =

The Little Book may refer to:

- The Little Book (Hughes novel), a novel by English writer David Hughes
- The Little Book (Edwards novel), a novel by American writer Selden Edwards
- The Elements of Style by Strunk and White
