= Summer Paradise (film) =

1977 film

- Film poster
- Directed by: Gunnel Lindblom
- Written by: Ulla Isaksson; Gunnel Lindblom
- Based on: Paradistorg by Ulla Isaksson
- Produced by: Ingmar Bergman
- Starring: Birgitta Valberg
- Cinematography: Tony Forsberg
- Release date: 2 February 1977
- Running time: 113 minutes
- Country: Sweden
- Language: Swedish

Summer Paradise (Swedish: Paradistorg) is a 1977 Swedish drama film directed by Gunnel Lindblom. Birgitta Valberg won the award for Best Actress at the 13th Guldbagge Awards.

== Cast ==
- Marianne Aminoff as Christina
- Maria Blomkvist as Eva
- Anna Borg as Kajsa
- Margaretha Byström as Annika (as Margareta Byström)
- Agneta Ekmanner as Sassa
- Pontus Gustafsson as Tomas
- Mats Helander as Andreas
- Inga Landgré as Saga
- Dagny Lind as Alma
- Oscar Ljung as Arthur
- Holger Löwenadler as Wilhelm
- Toni Magnusson as King
- Per Myrberg as Ture
- Gösta Prüzelius as Carl-Henrik
- Sif Ruud as Emma
- Göran Stangertz as Puss
- Solveig Ternström as Ingrid
- Birgitta Valberg as Katha
