= Lilian Johansson =

Swedish actress (born 1948)

- Born: 10 March 1948 (age 78); Stockholm, Sweden

Anny Lilian Johansson (born 10 March 1948 in Stockholm) is a Swedish actress. She has been engaged at the Stockholm City Theatre since 1978.

== Filmography ==
- Blå måndag (2001)
- 1997 – Svensson Svensson
- Beck – Mannen med ikonerna (1997)
- Vinterviken (1996)
- Streber (1978)
- Lyckliga skitar (1970)
