= Mai Zetterling =

Swedish actress (1925–1994)

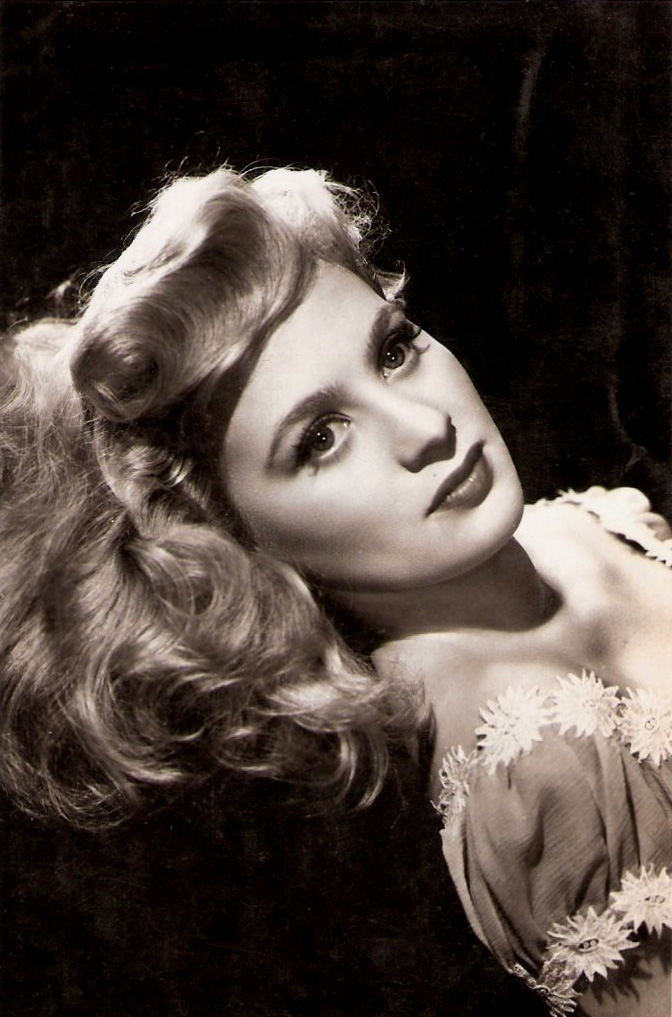
- Zetterling from a promotional postcard for Quartet (1948)
- Born: Mai Elisabeth Zetterling; 24 May 1925; Västerås, Sweden
- Died: 17 March 1994 (aged 68); London, England
- Occupations: Actress, film director
- Years active: 1941–1994
- Spouses: Tutte Lemkow (m. 1944; div. 1953) David Hughes (m. 1958; div. 1979)
- Children: 2

Mai Elisabeth Zetterling (Swedish pronunciation: [ˈmajː ˈsɛ̂tːɛˌɭɪŋ]; 24 May 1925 – 17 March 1994) was a Swedish film director, novelist and actress.

== Early life ==
Zetterling was born in Västerås, Sweden to a working class family. She started her career as an actor at the age of 17 at the Royal Dramatic Theatre, the Swedish national theatre, appearing in war-era films.

== Career ==
Zetterling appeared in film and television productions spanning six decades from the 1940s to the 1990s. Her breakthrough as an actress came in the 1944 film Torment written for her by Ingmar Bergman, in which she played a controversial role as a tormented shopgirl. Shortly afterwards, she moved to England and gained instant success there with her title role in Basil Dearden's Frieda (1947), playing opposite David Farrar.

After a brief return to Sweden, in which she worked with Bergman again in his film Music in Darkness (1948), she returned to Britain and starred in a number of UK films. Some of her notable films as an actress include Quartet (1948), a film based on some of W. Somerset Maugham's short stories, The Romantic Age (1949) directed by Edmond T. Gréville, Only Two Can Play (1962) co-starring Peter Sellers and directed by Sidney Gilliat, and The Witches (1990), an adaptation of Roald Dahl's book directed by Nicolas Roeg. Having gained a reputation as a sex symbol in dramas and thrillers, she was equally effective in comedies, and was active in British television in the 1950s and 1960s.

In 1960, she appeared in Danger Man as Nadia in the episode "The Sisters".

She began directing and publishing novels and non-fiction in the early 1960s, her films starting with political documentaries and a short film titled The War Game (1963), which was nominated for a BAFTA award, and won a Silver Lion at Venice, both for the Best Short Film. Her directorial feature film debut Älskande par (1964, "Loving Couples"), based on the novels of Agnes von Krusenstjerna, caused a scandal at the 1965 Cannes Film Festival for its sexual explicitness and nudity. Kenneth Tynan of The Observer later called it "one of the most ambitious debuts since Citizen Kane". It was not the only film she made that caused controversy for its frank sexuality.

When critics reviewing her debut feature stated that "Mai Zetterling directs like a man", she began to explore feminist themes more explicitly in her work. The Girls, which had an all-star Swedish cast that included Bibi Andersson and Harriet Andersson, discussed women's liberation (or lack thereof) in a society controlled by men, as the protagonists compare their lives to characters in the play Lysistrata, and find that things have not progressed very much for women since ancient times. In 1966, she appeared as a storyteller on the BBC children's programme Jackanory, and in five episodes narrated Tove Jansson's Finn Family Moomintroll.

She is perhaps most famously known as Luke's Grandmother in the 1990 film 'The Witches' which was one of her final lead roles before her death in 1994.

== Personal life ==
Zetterling was married to Norwegian actor Tutte Lemkow from 1944 to 1953. They had a daughter, Etienne and a son, Louis, who is professor of environmental sociology at the Autonomous University of Barcelona. She published an autobiography, All Those Tomorrows. From 1958 to 1979, she was married to British author David Hughes, who collaborated with her on her first films as director.

Documents at the National Archives in London show that, as she lived in a communal house, she was watched by MI5 as a suspected Communist. This coincided with the McCarthyite purges in Hollywood. However, it did not hamper her career.

== Death ==
On 17 March 1994, a year after her final role on television, Zetterling died of cancer at her home in London. She was 68 years old.

== Filmography ==
As Director

Year	Title	Notes
1990	Love at First Sight	"Sunday Pursuit"
1990	Chillers	"The Stuff of Madness"
1989	Crossbow	"The Children," The Wind Wagon," and "Forbidden Land"
1986	Betongmormor	Short film
1986	Amorosa	
1985	The Hitchhiker	"And If We Dream," "Hired Help," and "Murderous Feelings"
1983	Scrubbers	
1982	Love	segments "Love From the Market Place," "The Black Cat in the Black Mouse Socks," and "Julia"
1977	The Moon Is a Green Cheese	
1976	We Have Many Names	
1973	Visions of Eight	
1972	Vincent the Dutchman	
1968	The Girls (Flickorna)	
1968	Doctor Glas	
1966	Night Games (Nattlek)	
1964	Loving Couples (Älskande par)	
1963	The War Game	Short film
1961	Lords of Little Egypt	

As Actor

Year	Title	Notes
1993	Grandpa's Journey	
1990	The Witches	
1990	Hidden Agenda	
1965	The Vine Bridge	
1963	The Man Who Finally Died	
1963	Operation Mermaid	
1962	The Main Attraction	
1962	Only Two Can Play	
1961	Offbeat	
1960	Piccadilly Third Stop	
1960	Faces in the Dark	
1959	Jet Storm	
1958	Playing on the Rainbow	
1958	The Master Builder	
1957	The Truth About Women	
1957	Seven Waves Away (Alternate Tiles Abandon Ship! and Seven Days From Now)	
1956	A Doll's House	
1955	A Prize of Gold	
1954	Knock on Wood	
1954	Dance Little Lady	
1953	Desperate Moment	
1952	The Tall Headlines	
1952	The Ringer	
1951	Hell Is Sold Out	
1951	Blackmailed	
1949	The Lost People	
1949	The Bad Lord Byron	
1949	The Romantic Age	
1948	Quartet	
1948	Portrait from Life	
1948	Music in Darkness	
1948	Life Starts Now	
1947	Frieda	
1946	Iris and the Lieutenant	
1946	Sunshine Follows Rain	
1944	Torment	
1944	Prince Gustaf	
1943	I Killed	
1941	Lasse-Maja	

== Works ==
- Zetterling, Mai (1968). Night Games. Panther Books. ISBN 978-0-586-02449-2. OCLC 936919503.
- Zetterling, Mai (1976). Bird of Passage. St. Martin's Press. ISBN 978-0-312-08120-1. OCLC 2424469.
