= The Fight Continues =

1941 film

- Directed by: Gustaf Molander
- Written by: Lennart Sahlin; Gösta Stevens; Gustaf Molander
- Starring: Victor Sjöström; Renée Björling; Anne-Margrethe Björlin
- Cinematography: Åke Dahlqvist
- Edited by: Oscar Rosander
- Music by: Gunnar Johansson
- Production company: Svensk Filmindustri
- Release date: 20 October 1941
- Running time: 94 minutes
- Country: Sweden
- Language: Swedish

The Fight Continues (Swedish: Striden går vidare) is a 1941 Swedish drama film directed by Gustaf Molander and starring Victor Sjöström, Renée Björling and Anne-Margrethe Björlin.

The film's art direction was by Arne Åkermark.

== Partial cast ==
- Victor Sjöström as Andreas Berg
- Renée Björling as Betty Berg
- Anne-Margrethe Björlin as Inga Berg
- Erik 'Bullen' Berglund as Dr. Eriksson
- Alf Kjellin as Dr. Georg Hammar
- Gerd Hagman as Nurse Maria Granberg
- Nils Lundell as Kurre Karlsson
- Carl Ström as Arnell
- Elsa Ebbesen as Anna, nurse
- Carl Deurell as Prof. Karlgren
- Kotti Chave as Dr. Ström
- Gösta Terserus as Dr. Lundin
- Olav Riégo as Dr. Fagrell
- Karl Erik Flens as Doctor
- Helge Mauritz as Doctor
- Yngve Nyqvist as Doctor
- Hjördis Petterson as Augusta Sofia Svensson, alcoholic
- Hilda Borgström as Mrs. Hagberg
- Oscar Ljung as Allan Hagberg
- John Ekman as Lundström
- Josua Bengtson as Man in waiting room
- Ernst Brunman as Patient
- Ingemar Holde as Man in City Hall
- Aurore Palmgren as Nurse
- Ingrid Envall as Ingrid, nurse
- Gerda Boman as Nurse
- Birgitta Valberg as Nurse
- Stig Olin as Judge
- Hartwig Fock as Soccer player's father
- Linnéa Hillberg as Jenny
- Wilma Malmlöf as Lady at Newsstand
- Lisa Wirström as Woman at the newsstand
- Gun Adler as Nurse in waiting room
- Emmy Albiin as Woman in the newsstand
- Gösta Bodin
- Eric Dahlström
- Margit Andelius as Lady in Waiting Room
- Mona Geijer-Falkner as Berg's Maid
- Hugo Björne as Judge
- Axel Lagerberg as Lawyer
- Victor Thorén as Waiter at Djurgårdsbrunn
- Margareta Bergman as Woman in waiting room

== Bibliography ==
- Mariah Larsson & Anders Marklund. Swedish Film: An Introduction and Reader. Nordic Academic Press, 2010.
