= She Thought It Was Him =

1943 film

- Directed by: Per-Axel Branner
- Written by: Edvin Adolphson; Sven Stolpe
- Starring: Edvin Adolphson; Anne-Margrethe Björlin; Naemi Briese
- Cinematography: Karl-Erik Alberts
- Edited by: Edvin Fredrikson
- Music by: Sven Rüno
- Production company: Svensk Talfilm
- Distributed by: Svensk Talfilm
- Release date: 28 August 1943
- Running time: 100 minutes
- Country: Sweden
- Language: Swedish

She Thought It Was Him (Swedish: Hon trodde det var han) is a 1943 Swedish comedy crime film directed by Per-Axel Branner and starring Edvin Adolphson, Anne-Margrethe Björlin and Naemi Briese. It was shot at the Centrumateljéerna Studios in Stockholm. The film's sets wered designed by the art director Bertil Duroj.

== Synopsis ==
The publisher of a famous author pressure him to write in a more popular genre such as a crime. When he returns to his apartment he discovers a burglar with an uncanny likeness to himself. They agree to switch places to that the author can more accurately study crime at first end.

== Cast ==
- Edvin Adolphson as Mark Storm / Kurret
- Anne-Margrethe Björlin as Elsa
- Naemi Briese as Carmen
- Åke Claesson as Publisher
- Marianne Löfgren as Secretary
- Carl Hagman as Major Staalhammar
- Carl-Gunnar Wingård as Engineer
- Hilding Gavle as Professor
- Sture Baude as 'Farfar'
- Ragnar Widestedt as Hotel manager
- Agda Helin as Major's wife
- Carl Deurell as Bengtsson
- David Erikson as Hotel receptionist
- Tom Walter as 'Fimpen'
- Harry Ahlin as 'Smockan'
- John Melin as 'Bomben'
- Siegfried Fischer as 'Tjacket'
- Wiktor Andersson as 'Snoken'
- John Norrman as Svängbulten
- Artur Cederborgh as 'Kisen'
- John Starck as 'Dansken'
- Wilma Malmlöf as Hulda
- John Elfström as Policeman
- Margareta Fahlén as Switchboard operator

== Bibliography ==
- Tapper, Michael. Swedish Cops: From Sjöwall and Wahlöö to Stieg Larsson. Intellect Books, 2014.
- Qvist, Per Olov & von Bagh, Peter. Guide to the Cinema of Sweden and Finland. Greenwood Publishing Group, 2000.
