= The Pork Butcher =

- First edition
- Author: David Hughes
- Language: English
- Publisher: Constable & Co.
- Publication date: 1984
- ISBN: 0-09-465510-3 (first edition)
- Dewey Decimal: 823.914
- LC Class: PR6058.U34 P6

The Pork Butcher is a novel by English writer David Hughes, first published in 1984, and winner of the 1984 Welsh Arts council prize and the 1985 WH Smith Literary Award.

== Outline ==
Based on the massacre of the inhabitants of Oradour-sur-Glane and the subsequent memorialisation of the razed village, the novel recounts the return of a former German soldier, Ernst Kestner, a Lübeck pork butcher dying of lung cancer, to the village of Lascaud-sur-Marn where he was quartered, where he fell in love, and where he participated in an unthinkable atrocity. Dealing with themes of guilt and reparation, and memory and its exploitation, the book centres less on the horror of war - which is by no means absent - than on the paradoxical nature of human relations. Kestner's attempts to expiate his remorse collide with his daughter's resistance to know on the one hand, and what one survivor, the local mayor and national deputy, has made of having his own personal history reduced to ashes from one day to the next. A short novel which eschews character development for paradoxical dialogue and plot twist, it is one of Hughes' most successful, having been filmed as Souvenir. In his characterisations of Kestner, his daughter Louise, her husband Henri, and the deputy Lorion, Hughes also attempts to seize upon salient aspects of German and French character, sometimes more to the detriment of the latter than the former.
