= Torsten Gårdlund =

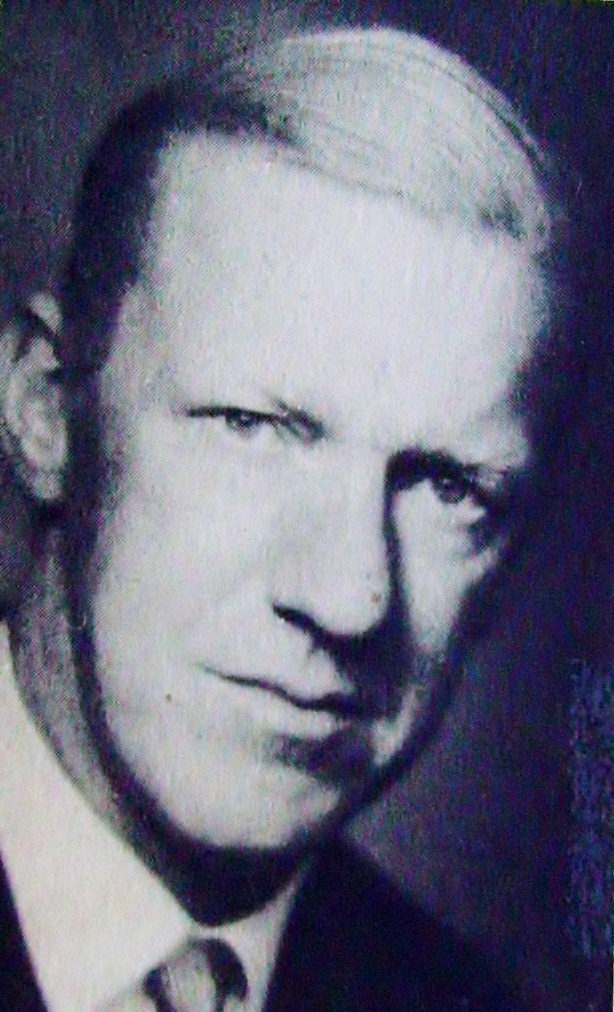
- Born: 23 February 1911; Stockholm, Sweden
- Died: 21 February 2003 (aged 91); Genarp, Sweden
- Years active: 1936–1976
- Spouse(s): Ingrid Schmidt (m. 1939) Ingrid Österling (m. 1947) Anne-Margrethe Björlin (m. 1957)

Academic background
- Education: Stockholm University College; Stockholm School of Economics; University of Chicago
- Thesis: Industrial society (1942)
- Influences: Eli Heckscher

Academic work
- Discipline: International economics
- Institutions: Stockholm School of Economics (1947–1963); Lund University (1965–1976)

Torsten Waldemar Gårdlund (23 February 1911 – 21 February 2003) was a Swedish economist, economic historian, essayist and biographical writer. In economic history, he published several significant monographs, but also several works on individual Swedish industries. He was also active as a developing country advisor and wrote three books on development issues. Gårdlund was a professor at the Stockholm School of Economics from 1947 to 1963, and professor of international economics at Lund University from 1965 to 1976.

== Early life ==
Gårdlund was born on 23 February 1911 in Stockholm, Sweden, the son of MD Waldemar Gårdlund and his wife Gertrud (née Olsson). Gårdlund studied at the Stockholm School of Economics and Stockholm University College for teachers such as Bertil Ohlin, Sven Brisman and Alf Johansson, and came into contact with Gunnar Myrdal and Herbert Tingsten, but the one who strongly influenced him was Eli Heckscher. He graduated from the Stockholm School of Economics in 1932 and received a Bachelor of Arts degree in 1934. Sociology studies at the University of Chicago from 1934 to 1935 was also important for his view of society. During the 1930s and 1940s he was drawn into Stockholm's intellectual and political life. It was then that the specific Swedish social model began to take shape and the "Stockholm School" was recognized internationally.

== Career ==
Gårdlund worked as secretary in the Population Commission (Befolkningskommissionen) in 1936 and worked as a teaching assistant in economics at the Stockholm University College from 1937 to 1939 when he received a Licentiate of Philosophy degree. He was an editor in the Social-Democratic magazine Tiden from 1939 to 1944 and an expert in the National Labor Market Commission (Statens arbetsmarknadskommission) from 1940 to 1941. In 1942, Gårdlund received a Doctor of Philosophy degree and worked as a Docent at Stockholm University College. He was a professor of economics at Stockholm School of Economics from 1947 to 1963. Gårdlund was financial advisor in the Swedish Savings Bank Association (Svenska sparbanksföreningen) from 1947 to 1959 and an employee in financial matters in the Swedish newspaper Svenska Dagbladet from 1949 to 1996. He was an economic expert of the United Nations technical assistance activities in Morocco from 1958 to 1959. He was then head of United Nations technical assistance activities in Tunisia from 1960 to 1961 as well as financial adviser to the Ministry of Finance there (on behalf of the Ford Foundation) from 1963 to 1964. Gårdlund was professor of international economics at Lund University from 1965 to 1976.

== Personal life ==
In 1939 he married Ingrid Schmidt (born 1916), the daughter of August Schmidt and Elisabeth Eriksson. They divorced and in 1947 he married Ingrid Österling (born 1917), the daughter of A. Österling and Greta Sjöberg. They also divorced and in 1957 he married Anne-Margrethe Björlin (born 1921), the daughter of Olof Björlin and Elsa Rosén. Gårdlund was married a fourth time, to Susanna.
