= The Girl in the Rain (1955 film) =

1955 film

- Directed by: Alf Kjellin
- Written by: Sune Stigsjöö; Volodja Semitjov; Alf Kjellin
- Produced by: Rune Waldekranz
- Starring: Marianne Bengtsson; Alf Kjellin; Annika Tretow; Gunnel Lindblom
- Cinematography: Rune Ericson
- Edited by: Eric Nordemar
- Music by: Erland von Koch
- Production company: Sandrews
- Distributed by: Sandrew-Baumanfilm
- Release date: 2 May 1955
- Running time: 100 minutes
- Country: Sweden
- Language: Swedish

The Girl in the Rain (Swedish: Flickan i regnet) is a 1955 Swedish drama film directed by Alf Kjellin and starring Marianne Bengtsson, Kjellin, Annika Tretow and Gunnel Lindblom. It was shot at the Centrumateljéerna Studios in Stockholm. The film's sets were designed by the art director Nils Nilsson.

== Cast ==
- Marianne Bengtsson as Anna Rydell
- Alf Kjellin as Martin Andreasson
- Annika Tretow as Gerd Andreasson
- Gunnel Lindblom as Ingrid
- Märta Dorff as Matron
- Renée Björling as Maria, Principal
- Ingvar Kjellson as Klas
- Carl Ström as Johan, Teacher
- Arne Källerud as Karlsson, Janitor
- Kerstin Wibom as Ms. Linde
- Birgitta Andersson as Taje
- Pia Skoglund as Bisse
- Bibi Andersson as Lilly
- Mona Malm as Britt-Marie
- Ittla Frodi as Mirre
- Monica Nielsen as Ping-Pong
- Lena Söderblom as Burret
- Eva Laräng as Kerstin
- Elisabeth Liljenroth as Student
- Anne-Marie Hilton as Margareta
- Inger Axö as Birgitta
- Yvonne Axö as Marianne
- Birgitta Orling as Bibban
- Ing-Margret Lackne as Gunnel
- Barbro Dahlberg as Student
- Margareta Nyströmer as Agneta
- Ingrid Jellart as Beatrice 'Grynet' Hamilton
- Solveig Hedengran as Teacher at the Corridor

== Bibliography ==
- Qvist, Per Olov & von Bagh, Peter. Guide to the Cinema of Sweden and Finland. Greenwood Publishing Group, 2000.
