= Men of the Navy =

1943 film

- Directed by: Börje Larsson
- Written by: Hasse Ekman; Alvar Zacke
- Starring: Nils Kihlberg; Karl-Arne Holmsten; Anne-Margrethe Björlin
- Cinematography: Göran Strindberg
- Edited by: Lennart Wallén
- Music by: Jules Sylvain
- Production company: Sandrews
- Distributed by: Sandrew-Baumanfilm
- Release date: 23 January 1943
- Running time: 92 minutes
- Country: Sweden
- Language: Swedish

Men of the Navy (Swedish: Örlogsmän) is a 1943 Swedish drama and romance film directed by Börje Larsson and starring Nils Kihlberg, Karl-Arne Holmsten and Anne-Margrethe Björlin. The film's sets were designed by the art director Bibi Lindström.

== Cast ==
- Karl-Arne Holmsten as Arne Ramberg
- Nils Kihlberg as Erik Svensson
- Anne-Margrethe Björlin as Ingrid Peijer
- Emil Fjellström as August Sjöberg
- Fritiof Billquist as Captain Wall
- Gunnar Sjöberg as Engineer Kärre
- Hugo Björne as Commander Peijer
- Gustaf Torrestad as Second lieutenant Bernt
- Åke Uppström as Engine attendant Karlsson
- Artur Rolén as Skipper Hake
- Wiktor Kulörten Andersson as Boman
- Astrid Bodin as Selma Boman
- Åke Engfeldt as Flag cadet Klas Löfgren

== Bibliography ==
- Gustafsson, Fredrik. The Man from the Third Row: Hasse Ekman, Swedish Cinema and the Long Shadow of Ingmar Bergman. Berghahn Books, 2016.
