= Michael Pfleghar =

German film director (1933–1991)

- Born: 20 March 1933; Stuttgart, Germany
- Died: 23 June 1991 (aged 58); Düsseldorf, Germany
- Occupations: Film director Screenwriter
- Years active: 1954–1991

Michael Pfleghar (20 March 1933 – 23 June 1991) was a German film director and screenwriter. He directed 87 films and TV specials between 1956 and 1991. He died of suicide.

== Career ==
Born in Stuttgart, he was editor and from 1954 assistent director at the local public TV station Süddeutscher Rundfunk (SDR). He worked for Bavaria Film in Munich from 1959 to 1963, then became a freelancer soon known for his innovative shows.

Working in the US in 1967, he directed the show A Man and His Music + Ella + Jobim with Frank Sinatra, Ella Fitzgerald and Antônio Carlos Jobim and was living for some time with Tina Sinatra in Munich. By that time, he had been married to singers Bibi Johns (1960–1962) and Inge Brück (divorced end of 1960s) and had been dating Heidi Brühl. From 1981 to 1990 he was married to singer Wencke Myhre, son Michael was born in 1982. In the Visions of Eight directors covering the 1972 Summer Olympics in Munich, it was Pfleghar who directed The Women.

From 1969 to 1972 he directed the German-Austrian-Swiss ZDF-ORF-SRG TV show Wünsch Dir was (Make a Wish) that included innovative elements like Interactive television, Interactive television (narrative technique) and Televoting, as viewers in a pre-selected city could switch on electrical appliances in support of competing families. A technician of the local electrical grid operator then phoned in the readings of the city-wide power meter. It was also daring in several aspects, even when intended to be educating and promoting safety. In March 1971, two families inside an automobile were lowered into a pool with warm, clear water, with the horn honking dramatically. Most got out of their own in time, but the ladies behind the passenger door needed support of divers, stating afterwards, basically, "I nearly drowned but everything is fine", which was later parodied by Loriot. With families absent in the studio, artist Friedensreich Hundertwasser once painted their houses without prior consent. In November 1970, with ongoing "Sexual revolution", three families were asked whether their teenage daughter would be permitted to appear topless for a game. All denied, in the show, and even in private discussions that were filmed before with candid camera. That was seemingly not controversial yet. After other modern day tasks, like dealing with piles of garbage, family members had to predict which one of five costumes her teenage daughters would prefer to model in. Of the Stöhr family, parents and brother each picked "the one with pants", and the host Dietmar Schönherr added "that doesn't seem to be the most remarkable part of it" as the model also wore a transparent blouse and obviously no bra. In fact, the 17 year old daughter Leonie walked the catwalk in the same attire, stating in confident manner that this did not contradict the previous no topless decision and she was "covered and dressed, for sure". That part of the show caused criticism.

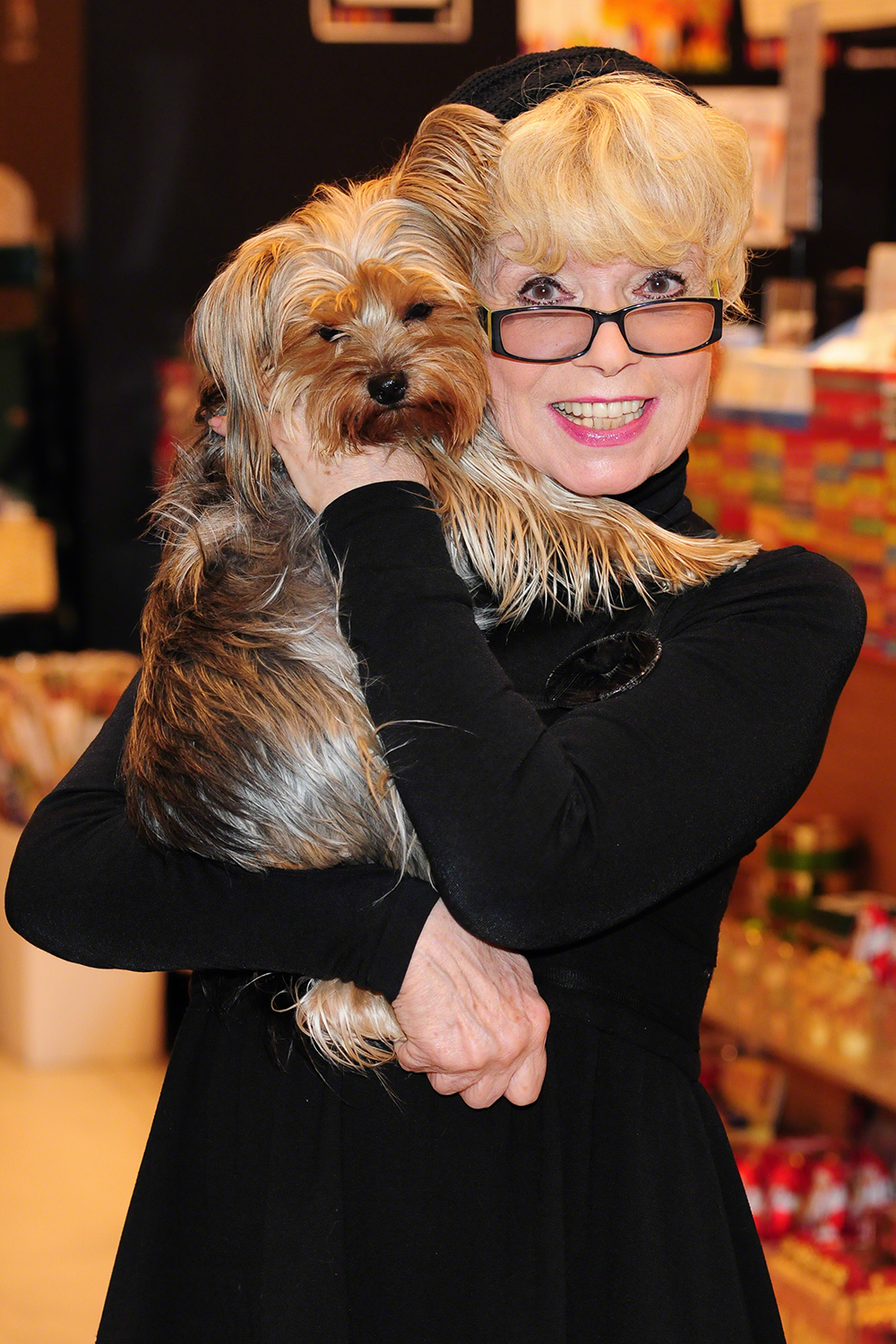
Ingrid Steeger (1947 – 2023)

For the general audience, Pfleghar is mainly known for the comedy TV series Klimbim (odds and ends, Rowan & Martin's Laugh-In) that ran from 1973 to 1979, featuring "Pythonesque" humor and star guests like Jerry Lewis and Curd Jürgens. One of the recurring gags was the Klimbim family, with youngest member Gaby Klimbim, a rowdy gap toothed teenager, played by former soft porn actress Ingrid Steeger who was dating Pfleghar from 1974 to 1979.

Pfleghar was in charge of Germany's most expensive TV show in 1986, Die Zukunft hat Geburtstag – 100 Jahre Automobil (Birthday of the Future - 100 Years Automobile). Costs of about 20 Million DM were mostly financed from Norwegian money by contacts of his wife Wencke Myhre. As many automobile brands were invited to participate, many demands were to meet. In addition, and starting late in October 1985, a multi language movie was made in several countries, featuring a time travelling glass automobile piloted by Niki Lauda, F1 World Champion, Boeing pilot, airline owner, but not an actor.

As the patent for the Benz Patent-Motorwagen was applied for on 29 January 1886, the TV show was to be broadcast live on 29 January 1986, from Stuttgart, his home, and that of Mercedes-Benz, Porsche, and Bosch. The day before, the Space Shuttle Challenger disaster occurred, and the birthday show not only obstructed the prime time slot, but run more than an hour late, delaying an expensive satellite link from Kennedy Space Center with Fritz Pleitgen due to report. In the presence of 4000 guests, many wary automobile CEOs suspicious of a Mercedes commercial, celebrities, ambassadors, and German President Richard von Weizsäcker, a parade of cars and people of many brands was performed, and music was performed. Instead of 25 minutes, the opening took an hour. Then, the 80 minute barely completed feature film was shown to the audience, instead of postponing it altogether. The event took nearly three hours and received negative reviews from the German press and from the automotive industry that was to be celebrated. All this possibly contributed to his suicide.

== Selected filmography ==
- Dead Woman from Beverly Hills (1964)
- Serenade for Two Spies (1965)
- How to Seduce a Playboy (1966)
- The Oldest Profession (1967, anthology film)
- Visions of Eight (1973, anthology film)

== Selected TV filmography ==
- Wünsch Dir was (Fernsehshow) (1969–1972, TV series)
- Klimbim (1973–1979, TV series)
- Zwei himmlische Töchter (1978, TV series)
- Die lieben Verwandten (1991, TV series)
