= Die lieben Verwandten =

- Created by: Michael Pfleghar
- Starring: Christiane Krüger
- Country of origin: Germany

Die lieben Verwandten is a German television series.

== Cast ==
- Otto Lüthje as Julius Söbenstern
- Erna Raupach-Peterser as Hermine Söbenstern
- Ulla Mahrt as Annie Söbenstern
- Günther Siegmund as Max Söbenstern
- Werner Riepel as Eduard Söbenstern
- Heidi Kabel as Doris Söbenstern
- Edgar Bessen as Karl Söbenstern
- Heini Kaufeld as Hinrich Kniep
- Henry Vahl as Amandus Gülschow
- Hanno Thurau as Fritz Knaack
- Hilde Sicks as Lina Dose

== Director ==
- Hans Mahler

== See also ==
- List of German television series
