= The Imperial German Dinner Service =

1983 novel by David Hughes

- First edition (publ. Legend Books)
- Author: David Hughes
- Language: English
- Publication date: 1983

The Imperial German Dinner Service is a 1983 novel by British writer David Hughes published by Constable, and republished by Paladin in 1987.

== Outline ==
The narrator, Roland Patcham, by his own introduction a “redundant… spoilt, angry, bored and aimless reporter”, is losing his younger wife Sophie (“a spoilt, well-off, beautiful and busy journalist”) to her lover, the Director of National Arts. Sophie uncovers the existence of a one-thousand-piece dinner service made for Kaiser Wilhelm II in 1914, a Wedgwood set which depicts an enormous range of typically English urban, village and pastoral scenes, and which has been forgotten if not irretrievably lost throughout the course of two world wars. Patcham becomes obsessed with retrieving the surviving pieces, all the more so that his rival, Courtney Ranston, has already become engaged in their collection on behalf of the nation. Rummaging through South-East England, Belgium, Holland, France, Denmark, Sweden and finally Iceland, sparring with a carnival of eccentric characters, Patcham manages to outflank and defeat the National Arts, and in so doing win back his wife. The Dinner Service is quickly established as a metaphor for a destroyed past, both in the sense of an “olde Englande”, and in the joy of youthful love, and its partial restoration – both rediscovery and repair – describes the mitigated reconquest of love.
