= Göran Lindgren =

Swedish film producer

- Born: 5 November 1927; Stockholm, Sweden
- Died: 2 June 2012 (aged 84)
- Occupation: Film producer
- Years active: 1964-1975

Göran Lindgren (5 November 1927 – 2 June 2012) was a Swedish film producer. He produced 32 films between 1964 and 1975.

During the 1950s, Lindgren ran a consulting and agent business for well-known Swedish actors, directors, artists, writers and journalists. In 1963 he became assistant director and producer at Sandrews and from 1965 managing director of Sandrew Film & Teater AB.

In 1989, he was succeeded by Klas Olofsson but remained responsible for the theater business for a few years. Sandrew's theaters Intiman, Vasateatern and Oscarsteatern were sold in 1998. Göran Lindgren was married in 1949–1985 to the costume designer Gertie Johnson. He is buried in the memorial grove at Galärvarv Cemetery in Stockholm.

== Selected filmography ==
- Loving Couples (1964)
- People Meet and Sweet Music Fills the Heart (1967)
- Hugo and Josephine (1967)
- Badarna (1968)
- The Girls (1968)
- Harry Munter (1969)
- Blushing Charlie (1970)
- Brother Carl (1971)
- Giliap (1975)
