= The Stranger from the Sky =

1956 film

- Directed by: Rolf Husberg
- Written by: Linda Larsson (novel); Rolf Husberg
- Produced by: Rune Waldekranz
- Starring: Marianne Bengtsson; Alf Kjellin; Georg Funkquist
- Cinematography: Curt Jonsson
- Edited by: Arne Löfgren
- Music by: Gösta Theselius
- Production company: Sandrews
- Distributed by: Sandrew-Baumanfilm
- Release date: 27 February 1956
- Running time: 83 minutes
- Country: Sweden
- Language: Swedish

The Stranger from the Sky (Swedish: Främlingen från skyn) is a 1956 Swedish thriller film directed by Rolf Husberg and starring Marianne Bengtsson, Alf Kjellin and Georg Funkquist. It was shot at the Centrumateljéerna Studios in Stockholm. The film's sets were designed by the art director Nils Nilsson.

== Synopsis ==
After a plane crash in Northern Sweden, a local girl believes she has seen a survivor in the woods but nobody else believes her.

== Cast ==
- Marianne Bengtsson as Lo
- Alf Kjellin as Stig Hallman
- Günther Hüttmann as The Stranger
- Georg Funkquist as Erik Fridman
- Arne Källerud as Bror Eneflod
- Sif Ruud as Elin Lundgren
- Lars Elldin as Björn Lundgren
- Gull Natorp as Actress
- Meg Westergren as Mrs. Wahlström, newlywed
- Gösta Prüzelius as Mr. Wahlström, newlywed couple
- David Stein as Scientist
- Herbert Curiel as Pilot
- Helge Hagerman as Policeman
- Margit Andelius as Woman in the village
- Astrid Bodin as Woman in the village
- Tor Borong as Hermansson, local militia
- Sven-Axel Carlsson as Kalle, local militia
- Märta Dorff as Train passenger
- Sune Elffors as Warder
- Carl-Axel Elfving as Train passenger
- Ivar Hallbäck as Constable
- Birger Lensander as Worker
- Carin Lundquist as Woman in the village
- Wilma Malmlöf as Emma
- Gösta Petersson as Doctor
- Hanny Schedin as Mrs. Hermansson
- Sture Ström as Policeman
- Bengt Sundmark as Man
- Allan Sundwall as Sandvik, policeman
- Ivar Wahlgren as Constable
- Birger Åsander as Ville, peasant

== Bibliography ==
- Qvist, Per Olov & von Bagh, Peter. Guide to the Cinema of Sweden and Finland. Greenwood Publishing Group, 2000.
