= The Virgin Spring =

1960 film by Ingmar Bergman

- Theatrical release poster by Anders Gullberg
- Directed by: Ingmar Bergman
- Written by: Ulla Isaksson
- Produced by: Ingmar Bergman; Allan Ekelund
- Starring: Max von Sydow; Birgitta Valberg; Gunnel Lindblom; Birgitta Pettersson
- Cinematography: Sven Nykvist
- Edited by: Oscar Rosander
- Music by: Erik Nordgren
- Distributed by: Svensk Filmindustri
- Release date: 8 February 1960
- Running time: 89 minutes
- Country: Sweden
- Language: Swedish
- Box office: $700,000 (USA)

The Virgin Spring (Swedish: Jungfrukällan) is a 1960 Swedish period tragedy film directed by Ingmar Bergman. Set in medieval Sweden, it is a tale about a father's merciless response to the rape and murder of his young daughter. The story was adapted by screenwriter Ulla Isaksson from the 13th-century Swedish ballad "Töres döttrar i Wänge" ("Töre's daughters in Vänge"). Bergman researched the legend of Per Töre with an eye to an adaptation, considering an opera before deciding on a film version. Given criticism of the historical accuracy of his 1957 film The Seventh Seal, he also invited Isaksson to write the screenplay. Other influences included the 1950 Japanese film Rashomon. Max von Sydow played Töre.

Isaksson and Bergman explored a number of themes in The Virgin Spring, questioning morals, vengeance, and religious beliefs. The rape scene was also subject to controversy and censorship in screenings in the United States.

The film won the Academy Award for Best Foreign Language Film at the 1961 Academy Awards and other honours. It was also the basis for the 1972 exploitation horror film The Last House on the Left.

== Plot ==
In medieval Sweden, prosperous Christian Per Töre sends his daughter, Karin, to take candles to the church, a day's journey away. Karin is accompanied by servant Ingeri, who is pregnant with an out-of-wedlock child, and who secretly worships the Norse deity Odin. Along their way through the forest on horseback, Ingeri becomes frightened when they come to a stream-side mill and admonishes Karin, but Karin chooses to proceed on her own, leaving Ingeri at the mill.

Ingeri encounters a one-eyed man at the mill. When Ingeri asks his name he enigmatically responds he has none "in these days". The man tells Ingeri that he can see and hear things others cannot. When the man makes sexual advances towards her and promises her power, Ingeri flees in terror. Meanwhile, Karin meets three herdsmen, two men and a boy, and invites them to eat her lunch with her. Eventually, the two older men rape and murder Karin. Ingeri, after having caught up to the group, witnesses the whole ordeal from a distance. The two older men then prepare to leave the scene with Karin's clothing. The younger boy is left with the body, but he takes the situation poorly, and is wracked with guilt. He even tries to bury the body by sprinkling dirt but stops midway, and runs along with the older men.

The herders then, unknowingly, seek shelter at the home of the murdered girl. During the night, one of the goat herders offers to sell Karin's clothes to her mother, Märeta, and she suspects the worst. After they fall asleep, the mother locks the trio in the dining chamber and reveals her suspicions to Töre. Töre prepares to discover the truth about the situation and encounters Ingeri, who has returned. She breaks down in front of Töre and tells him about the rape and murder. She confesses that she secretly wished for Karin's death out of jealousy. In a fit of rage, Töre decides to murder the herdsmen at the crack of dawn. He stabs one of the older men to death with a butcher knife and throws the other into the fire. He kills the boy too, lifting and hurling him against the wall, while his wife watches horrified.

Soon after, Karin's parents, along with the members of their household, set out to find their daughter's body with Ingeri leading the way. Töre breaks down on seeing Karin's body and calls upon God. He vows that, although he cannot understand why God would allow such a thing to happen, he will build a church at the site of his daughter's death. As her parents lift Karin's body from the ground, a spring emerges from the spot where her head rested. Ingeri proceeds to wash herself with the water while Karin's mother cleans the dirt from her daughter's face.

== Cast ==
- Max von Sydow – Töre
- Birgitta Valberg – Märeta
- Gunnel Lindblom – Ingeri
- Birgitta Pettersson – Karin
- Axel Düberg – Thin Herdsman
- Tor Isedal – Mute Herdsman
- Allan Edwall – Beggar
- Ove Porath – Boy
- Axel Slangus – Bridge Keeper
- Gudrun Brost – Frida
- Oscar Ljung – Simon

== Themes ==
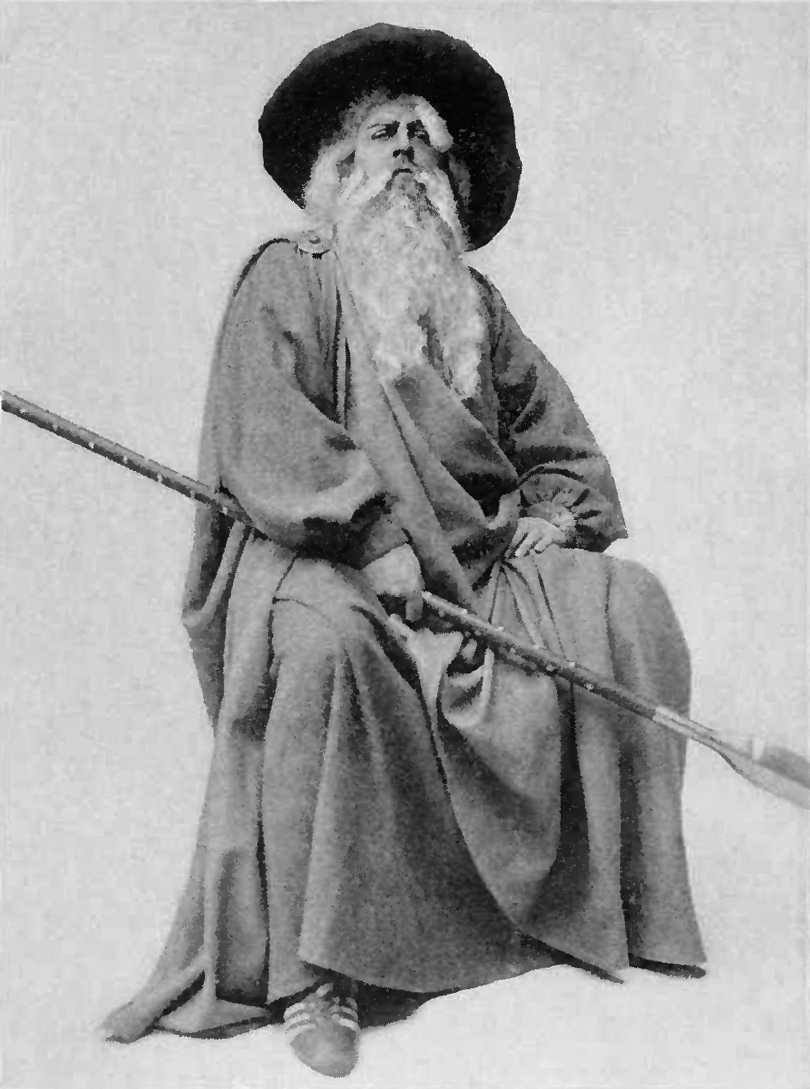
The Norse god Odin is prominent in the film's themes.

A variety of themes explored in the film include Christianity, Paganism, Norse mythology, feelings of guilt, vengeance, the questioning of religious faith and sexual innocence. All of the characters struggle with feelings of guilt: Ingeri for praying to Odin and standing by during the murder, Märeta for disliking Töre and wanting to be Karin's favourite parent, and Töre for killing the boy.

Many of the religious themes centre on conflict between paganism and Christianity, recalling the misery Sweden experienced as the two religions struggled for predominance. In the film, paganism is associated with magic spells, envy and revenge. In a possible interpretation, Odin in this film becomes synonymous with the Devil. The Bridge-Keeper is given the attributes of Odin; keeping a pet raven, lacking an eye and a high seat with seemingly ocular powers alluding to the Hlidskjalf of Norse Mythology. As with The Seventh Seal, Bergman relies on the emotions and inner conflicts of his characters to represent spiritual crisis. Töre, played by Max von Sydow, loses his Christian values to commit the act of revenge, and offers to build a church as penance. Film scholar Marc Gervais elaborated that Töre's revenge is "ritualized pagan vengeance", adding "Töre is torn between two ritualized imperatives: pagan vengeance, Christian repentance and forgiveness". Gervais commented on how it compared to William Shakespeare's Macbeth in its themes of "embracing the dark forces, succumbing to evil, and being overwhelmed by conscience".

Consistent with fairy tales, Karin and Ingeri are presented as opposites, Karin as an innocent virgin who always appears clean and in fine clothing. In contrast, Ingeri is dirty, dark in complexion, rides a darker horse, and her pregnancy indicates compromised innocence. The rape scene represents Karin losing her innocence, with her appearance afterward being disordered.

Screenwriter Ulla Isaksson viewed the spring as symbolizing Karin's innocence. Ingeri uses it to wash her head, which she used to plan the spell, and her eyes, which she used to watch the rape, and drinks the water, symbolizing absolution. Critic Peter Cowie tied the spring in with Ingeri's fire in the opening and streams seen throughout the film as representing "The pagan significance of fire, earth, and water".

== Production ==
=== Development ===
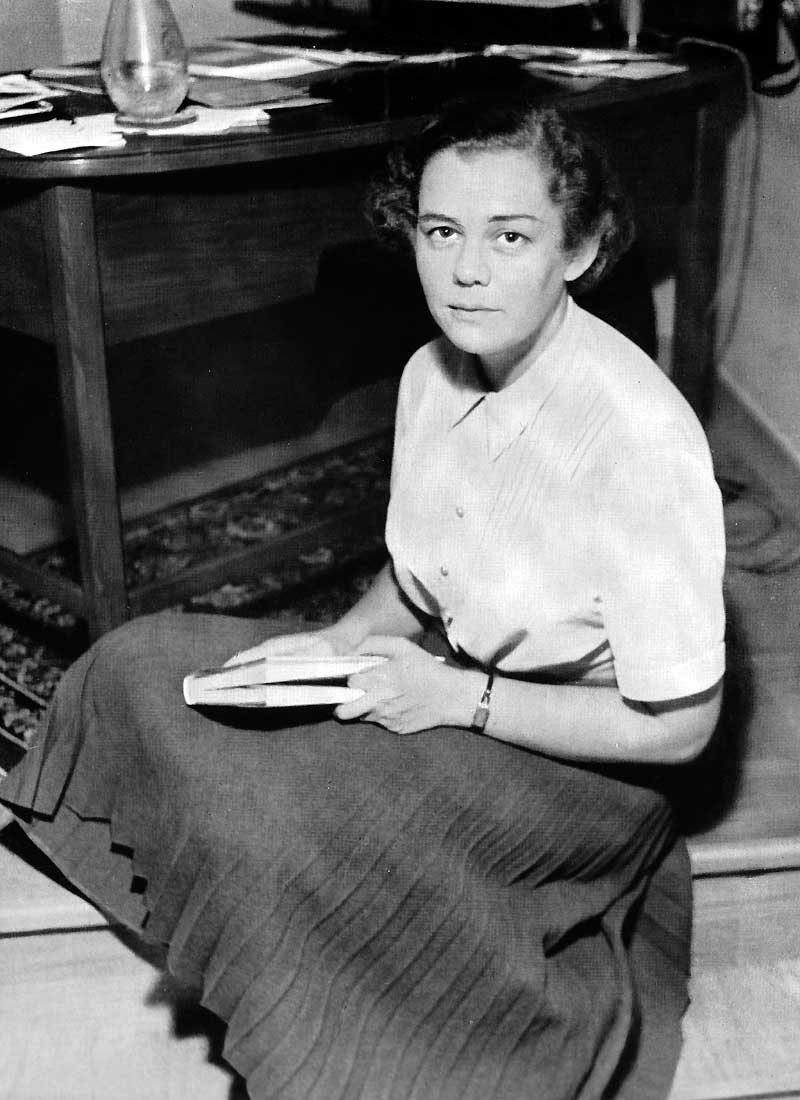
Novelist Ulla Isaksson wrote the screenplay, particularly interested in questions of faith.

Director Ingmar Bergman first read about the legend of Per Töre, who had seven daughters who fell victim to seven rapists, as a student, and felt it was ideal for adaptation. He had proposed it as a ballet for the Royal Swedish Opera or as a play, but decided a film would be most suitable while making Wild Strawberries. For adaptation, Bergman chose "Töres döttrar i Wänge" as among the simplest of the ballads about Töre.

New influences came from Japanese cinema, with Bergman particularly being a fan of Rashomon (1950). He later referred to The Virgin Spring as "a wretched imitation of Kurosawa". Bergman chose novelist Ulla Isaksson as screenwriter. Isaksson had written a novel set in medieval times and was acclaimed for its realism, which Bergman felt might prevent repeat of some criticisms of his 1957 film The Seventh Seal. In writing the screenplay, Isaksson was most interested in exploring conflicts between Christianity and paganism, while Bergman wanted to dissect guilt.

Svensk Filmindustri required Bergman to make a comedy before agreeing to produce The Virgin Spring; the comedy became The Devil's Eye.

=== Filming ===
By the time The Virgin Spring began production, Bergman's relationship with his usual cinematographer Gunnar Fischer was strained, due to Bergman's abrasiveness. When Fischer found another project to work on, Bergman replaced him with Sven Nykvist, who became his regular collaborator. In shooting The Virgin Spring, Nykvist favoured more natural lighting than Fischer had.

Bergman said that in filming the rape scene:

It shows the crime in its naked atrocity, forcing us, in shocked desperation, to leave aesthetic enjoyment of a work of art for passionate involvement in a human drama of crime that breeds new crime, of guilt and grace ... We must not hesitate in our portrayal of human degradation, even if, in our demand for truth, we must violate certain taboos.

== Release ==
The film premiered in Stockholm on 8 February 1960, where 15 audience members walked out during the screening, and several left weeping. Although Svensk Filmindustri accountants previously often faulted Bergman films as unprofitable, they acknowledged The Virgin Spring was a success. The film was also screened at the Cannes Film Festival in May 1960.

In the United States, The Virgin Spring opened in New York City on 14 November 1960, censored to remove shots taken of Karin's naked legs around the body of the rapist. In Fort Worth, Texas, the film was banned as obscene, and the Texas Supreme Court declined to hear the case. The Criterion Collection released the film on DVD in Region 1 in January 2006 and re-released the film on Blu-ray in June 2018.

== Reception ==
=== Critical reception ===
The film received mixed reviews in Sweden, with Svenska Dagbladet publishing a review stating "It hits home like a fist between the eyes". In contrast, the Stockholms-Tidningen wrote Isaksson was better suited for print than film, where she was weak. Aftonbladet's review called it "somewhat loose in execution".

There was some controversy among U.S. critics. In a 1960 review, Bosley Crowther wrote, "Mr. Bergman has stocked it with scenes of brutality that, for sheer unrestrained realism, may leave one sickened and stunned. As much as they may contribute to the forcefulness of the theme, they tend to disturb the senses out of proportion to the dramatic good they do". Stanley Kauffmann wrote that "The vengeance scene is so long that it verges on the ridiculous". Dwight Macdonald questioned why God would create a spring instead of resurrecting Karin. The film was included in the San Francisco Chronicle's "Hot 100 Films From the Past" in 1997.

In 2011, author Alexandra Heller-Nicholas wrote The Virgin Spring gave "a relatively auspicious heritage" to rape and revenge films, and was "an art classic" with "sumptuous black and white cinematography", and that the reuse of the story in The Last House on the Left (1972) indicated "remarkable longevity" for the plot. Robin Wood wrote, "The Virgin Spring is Art; Last House is Exploitation". Leonard Maltin, giving The Virgin Spring three stars in his 2013 Movie Guide and calling it "Fascinating, beautifully made", felt it was more proper to say The Last House on the Left "ripped off" Bergman's film than remade it. The film was a major influence on Taiwanese director Ang Lee and American film maker Wes Craven.

Rotten Tomatoes, a review aggregator, also reports 88% approval among 25 surveyed critics, with an average rating of 8/10.

=== Accolades ===
The film won the Academy Award for Best Foreign Language Film, marking the first time Bergman won the award. The film was also entered into competition for the Palme d'Or at the 1960 Cannes Film Festival.

Award	Date of ceremony	Category	Recipient(s)	Result	Ref(s)
Academy Awards	17 April 1961	Best Foreign Language Film	Sweden	Won	
Academy Awards	17 April 1961	Best Costume Design, Black and White	Marik Vos	Nominated	
Cannes Film Festival	4–20 May 1960	Special Mention	Ingmar Bergman	Won	
Cannes Film Festival	4–20 May 1960	FIPRESCI Prize	Ingmar Bergman	Won	
Golden Globe Awards	16 March 1961	Best Foreign Language Film	The Virgin Spring	Won	

== See also ==
- Middle Ages in film
- List of historical drama films
- List of submissions to the 33rd Academy Awards for Best Foreign Language Film
- List of Swedish submissions for the Academy Award for Best Foreign Language Film
