= Töres döttrar i Wänge =

Swedish medieval ballad

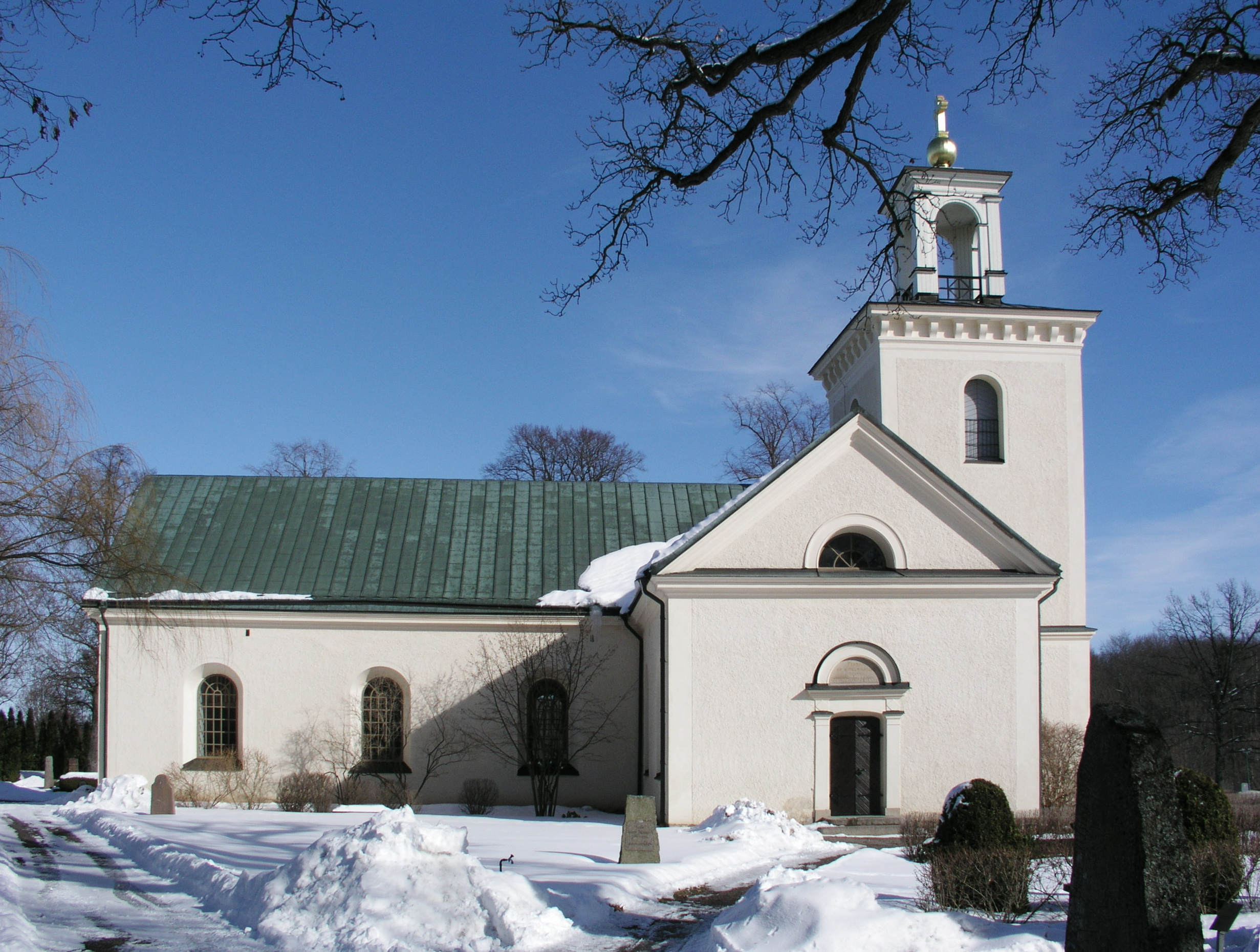
The church of Kärna. The ballad relates the tradition of why the church was built.

"Töres döttrar i Wänge" ("Töre's daughters in Vänge") or "Per Tyrssons döttrar i Vänge" ("Per Tyrsson's daughters in Vänge") is a medieval Swedish ballad (SMB 47; TSB B 21), upon which Ingmar Bergman's 1960 film The Virgin Spring is partly based. The ballad type is found throughout Scandinavia, with variants in Danish (DgF 338), Faroese (CCF 176), Icelandic (IFkv 15), and Norwegian (NMB 49). The Child Ballad "Babylon" is analogous to the Scandinavian songs.

== Story ==
The ballad, which tells the traditional, local legend about why the 12th-century church in Kärna (near Malmslätt in Östergötland, Sweden) was built, was still being sung in the early 19th century, when Erik Gustaf Geijer and Arvid August Afzelius were collecting songs for their three-volume 800-page work Svenska folk-visor från forntiden ("Ancient Swedish folksongs"), published 1814 and 1816.

The ballad appears in the third volume, in three versions: the one sung by Greta Naterberg for Afzelius' and Geijer's assistants "J. H." and "D. S. Wallman" in 1812, and two older versions found in manuscript in the Swedish Royal Library; the first accompanied by the note "Pehr Jonson in Frisle sung this song in June 1673". The second is very similar, but has a different refrain and links the song to the nearby church of Kaga instead of Kärna.

The gist of the story is clearer in the 1673 version, which is longer than the one recorded in 1812: The three daughters of Pehr Tyrsson (Töre) and his wife Karin, are killed by three highwaymen when on their way to church. Three wells spring up where the three maidens are killed. The men later visit the family farm and try to sell the girls' silk shirts. Karin recognises them and realises that the daughters must have been killed by the men, so she tells her husband. He kills two of them, but lets the third live. When he and Karin ask the surviving highwayman who they are and where they come from, he tells them that they were brothers who had been sent away by their parents when very young, to fend for themselves in the world, and that their parents were Töre and Karin in Vänge. Realizing that he has killed his own sons, Töre then vows to build a church to atone for his sins.

According to the notes preceding the ballad, the well of Vänge (Vänge brunn), which appeared at the spot where the young maidens lost their heads, still existed in the 17th century, according to a manuscript from 1673, and an old smithy in the forest nearby was held to be haunted at midnight by the apparitions of the young girls.

A note after the song recorded in 1812 states that the singer, Greta Naterberg, had told the recorders that "vallare" (which usually is understood to mean "herdsmen") here means "robbers" or "highwaymen".

== Localization ==
Besides Östergötland, the ballad and legend have been localized to several other places in Sweden, as well as in the other Scandinavian countries. According to Francis James Child, the story has been connected with "half a dozen localities in Sweden" and (citing Svend Grundtvig) "at least eight [in] Denmark".

== Ballad ==
The version of the ballad sung by Greta Naterberg in 1812, as recorded by assistants J. H. and/or D. S. Wallman and printed in Svenska folkvisor från forntiden vol. 3 (1816):

Pehr Tyrssons döttrar i Vänge, Kaller var deras skog de sufvo en sömn för länge. Medan skogen han lövas Först vaknade den yngsta, Kaller var... Så väckte hon upp de andra Medan skogen... (the rest is shown without the refrain) Så satte de sig på sänge-stock. Så flätade de hvarandras lock. Så togo de på sina silkesklä'r. Så gingo de sig åt kyrkan. Men när som de kommo på Vängelid Der möta dem tre Vallare. "Ant'en vill J bli' Wallare-vif, Eller vill J mista Ert unga lif?" "Inte villa vi bli' Vallarevif, Heldre vi miste vårt unga lif." De höggo deras hufvu'n på björke-stock, Så rann der strax tre källor opp. Kroppen grofvo de ner i dy. Kläderna buro de fram till by. När som de kommo till Vänga gård, Ute för dem fru Karin står. "Och vill J köpa silkes särkar, Som nio jungfrur ha' stickat å virkat?" "Lös upp Edra säckar och låten mig se, Kan hända jag tör känna dem alla tre." Fru Karin slog sig för sitt bröst, Hon gångar för Pehr Tyreson opp "Det håller tre Wallare upå vår gård, De hafva gjort af med döttrarne vår." Pehr Tyrsson ta'r sitt svärd i hand, Han högg ihjäl de äldsta två. Den tredje lät han lefva Tills han fick honom fråga: "Hvad heter eder Fader? Hvad heter eder Moder?" "Vår fader, Pehr Tyrsson i Vänge, Vår moder fru Karin i Stränge." Pehr Tyrsson går sig åt smedjan, Han lät smidja sig jern om medjan "Hvad ska' vi nu göra för syndamehn?" "Vi ska' bygga en kyrka af kalk å sten. Den kyrkan skall heta Kerna Den skall vi bygga upp så gerna."	Pehr Tyrsson's daughters in Vänge Cold was their forest They slept a sleep too long While the forest came into leaf The youngest one woke up first Cold was... And so she woke up the others. While the forest... Then they sat up on their beds. So they braided each other's locks. So they put on their silken clothes. So they went to the church. But when they came to the Vänge hill They met three highwaymen "You either be highwaymen's wives, Or would you lose your young lives?" "We do not wish to be highwaymen's wives, We'd rather lose our young lives." They cut their heads off on a log of birch. There soon three wells sprung up. The bodies they buried in the mud, The clothes they carried into town. When they came to Vänge farm, Lady Karin met them in the yard "And would you buy silken shifts, By nine maidens knitted and stitched?" "Untie your sacks and let me see, Perhaps I know them all three." Lady Karin beat her chest, And went to find Pehr Tyresson. "There are three highwaymen in our yard, Who have our daughters slain." Pehr Tyrsson grasped his sword, He slew the eldest two. The third he left alive, And then he asked him thus: "What is your father's name? What is your mother's name?" "Our father: Pehr Tyrsson in Vänge, Our mother: Lady Karin in Stränge." Pehr Tyrson then went to the smithy, And had iron crafted 'round his waist. "What shall we do for our sins?" "We shall build a church of lime and stone. That church will be named Kerna, And we will eagerly build it."

== See also ==
- The Virgin Spring, a Swedish film based on the ballad.
