= Visions of Eight =

1973 documentary film

- Film poster
- Directed by: Miloš Forman; Claude Lelouch; Yuri Ozerov; Mai Zetterling; Kon Ichikawa; John Schlesinger; Arthur Penn; Michael Pfleghar
- Written by: David Hughes; Deliara Ozerowa; Shuntaro Tanikawa
- Produced by: Stan Margulies
- Cinematography: Arthur Wooster; Alan Hume; Daniel Bocly; Michael J. Davis; Rune Ericson; Walter Lassally; Jorgen Persson; Igor Slabnevich; Ernst Wild; Masuo Yamaguchi
- Edited by: Dede Allen; Catherine Bernard; Jim Clark; Lars Hagstrom; Edward Roberts
- Music by: Henry Mancini
- Distributed by: Cinema 5
- Release date: August 10, 1973
- Running time: 110 minutes
- Country: United States
- Language: English

Visions of Eight is a 1973 American documentary film offering a stylized look at the 1972 Summer Olympics. Produced by Stan Margulies and executive produced by David L. Wolper, it was directed by eight directors. It was screened out-of-competition at the 1973 Cannes Film Festival. It was later shown as part of the Cannes Classics section of the 2013 Cannes Film Festival. Some visuals of the Munich stadium from the documentary were used in Without Limits.

== Production ==
Wolper asked eight directors to select their own crews and create a segment which would capture some aspect of the Munich Games.

- Yuri Ozerov directed The Beginning
- Mai Zetterling directed The Strongest
- Arthur Penn directed The Highest
- Michael Pfleghar directed The Women
- Kon Ichikawa directed The Fastest
- Miloš Forman directed The Decathlon
- Claude Lelouch directed The Losers
- John Schlesinger directed The Longest

Alan Hume shot the segment The Fastest for director Kon Ichikawa. Arthur Wooster shot The Longest for director John Schlesinger, and Walter Lassally directed the photography for Arthur Penn's segment The Highest.

== Reception ==
Visions of Eight won the best documentary award at the Golden Globe Awards, held in 1974 for films which were released in 1973.

Peter Rainer of Bloomberg News wrote that, "Schlesinger's is the only segment that fully acknowledges the Black September terrorist attacks, in which 11 Israeli athletes and coaches, and a West German policeman, were murdered."

Rainer continues, "Penn's entry begins daringly. Not only is the imagery a slo-mo crawl, it's also out of focus and the soundtrack is silent. Gradually the visuals sharpen, the stadium sounds come up, but, for the most part, the pole vaulters rising into the sky remain superslow abstractions. Along with his great editor Dede Allen, who cut Bonnie and Clyde, Penn anatomizes the action without ever losing sight of the fact that these athletes, including USA's Bob Seagren, are men and not gods (as Riefenstahl might have us believe)" — referring to Leni Riefenstahl's 1938 documentary Olympia.

Rainer sees French director Claude Lelouch's segment as a welcome contrast to the other directors' worshipful heroic depictions: "Lelouch's The Losers ... shows us a boxer who rants in the ring after his defeat; wrestlers gamely trying to fight after tearing ligaments and dislocating limbs; swimmers treading befuddled in the pool after their last losing lap."

== Availability ==
It is available at the Criterion Collection as part of the 100 Years of Olympic Films box set. It became available as a standalone release on June 22, 2021.
