= Marianne Bengtsson =

Swedish actress (1937–2005)

- Born: 15 June 1937; Västervik, Sweden
- Died: 30 April 2005 (aged 67); Västervik, Sweden
- Occupation: Actress
- Years active: 1955–1959 (film)

Marianne Bengtsson (1937–2005) was a Swedish film actress. She enjoyed a brief career as a star in the 1950s before marrying a journalist and retiring from acting. She appeared in eight films during her career, usually in leading roles.

== Filmography ==
- Men in the Dark (1955)
- The Girl in the Rain (1955)
- The Stranger from the Sky (1956)
- The Song of the Scarlet Flower (1956)
- The Biscuit (1956)
- Night Light (1957)
- The Great Amateur (1958)
- Only a Waiter (1959)

== Bibliography ==
- Gustafsson, Fredrik. The Man from the Third Row: Hasse Ekman, Swedish Cinema and the Long Shadow of Ingmar Bergman. Berghahn Books, 2016.
- Qvist, Per Olov & von Bagh, Peter. Guide to the Cinema of Sweden and Finland. Greenwood Publishing Group, 2000.
