= Souvenir (1988 film) =

1988 film by Geoffrey Reeve

Souvenir is a 1988 British drama film directed by Geoffrey Reeve and starring Christopher Plummer, Catherine Hicks and Michael Lonsdale. It was based on the novel The Pork Butcher by David Hughes. Forty years after the Second World War, an ex-German soldier returns as an American to a French village in which atrocities were committed by the Nazis, during which his then French lover was murdered. The film, like the book, is an attempt to attribute and assuage patent and discrete levels of guilt.

== Cast ==
- Christopher Plummer as Ernst Kestner
- Catherine Hicks as Tina Boyer
- Michael Lonsdale as Xavier Lorion
- Christopher Cazenove as William Root
- Patrick Bailey as Young Ernst Kestner
- Jean Badin as Henri Boyer
- Lisa Daniely as Mme. Lorion
- Amélie Pick as Janni
