= Gentleman with a Briefcase =

1943 film

- Directed by: Ragnar Arvedson
- Written by: Fritz Thorén; Ragnar Arvedson
- Starring: Georg Rydeberg; Irma Christenson; Anne-Margrethe Björlin
- Cinematography: Elner Åkesson
- Edited by: Gösta Bjurman
- Music by: Lars-Erik Larsson
- Production company: AB Films
- Distributed by: Svensk Talfilm
- Release date: 30 November 1943
- Running time: 86 minutes
- Country: Sweden
- Language: Swedish

Gentleman with a Briefcase (Swedish: Herre med portfölj) is a 1943 Swedish drama film directed by Ragnar Arvedson and starring Georg Rydeberg, Irma Christenson and Anne-Margrethe Björlin. It was shot at the Centrumateljéerna Studios in Stockholm. The film's sets were designed by the art director Bertil Duroj.

== Synopsis ==
Rolf Berger, the titular "gentleman with the briefcase", is a respected judge who has been married to Eva for a number of years. He encounters the much younger Inger and falls in love with her.

== Cast ==
- Georg Rydeberg as Rolf Berger
- Irma Christenson as Eva
- Anne-Margrethe Björlin as Inger Alinder
- Stig Järrel as Manager Bexell
- Alf Kjellin as Lennart Dalén
- Åke Claesson as Recording Clerk
- Hugo Björne as Master of Court Appeal
- Bengt Ekerot as Stig
- Olav Riégo as Justice of Appeal
- Ragnar Widestedt as Doctor
- Anders Nyström as Gunnar, Berger's Son
- Alicia Lignell as Gerd, Berger's Daughter
- Olof Widgren as Alvar Quarnström
- Sven Bergvall as Master of Court Appeal
- Julie Bernby as Shop Assistant
- Eivor Engelbrektsson as Shop Assistant
- Artur Cederborgh as Conductor
- Georg Fernqvist as Porter
- Inga-Lill Åhström as Aina
- Karl Erik Flens as Lennart's Friend
- Jullan Kindahl as Boarding house hostess
- Sven Lindberg as Assessor
- Nina Scenna as Nurse
- Anna-Stina Wåglund as Nurse
- Åke Uppström as Waiter

== Bibliography ==
- Qvist, Per Olov & von Bagh, Peter. Guide to the Cinema of Sweden and Finland. Greenwood Publishing Group, 2000.
