= Anne-Margrethe Björlin =

Swedish film actress (1921–2006)

- Born: 13 July 1921; Karlshamn, Blekinge County, Sweden
- Died: 7 October 2006 (aged 85); Mariefred, Södermanland County, Sweden
- Occupation: Actress
- Years active: 1941–1953

Anne-Margrethe Björlin (1921–2006) was a Swedish film actress. She played several female leads during the 1940s, and also appeared in supporting roles. After making her last film in 1953 she became a fashion consultant. She was married to the Swedish economist Torsten Gårdlund in 1957.

== Selected filmography ==
- The Fight Continues (1941)
- Men of the Navy (1943)
- She Thought It Was Him (1943)
- Gentleman with a Briefcase (1943)
- Sin (1948)
- Bohus Battalion (1949)
- Playing Truant (1949)
- My Name Is Puck (1951)
- In the Arms of the Sea (1951)
- Unmarried Mothers (1953)
