= Morsarvet =

- Written by: Solveig Ternström
- Directed by: Staffan Roos
- Starring: see below
- Theme music composer: Johan Söderqvist
- Countries of origin: Sweden; Norway
- Original language: Swedish
- No. of episodes: 7

Production
- Producers: Lasse Ernst; Solveig Ternström
- Cinematography: Peter Fischer; Roland Lundin
- Editors: Carina Hellberg; Thomas Holéwa
- Running time: 55 min. (per episode)

Original release
- Network: SVT
- Release: 16 November – 28 December 1993

Morsarvet is a 1993 Swedish mini series directed by Staffan Roos written by, and starring, Solveig Ternström.

The series was televised on Sveriges television in late 1993.

== Plot summary ==
The series is set in 1940 during World War II. It is a modern version of Gösta Berlings Saga, with several hints to the novel in style and story but it is not based on the novel. Several characters are real, or based on real people, as the series is based on Solveig Ternström's own experiences growing up close to the border during the war.

== Cast ==
- Solveig Ternström as Lilly Amundsen, a Norwegian woman on the run from the Nazis. She and her children take the protection of his mother's house in Sweden.
- Stig Torstensson as Albin, Lilly's alcoholic brother and member of the infamous Munkfors Gang.
- Paula Ternström as Ada Amundsen, Lilly's traumatized daughter.
- Øystein Riise Naess as Ola Amundsen, Ada's brother.
- Sven Lindberg, Johan, Lillys stepfather. He is obsessed with hunting down the White Moose.
- Elaine Sjöberg as Beda, a wise old lady
- Edvard Olsson, Helmer, A sympathetic Swedish man who fall in love with Lilly.
- Mats Berglund, Odd Engström, Lennart Eldsfors, Bengt-Arne Ericsson, Bengt Berg, Thor Eriksson, Peter Jankert and Leif Persson as The Munkfors Gang, a group of natives similar to The 12 Cavaliers in Gösta Berlings Saga.
- Björn Söderbäck as Country Fiscal Henningson, A sinister Nazi-sympathizer.
- Hans Sandqvist as Mörkermannen (The Dark Man), a spirit representing the forces of darkness. He appears to several characters, mostly to Ada but also to The Munkfors Gang, Lilly and several others.
- Peter Stormare Colonel Bergkvist, a Swedish colonel in desperate need of winter uniforms for his troops.
- Johan Rabaeus as The Stranger, an alcoholic Nazi.
- Lars Löfgren as a mysterious Swedish Nazi who terrorizes Lilly on a train.
- Torsten Wahlund as Arne Amundsen, Lilly's husband and a captain in the Norwegian Army.
- Ketil Høegh as Guldbransen, a man trying to sell "nigger-gold" to people at a market.

Swedish rock singer Jonas Almquist makes a cameo as a Nazi officer.
