= David Hughes (novelist) =

British novelist (1930–2005)

David Hughes (27 July 1930 – 11 April 2005) was a British novelist. His best known works included The Pork Butcher (Constable, 1984) for which he was awarded the WH Smith Literary Award in 1985 and But for Bunter, published as The Joke of the Century in the United States.

== Biography ==
He was born in Alton, Hampshire to Edna Francis and Gwilym Fielden Hughes and educated at Eggar's Grammar School, King's College School, Wimbledon and Christ Church, Oxford, where he was editor of Isis.

On leaving university he worked for a time as a reader for the publisher Rupert Hart-Davis, and then went on to work at the London Magazine with his great friend Alan Ross.

He married the Swedish actress Mai Zetterling in 1958 and collaborated with her on a number of films and books. They divorced in 1976.

He remarried in 1980, and had two children.

His later books included a memoir of his friend Gerald Durrell, called Himself and Other Animals, published in 1997.

== Works ==
=== Novels ===
- "A Feeling in the Air" / US "Man Off Beat" (1957)
- "Sealed With a Loving Kiss" (1959)
- "The Horsehair Sofa" (1961)
- "The Major" (1964)
- "The Man Who Invented Tomorrow" (1968), about H. G. Wells
- "Memories of Dying" (1976)
- "A Genoese Fancy" (1979)
- "The Imperial German Dinner Service" (1983)
- "The Pork Butcher" (1984) – filmed as Souvenir (1989)
- "But for Bunter" / US "The Joke of the Century" (1986)
- "The Little Book" (1996)

=== Screenplays (with Mai Zetterling) ===
- Loving Couples (1964)
- Night Games (1966)
- Doctor Glas (1967)
- The Girls (1968)

=== Other ===
- "A Study of J.B. Priestley" (1958)
- "The Road to Stockholm" (1964) a travel book
- "The Seven Ages of England" (1967)
- "The Rosewater Revolution" (1971), a socio-cultural analysis
- "The Widow of Ephesus" (1971) libretto for the chamber opera by Michael Hurd
- "Himself and Other Animals" (1997), a memoir of his friend Gerald Durrell
- "The Lent Jewels" (2002), a biography of Archibald Campbell Tait, a 19th-century Archbishop of Canterbury
- "The Hack's Tale" (2004), a search for the origins of journalism
