= Loving Couples (1964 film) =

1964 film

- Swedish cover
- Directed by: Mai Zetterling
- Written by: David Hughes; Agnes von Krusenstjerna; Mai Zetterling
- Produced by: Göran Lindgren; Rune Waldekranz
- Starring: Harriet Andersson; Gunnel Lindblom; Gio Petré; Gunnar Björnstrand; Jan Malmsjö; Anita Björk; Eva Dahlbeck
- Cinematography: Sven Nykvist
- Edited by: Paul Davies
- Release date: 21 December 1964
- Running time: 118 minutes
- Country: Sweden
- Language: Swedish

Images
- Times Square marquee : "Moral Decay Erotically Revealed !"; Loving Couple with Gate of Flesh

Loving Couples (Swedish: Älskande par) is a 1964 Swedish drama film directed by Mai Zetterling. It was Zetterling's first feature film as director, and was entered into the 1965 Cannes Film Festival.

== Synopsis ==
The film opens after the outbreak of the First World War in 1914. In the beginning, we meet the three female protagonists at the same maternity hospital. They are all related to the Eka gård, owned by Petra von Pahlen. Angela, Petra's niece, is expecting a child with Thomas, the archaeologist; Adèle, the wife of the tenant at Eka gård, Tord Holmström. Eka is inhabited by Angela's aunt; Agda, a maid and is married to the painter Stellan von Pahlen through a marriage of convenience. The father of Agda's expected child is Bernhard Landborg, one of the heirs to the neighboring estate Ösa.

The plot is carried forward through flashbacks: Angela is depicted as a young girl at her father's funeral and then an 18-year-old at her birthday party at Eka. She has then been taken care of by her aunt Petra. Angela goes to school in a girls' boarding school, where she experiences the eroticism and desire. One of her schoolmates Stanny, Bernhard's sister, has taken a liking to her. Teacher Bell tries to seduce her. Later, it is depicted how Angela meets Thomas on a train by chance. Petra, who waits at the station for Angela, sees her former lover, who is now married and has a son.

Adèle's childhood goes from well-to-do conditions to poverty due to her father's death. She is forced to go out and sell candies, among other humiliating experiences. Adèle experiences a romantic love story with Daniel, but due to mésalliance becomes married to the tenant Tord. The hatred towards this marriage and towards the upper class poisons her life.

Agda is the most cheerful among the three even though she was born into a poor working class and her upbringing is not without any incidence: An older man tries to rape her during her childhood.

On Midsummer Eve 1914, the people of Eka go to the neighboring estate Ösa, which is owned by bank manager Landborg. Angela sees Thomas again, and they fall in love. Bernhard, who is an officer, has sex with Agda in the bushes. During the supper, those present ask Agda to sing. She performs a Salvation Army song but people then talk over her singing. Stellan von Pahlen plays erotic games with Mrs. Landborg. During the dinner, Adèle is drunk and expresses her hatred. Tord escorts her home.

The war breaks out. The men must go into military service and disappear from the women's everyday life. The new era is also coming to Eka. Electricity is installed. Stellan marries Agda after Bernhard offers 15,000 Kroner in annual annuity.

At the hospital, Angela's relative Dr. Jacob Lewin, a gynecologist, watches over these three women. Adèle's dead fetus is removed from her body. Agda gives birth to her child. The film ends in Angela's childbirth, and a real filmed childbirth is used.

== Cast ==
- Harriet Andersson as Agda Frideborg
- Gunnel Lindblom as Adèle Holmström - née Silfverstjerna
- Gio Petré as Angela von Pahlen
- Anita Björk as Petra von Pahlen
- Gunnar Björnstrand as Dr. Jacob Lewin
- Eva Dahlbeck as Mrs. Landborg
- Jan Malmsjö as Stellan von Pahlen
- Lissi Alandh as Bell
- Bengt Brunskog as Tord Holmström
- Anja Boman as Stanny, Bernhard's sister
- Åke Grönberg as The fat man
- Margit Carlqvist as Dora Macson
- Heinz Hopf as Lt. Bernhard Landborg
- Märta Dorff as Alexandra Vind-Frija
- Jan-Eric Lindquist as Peter von Pahlen
- Hans Strååt as Thomas Möller, scientist, father of Angela's child
