= Alf Kjellin =

Swedish actor

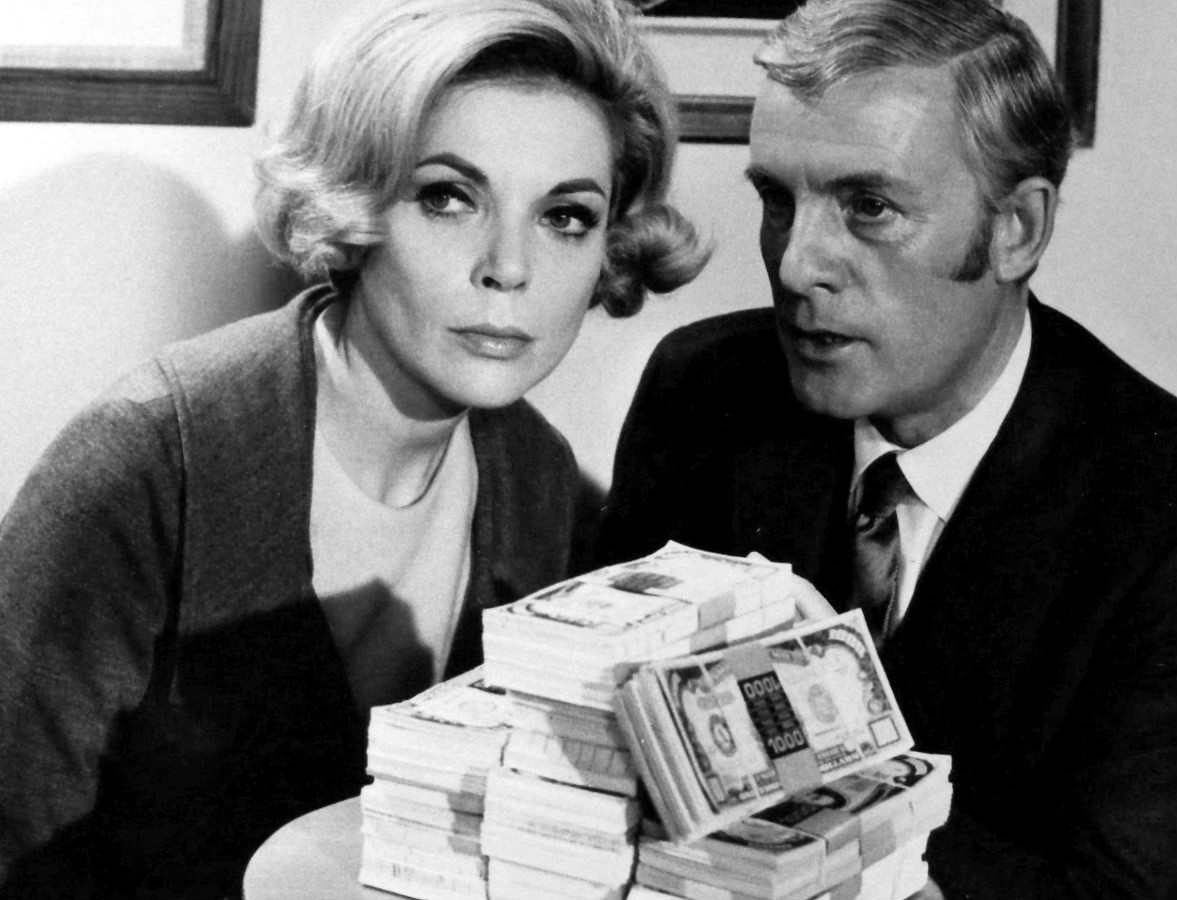
- Kjellin with Barbara Bain in an episode of Mission: Impossible, 1969
- Born: 28 February 1920; Lund, Sweden
- Died: 5 April 1988 (aged 68); Los Angeles, California, U.S.
- Other names: Christopher Kent; Christopher Kelleen
- Occupations: Actor; Director
- Years active: 1937–1985

Alf Kjellin (Swedish pronunciation: [ˈalf ɕɛ̌lˈɪːn]; 28 February 1920 – 5 April 1988) was a Swedish film actor and director, who also appeared on some television shows.

== Biography ==
Kjellin underwent two changes of names in his early days in Hollywood. The first studio for which he worked billed him as Christopher Kent, and the next studio changed his name to Christopher Kelleen. He made one film using each name. Producer Stanley Kramer wanted him to make another change for another film, but Kjellin insisted on using his real name from that point on.

Kjellin was well established as a film actor when he occasionally took on roles in television shows. In 1965 he prominently guest-starred as Stalag Luft Kommandant Colonel Max Richter in the two-part episode "P.O.W." (Episodes 30 and 31) of Twelve O'Clock High. He directed over 130 TV episodes for such shows as The Alfred Hitchcock Hour, Hawaii Five-O, The Man from U.N.C.L.E., The Waltons, Dynasty as well as the 1974 Columbo episodes Mind Over Mayhem and Negative Reaction and an episode of the 1976 series Sara.

Kjellin was born in Lund, Sweden and died in Los Angeles, California of a heart attack.

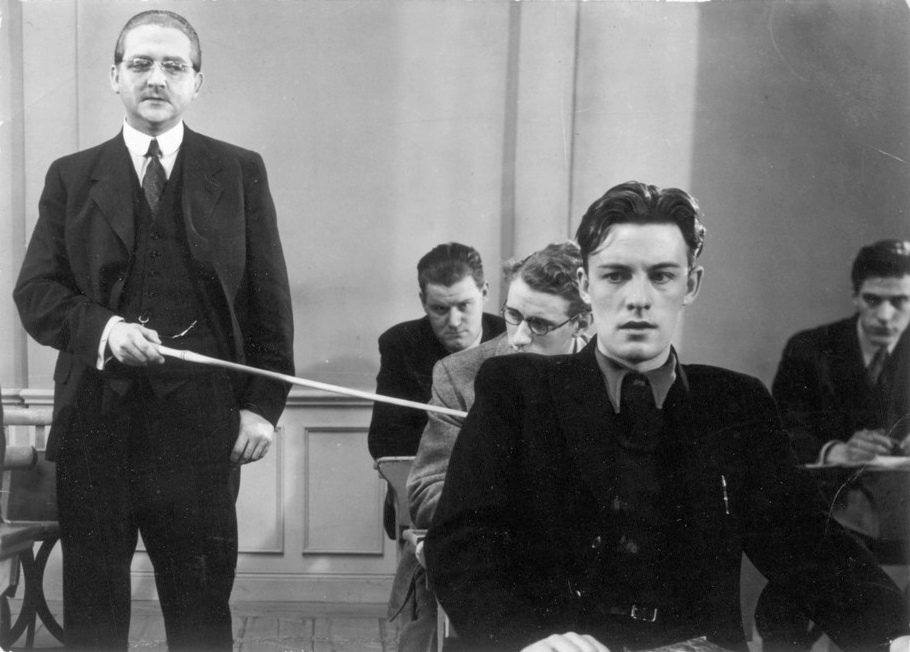
Stig Järrel and Alf Kjellin (right) in Torment (1944)

== Selected filmography ==
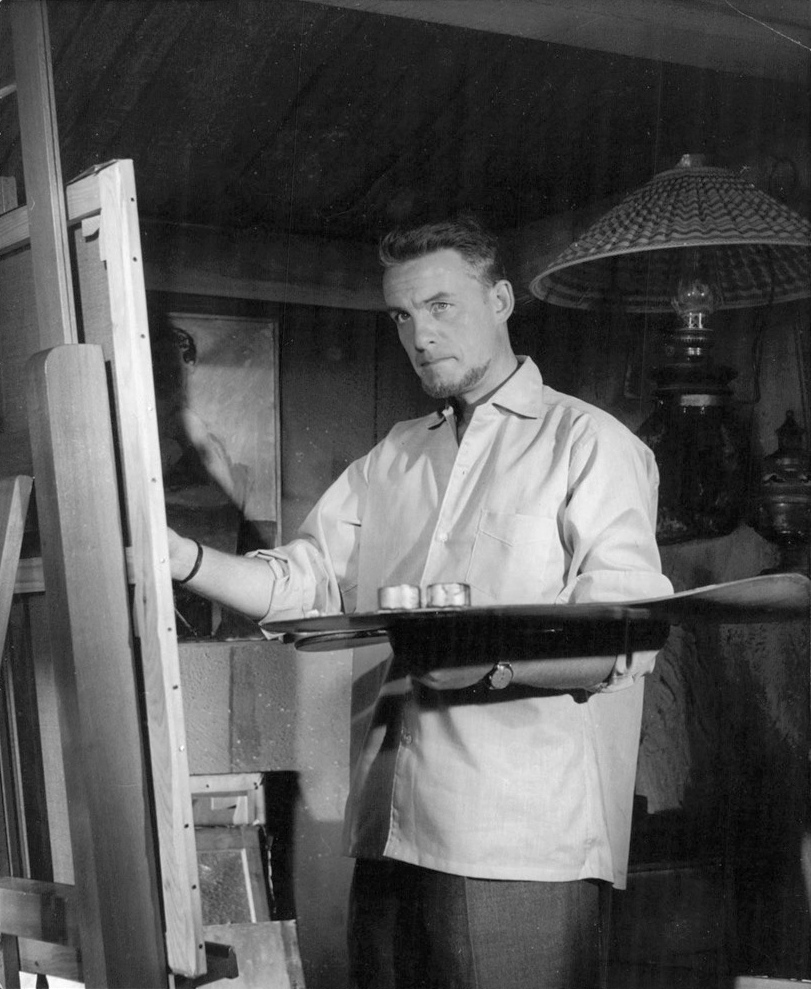
Kjellin in Summer Place Wanted (1957)

- John Ericsson, Victor of Hampton Roads (1937) – Young man on Delamater's office (uncredited)
- Med folket för fosterlandet (1938) – Young Man Who Receives Soccer Scores (uncredited)
- Gläd dig i din ungdom (1939) – Henning
- Kadettkamrater (1939) – Greggy Ståhlkrantz
- Stål (1940) – Erik, young worker
- Juninatten (1940) – Assistant Physician (uncredited)
- Hans nåds testamente (1940) – Jacob
- Bright Prospects (1941) – Åke Dahlberg
- The Fight Continues (1941) – Dr. Georg Hammar
- Night in Port (1943) – Arnold
- I Killed (1943) – Harris
- Gentleman with a Briefcase (1943) – Lennart Dalén
- Appassionata (1944) – Eric
- The Invisible Wall (1944) – Ivan Levy
- Torment (1944) – Jan-Erik Widgren
- Prince Gustaf (1944) – Prince Gustaf
- Vandring med månen (1945) – Dan Killander
- Affairs of a Model (1946) – Erik Lunde
- Iris and the Lieutenant (1946) – Robert Motander
- Sunshine Follows Rain (1946) – Jon
- The Girl from the Marsh Croft (1947) – Gudmund Erlandsson
- Woman Without a Face (1947) – Martin Grande
- Madame Bovary (1949) – Leon Dupuis
- Singoalla (1949) – Knight Erland Månesköld
- This Can't Happen Here (1950) – Björn Almkvist
- The White Cat (1950) – The Man Without Identity
- In the Arms of the Sea (1951) – Martin Winner
- Summer Interlude (1951) – David Nyström
- Divorced (1951) – Dr. Bertil Nordelius
- My Six Convicts (1952) – Clem Randall
- The Iron Mistress (1952) – Philippe de Cabanal
- The Juggler (1953) – Daniel
- No Man's Woman (1953) – Arne Persson
- The Chieftain of Göinge (1953) – Lieutenant Henrik Wrede
- Girl Without a Name (1954) – Erland Ljung
- The Girl in the Rain (1955) – Martin Andreasson
- Blockerat spår (1955) – Himself
- Egen ingång (1956) – Arvid Stenman
- The Stranger from the Sky (1956) – Stig Hallman
- My Passionate Longing (1956) – Mikael
- A Guest in His Own House (1957) – Age Dahl
- Summer Place Wanted (1957) – Arne Forsman, Artist
- The Mysterians (1957) – Yamamoto (voice)
- Playing on the Rainbow (1958) – Björn Rådström
- Only a Waiter (1959) (director only)
- Panic in Paradise (1960) – Frederik
- The Pleasure Garden (1961) (director only)
- Karneval (1961) – Ragnar Ennart
- Two Living, One Dead (1961) – Rogers
- The Alfred Hitchcock Hour (1962) — S01E02 as Edwin Volck
- The Victors (1963) – Priest
- Min kära är en ros (1963) – P.G. Nilsson
- Ship of Fools (1965) – Freytag
- Assault on a Queen (1966) – Eric Lauffnauer
- Ice Station Zebra (1968) – Col. Ostrovsky
- Mission: Impossible (1968) – Stefan Prohosh
- Mission: Impossible (1969) – Karl Vandaam
- Midas Run (1969) (director only)
- The McMasters (1970) (director only)
- Zandy's Bride (1974) – Avery (uncredited)
