= Amorosa (1986 film) =

1986 film by Mai Zetterling

- Directed by: Mai Zetterling
- Written by: Mai Zetterling
- Starring: Stina Ekblad; Erland Josephson
- Music by: Roger Wallis
- Distributed by: Sandrew
- Release date: 14 March 1986
- Running time: 117 minutes
- Country: Sweden
- Language: Swedish

Amorosa is a 1986 Swedish film starring Stina Ekblad and Erland Josephson and directed by Mai Zetterling. The story, an adaptation of the life of writer Agnes von Krusenstjerna (Ekblad), details her sexually charged and often turbulent relationship with David Sprengel (Josephson). At the 22nd Guldbagge Awards, Ekblad won the award for Best Actress and Josephson won the award for Best Actor.

== Cast ==
- Stina Ekblad as Agnes von Krusenstjerna
- Erland Josephson as David Sprengel
- Philip Zandén as Adolf von Krusenstjerna
- Lena T. Hansson as Ava
- Olof Thunberg as Ernst von Krusenstjerna
- Peter Schildt as Gerhard Odencrantz
- Rico Rönnbäck as Edward von Krusenstjerna
- Inga Landgré as sister Klara
- Inga Gill as Mrs. Tollen
- Anita Björk as Arvida Gottliebsen
- Lauritz Falk as Hugo Hamilton
- Gunnel Broström as Evelina Hamilton
- Johan Rabaeus as Jan Guy Hamilton
- Mimi Pollak as friherrinnan Rosenhjelm
- Börje Ahlstedt as Joachim Rosenhjelm
- Gösta Krantz as Felix Tollen
- Margreth Weivers as Beda Odencrantz
- Henrik Schildt as Frey Odencrantz
- Nils Eklund as Salomon Gottliebsen

== Production ==
The film was shot primarily in Sweden and Venice, Italy.
