= Solveig Ternström =

Swedish actress

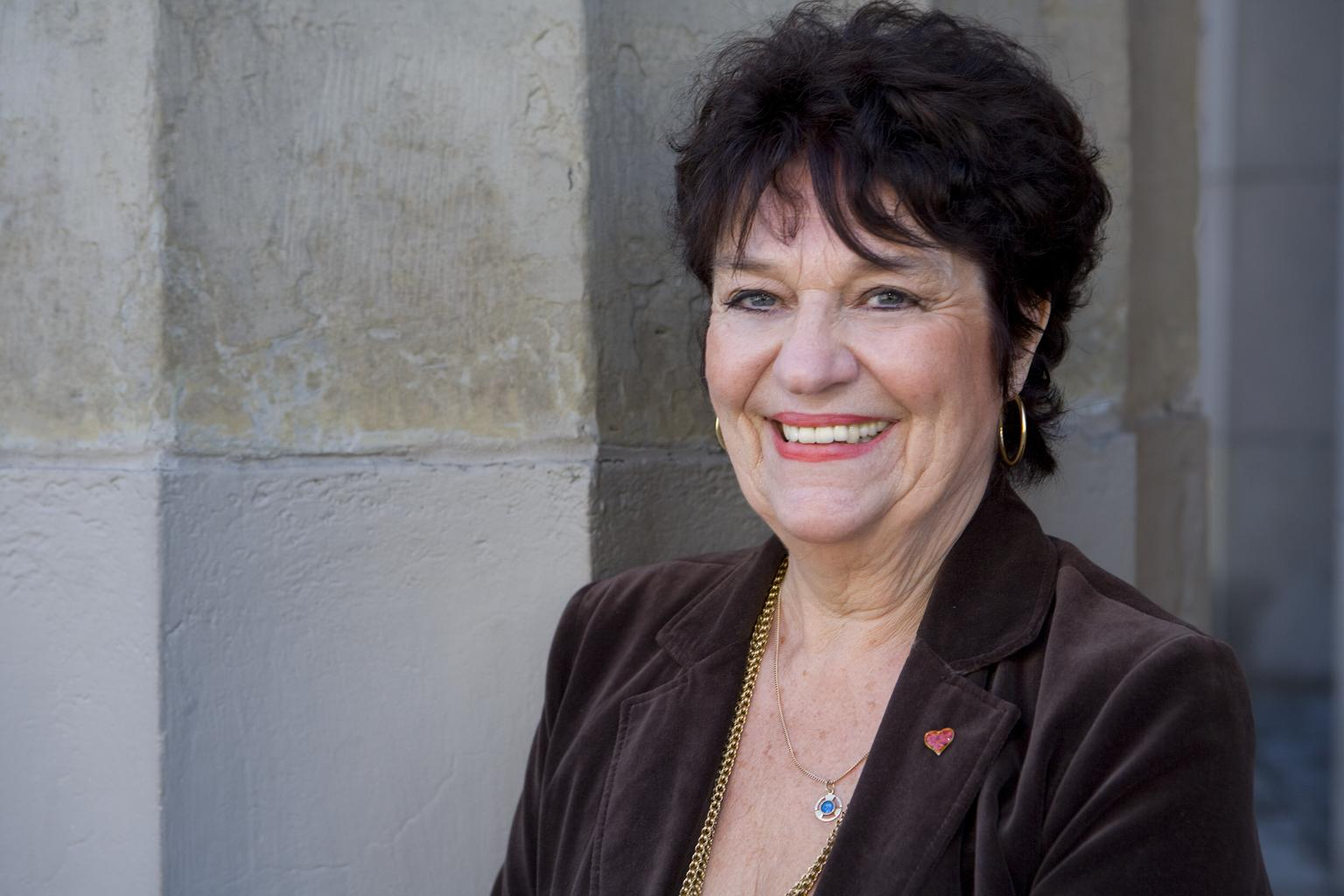
- Solveig Ternström in September 2008
- Born: 17 July 1937 (age 88); Stockholm, Sweden
- Occupations: actress, politician

Solveig Ternström (born 17 July 1937 in Stockholm) is a Swedish actress and former Centre Party politician. She was a member of the Riksdag between 2006 and 2010. She is very negative to nuclear power and left the centre party in July 2010 because she was disappointed to them regarding their updated politics about nuclear power.

== Selected filmography ==
- Rider in Blue (1959)
- The Shot (1969)
- Summer Paradise (1977)
- Morsarvet (1993)
- The Viking Sisters (2022)
