= Rune Ericson =

Swedish cinematographer

- Born: 29 May 1924; Stockholm, Sweden
- Died: 4 February 2015 (aged 90); Thailand
- Occupation: Cinematographer
- Years active: 1947-1991

Rune Ericson Swedish pronunciation: [ˈrʉ̂nɛ ˈêrikˌsɔn] (29 May 1924 – 4 February 2015) was a Swedish cinematographer. At the 20th Guldbagge Awards he won the Special Achievement award. He worked on more than 60 films and television shows between 1947 and 1991. In 1969, Ericsson invented the Super 16mm film format.

== Selected filmography ==
- Bill Bergson, Master Detective (1947)
- Robinson in Roslagen (1948)
- Stronger Than the Law (1951)
- Classmates (1952)
- All the World's Delights (1953)
- Unmarried Mothers (1953)
- A Night at Glimmingehus (1954)
- People of the Finnish Forests (1955)
- The Girl in the Rain (1955)
- Moon Over Hellesta (1956)
- Seventeen Years Old (1957)
- We at Väddö (1958)
- The Die Is Cast (1960)
- Hide and Seek (1963)
- Swedish Wedding Night (1964)
- Stimulantia (1967)
- Rooftree (1967)
- The Girls (1968)
- Doctor Glas (1968)
- Blushing Charlie (1970)
- Visions of Eight (1973)
- To Be a Millionaire (1980)
- Ronia, the Robber's Daughter (1984)
