= The Little Book (Hughes novel) =

1996 novel by David Hughes

First edition

The Little Book is the final novel published by English writer David Hughes. It was originally published by Hutchinson in 1996. Written in the first person, it deals with the management of the space between the diagnosis of a serious medical condition and the time left to the sufferer.
