= Gunnel Lindblom =

Swedish actress (1931–2021)

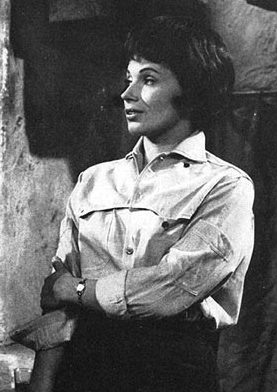
- Lindblom playing television theatre in 1963
- Born: Gunnel Märtha Ingegärd Lindblom; 18 December 1931; Gothenburg, Sweden
- Died: 24 January 2021 (aged 89); Brottby, Uppland, Sweden
- Occupations: Actress, film director
- Years active: 1952–2018
- Spouses: Sture Helander (m. 1960; div. 1970) Frederik Dessau (m. 1981; div. 1986)

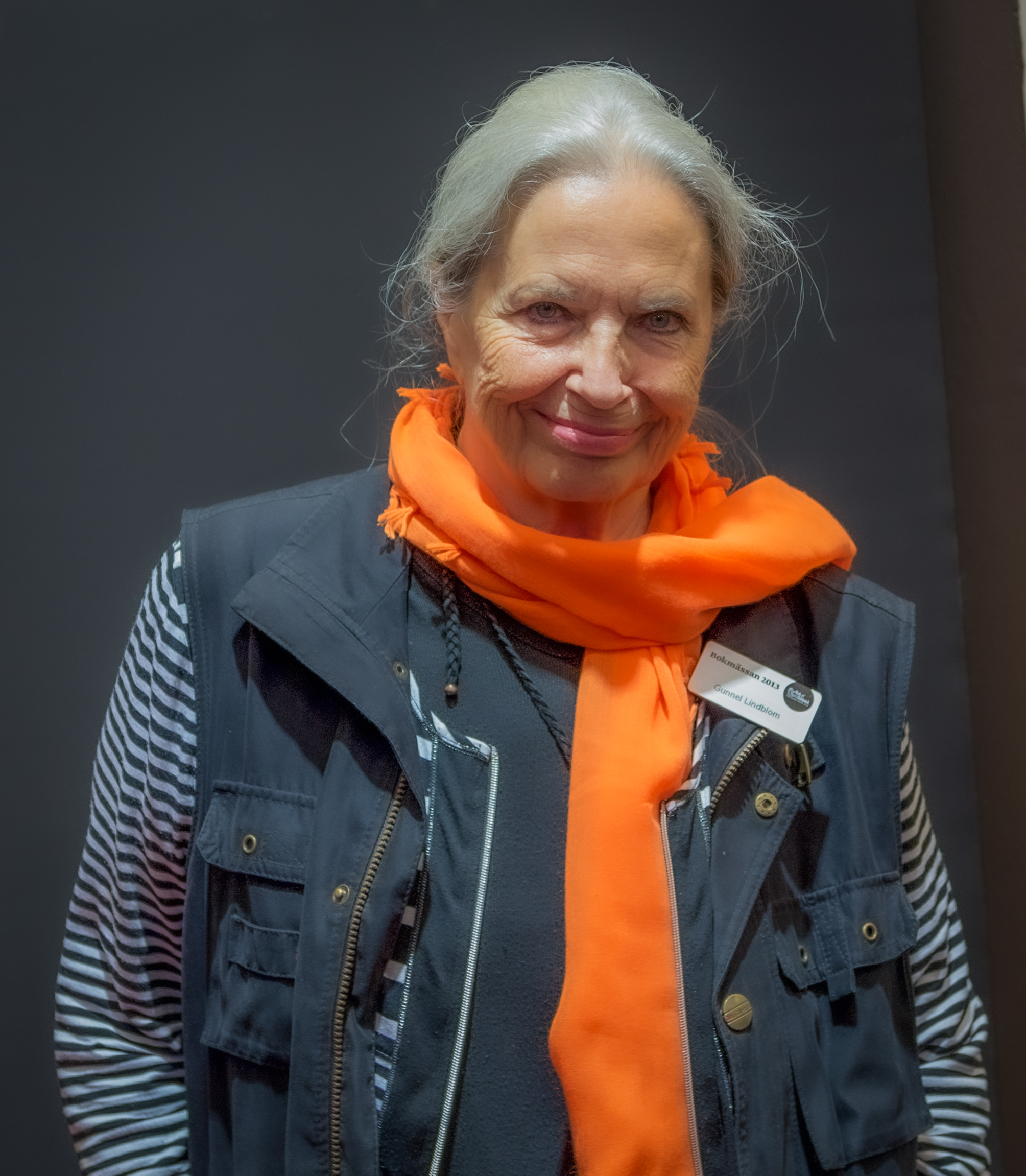
Gunnel Lindblom in 2013

Gunnel Märtha Ingegärd Lindblom (18 December 1931 – 24 January 2021) was a Swedish film actress and director.

== Career ==
As an actress, Lindblom was particularly associated with the work of Ingmar Bergman, though in 1965 she performed the lead role in Miss Julie for BBC Television. She also played the key role of The Mummy in Bergman's staging of Strindberg's The Ghost Sonata in 1998–2000, a performance that earned her much critical acclaim.

She appeared on stage as Tintomara's mother in Carl Almqvist's play Drottningens juvelsmycke (English: The Queen's Tiara), staged at the Royal Dramatic Theatre for the theatre's 100-year jubilee in 2008. In 2009, she directed the Jon Fosse play Flicka i gul regnjacka (Girl in Yellow Raincoat) at the Royal Dramatic Theatre, starring Stina Ekblad and Irene Lindh, which premiered on 9 October.

Lindblom married physician Sture Helander, whom she first met following her admission to hospital suffering from appendicitis during the shooting of The Virgin Spring. The couple had three children together, but divorced in 1970. Lindblom then married Frederik Dessau, a Danish director. Her second marriage was dissolved five years later. Lindblom died on 24 January 2021 after a bout of illness.

== Selected filmography ==
| Year | Title | Role | Director | Notes |
|---|---|---|---|---|
| 1952 | Love | Rebecka Andersson | Gustaf Molander | |
| 1955 | The Girl in the Rain | Ingrid | Alf Kjellin | |
| 1956 | The Song of the Scarlet Flower | Kerstin | Gustaf Molander | |
| 1957 | The Seventh Seal | Mute girl | Ingmar Bergman | |
| 1957 | Wild Strawberries | Charlotta Borg | Ingmar Bergman | |
| 1958 | The Venetian | Valeria | Ingmar Bergman | Television film |
| 1958 | Rabies | Jenny | Ingmar Bergman | Television film |
| 1960 | The Virgin Spring | Ingeri | Ingmar Bergman | |
| 1960 | Good Friends and Faithful Neighbours | Margit | Torgny Anderberg | |
| 1962 | Winter Light | Karin Persson | Ingmar Bergman | |
| 1963 | The Silence | Anna | Ingmar Bergman | |
| 1964 | Loving Couples | Adèle Holmström | Mai Zetterling | |
| 1966 | Hunger | Ylajali | Henning Carlsen | |
| 1966 | Woman of Darkness | Anna / Mother | Arne Mattsson | |
| 1967 | The Vicious Circle | Maria | Arne Mattsson | |
| 1968 | The Girls | Gunilla | Mai Zetterling | |
| 1973 | Scenes from a Marriage | Eva | Ingmar Bergman | Television miniseries |
| 1977 | Summer Paradise | – | Herself | Also writer and director |
| 1981 | Sally and Freedom | Nora | Herself | Also director, produced by Bergman |
| 2009 | The Girl with the Dragon Tattoo | Isabella Vanger | Niels Arden Oplev | |
| 2011 | Der Kommissar und das Meer | Gunnila Winarve | Anno Saul | Television series; 1 Episode |
