= Night Games (1966 film) =

1966 film

- Directed by: Mai Zetterling
- Written by: David Hughes; Mai Zetterling
- Produced by: Göran Lindgren
- Cinematography: Rune Ericson
- Edited by: Paul Davies
- Music by: Jan Johansson; Georg Riedel
- Production company: Sandrews
- Distributed by: Sandrew; Rank; Gala Film Distributors; Mondial Films; Gefion Film; Metro-Goldwyn-Mayer; Filmipaja; City Film Sandrew Metronome Distribution; Stiftelsen Svenska Filminstitutet; Stockholm
- Release date: 1966
- Running time: 105 minutes
- Country: Sweden
- Languages: English; Swedish

Night Games (Swedish: Nattlek) is a 1966 Swedish movie directed by Mai Zetterling and starring Ingrid Thulin. The film premiered at the 27th Venice International Film Festival where it was considered so controversial that it was shown to the jury in private. The film was also the cause of former child-star Shirley Temple's resignation from the San Francisco International Film Festival. Temple denounced the film as “pornography for profit” and was against its being shown at the festival.

== Plot ==
Jan returns with his fiancée to his childhood home. While there he flashes back to his childhood, twenty years before when he lived an unfettered life watched over by a strange great-aunt and a hedonistic and often neglectful mother and father.

In particular he remembers watching his mother give birth to a stillborn child after refusing to go to the hospital in the middle of a party and his sexual obsession with his mother which included being caught by her while he was masturbating while listening to her read a bedtime story.

In the present, his relationship with his fiancée grows more strained as his past begins to affect the way he acts in the present.

== Cast ==
- Ingrid Thulin as Irene, the mother
- Keve Hjelm as Jan, as an adult
- Jörgen Lindström as Jan, age 12
- Lena Brundin as Mariana
- Naima Wifstrand as Astrid
- Monica Zetterlund as Lotten
- Lauritz Falk as Bruno
- Rune Lindström as Albin
- Christian Bratt as Erland
- Lissi Alandh as Melissa
