= Agnes von Krusenstjerna =

Swedish writer

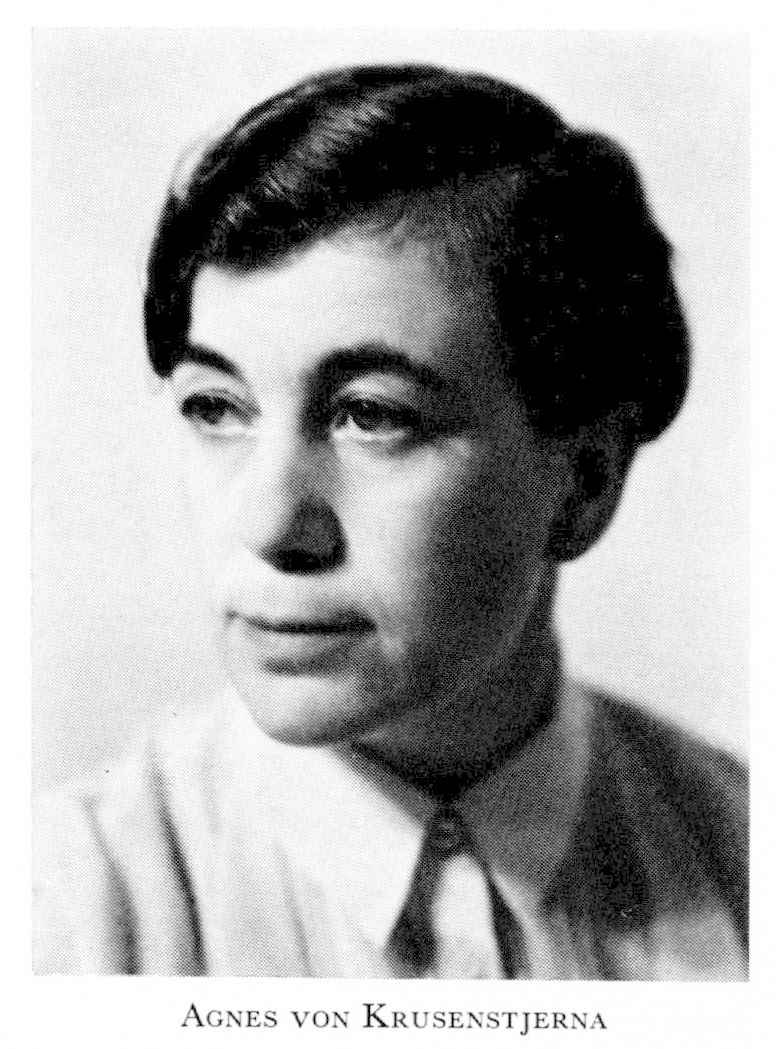
- Agnes von Krusenstjerna
- Born: October 9, 1894; Växjö, Sweden
- Died: March 10, 1940 (aged 45); Stockholm, Sweden
- Writing career
- Notable work: Tony series

Agnes von Krusenstjerna (October 9, 1894 – March 10, 1940) was a Swedish writer and noble. She was a controversial writer whose books challenged the moral standards of the day and was the center of a great literary controversy of the freedom of speech.

== Biography ==
Krusenstjerna was born in Växjö and brought up in Gävle. Niece of Edvard von Krusenstjerna, she was born in to the nobility. She was educated at the teacher's academy of Anna Sandström in Stockholm. She married David Sprengel in 1921.

Agnes von Krusenstjerna was on several occasions admitted to mental hospitals. In 1940, she was diagnosed with a brain tumour; she died on the operating table in March 1940. Krusenstjerna died in Stockholm.

=== Works ===
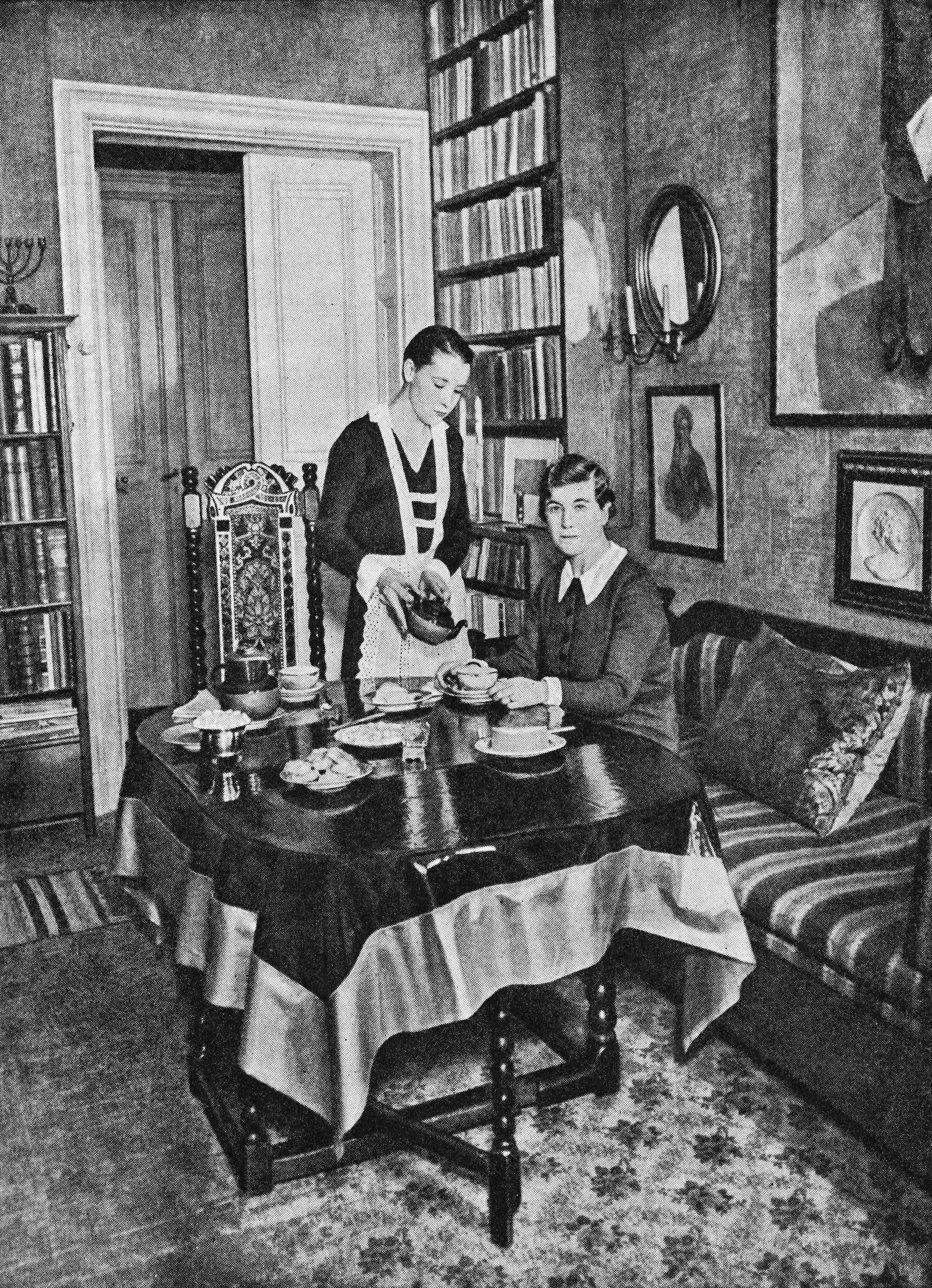
Agnes von Krusenstjerna

She debuted as a writer with the girls' novel Ninas dagbok (1917) and made her breakthrough with the Tony novel series (1922–26) about a girl's development in a noble environment.

The Tony series was greatly controversial, as it depicted sexual themes as well as mental disorders, which made Krusenstjerna controversial. Sexuality was, before the 1920s, not mentioned in novels, and her books depicted sex and intercourse. The novel series Fröknarna von Pahlen created one of the greatest debates and controversies of its time in Sweden, known as Krusenstjernafejden (The Krusenstjerna feud): the series described sexual intercourse, which caused an enormous amount of attention and led to a two-year-long (1933–35) debate about the freedom of speech, the relation of literature toward the moral standards, the right of female expression and the right to sexual freedom, which ended with the writers' conference of Sigtuna 1935. She was supported by Eyvind Johnson, Johannes Edfelt, Elmer Diktonius and Karin Boye, who compared the affair to the censorship of Nazi Germany.

Her writing was closely inspired to her own life and can be regarded as partially autobiographical, especially her last, unfinished series, Fattigadel (Poor Nobility) (1935–1938).

== Works ==
Novels

- Ninas dagbok (Nina's diary) 1917
- Helenas första kärlek (The first love of Helena) 1918
- Fru Esters pensionat (Mrs Ester's boarding house) 1927
- Händelser på vägen (Events on the way) 1929

Series

The Tony series:

1. Tony växer upp (Tony's adolescence) 1922
2. Tonys läroår (Tony's years of learning) 1924
3. Tonys sista läroår (Tony's last years of learning) 1926

The Miss von Pahlen's series: Fröknarna von Pahlen:

1. Den blå rullgardinen (The blue curtain) 1930
2. Kvinnogatan (The Women's street) 1930
3. Höstens skuggor (The shadows of the autumn) 1931
4. Porten vid Johannes (The gate at Johannes) 1933
5. Älskande par (Loving couples) 1933
6. Bröllop på Ekered (Wedding at Ekered) 1935
7. Av samma blod (By the same blood) 1935

Fattigadel (Poor nobility) original title: Viveca von Lagercronas historia (The story of Viveca von Lagercrona):

1. Fattigadel (Pauper nobility) 1935
2. Dunklet mellan träden (The shadow between the trees) 1936
3. Dessa lyckliga år (These happy years) 1937
4. I livets vår (In the spring of life) 1938

Poems

- Nunnornas hus (The house of nuns) 1937

Short stories

- En dagdriverskas anteckningar (The notes of an idle woman) (1923)
- Delat rum på Kammakaregatan (A shared room at Kammakaregatan) (1933)
- En ung dam far till Djurgårdsbrunn (A young lady visits Djurgårdsbrunn) (1933)
- Vivi, flicka med melodi ( Vivi, a girl with a melody) (1936)
- Stulet nyår (A stolen New Year's Eve)

== Fiction ==
Her life was portrayed in Amorosa (1986 film).

== See also ==
- Alfhild Agrell
- Frida Stéenhoff
