= Fyrtiotalism =

Swedish literary movement

Fyrtiotalism ("Forties-ism", referring to the 1940s) is the name of a literary movement in Swedish literature. The writers were not a united group, but represented a new generation of literature with a modernist tendency. Their work, influenced by writers such as Fyodor Dostoyevsky, Franz Kafka, T. S. Eliot and the events during World War II, marked the breakthrough and establishment of Modernist Swedish literature.

Leading representatives of the movement were Erik Lindegren and Karl Vennberg. Other prominent representatives were Stig Dagerman, the poet Werner Aspenström, novelist Lars Ahlin and critic Lennart Göthberg. The magazine 40-tal (1944-1947) was a central forum for the authors to publish their ideas in articles, essays and literary contributions.

== The literature ==
The literature of fyrtiotalism was often experimental and focused on the universal existential questions. A central work is Erik Lindegren's surreal "shattered sonnets" in mannen utan väg (The Man Without a Way, 1942) that expresses the despair and disillusionment of the time. Karl Vennberg's more low-key poetry is marked by skepticism and irony in works such as Halmfackla (Straw Torch, 1944). Werner Aspenström appeared as another prominent poet with his Skriket och tystnaden (The Scream and the Silence, 1946).

Stig Dagerman and Lars Ahlin were the leading prose writers. With novels such as Ormen (The Snake, 1945) and De dömdas ö (Island of the Doomed, 1946) Dagerman became one of the best known representatives of fyrtiotalism. The short story was prominent with writers such as Dagerman, Thorsten Jonsson, Sivar Arnér and Olov Jonason.

== The debates ==
Fyrtiolism was also noted for its many polemic debates between the modernists and their detractors. The form and language of modernist works such as Lindegren's mannen utan väg was attacked as "incomprehensible" by older critics, which resulted in a heated debate. The debate was further fuelled when Camera obscura (1946) by Jan Wictor (a pseudonym for Lars Gyllensten and a friend), a work that many critics took seriously, turned out to be a parody of modernist poetry. Another debate was about the pessimism in fyrtiotalism literature.
