= Anna Takanen =

Swedish-Finnish actor, director and writer (born 1968)

- Born: 1968 (age 57–58); Kungsbacka
- Alma mater: Malmö Theatre Academy
- Occupations: actor, director, writer

Anna Takanen (born 1968) is a Swedish-Finnish actor, director and writer who has been the artistic director of Gothenburg City Theatre and the director of The House of Culture (Stockholm).

== Early life and education ==
Anna Takanen's father was one of the Finnish war children evacuated to Sweden at the start of the Second World War; he was aged four. He was from Mänttä, Finland, and grew up in Halland County, Sweden.

Anna was born in Kungsbacka, Halland County, and grew up in Tågarp, Falkenberg. She was bullied at school for her Finnish heritage. She attended Malmö Theatre Academy, graduating in 1994.

== Career ==
Takanen acted with the Stockholm company Unga Klara between 1995 and 2005. She was mentored by Suzanne Osten. In 2018, she played Barbro Alving in a play about Alving, Bang.

Takanen became director of The House of Culture (Stockholm) in 2015, and remained in the post until 2019. She had been manager at Gothenburg City Theatre for nine years, from 2006 to 2015. On taking up the post at Gothenburg at the age of 36, she was the youngest theatre director in Sweden. Both her contracts as theatre director have included a requirement for her to act or direct once a year.

Plays that she has directed include:

- Medeas barn (Medea's children), by Per Lysander and Suzanne Osten, Unga Klara, 2003
- Fosterlandet, by Lucas Svensson, at Gothenburg City Theatre, 2015
- German Autumn, by Stig Dagerman, at Uppsala City Theatre, 2023
- The Night is the Mother of the Day, by Lars Norén, at Malmö City Theatre, 2026

She has aimed for gender equality and diversity in her work in the theatre, with a focus on women directors and playwrights, and leading roles for women actors. As director, she has put on premières of 150 plays, and two-thirds of those have been by new writers. She has been described as having "väldokumenterad kompetens att peta i svensk-finska familjesår" ("well-documented competence in probing Swedish-Finnish family wounds"). When she resigned as director of Stockholm in 2019, her work was described as "konstnärligt modig, kritisk och fullkomligt oförutsägbar" ("artistically brave, critical and completely unpredictable"). Svenska Dagbladet wrote that "mister svensk teater en engagerad och klok chef men den återfår en erfaren och stark skådespelare" ("Swedish theatre loses a committed and wise director, but it regains an experienced and strong actor").

== Writing ==
Takanen has written about her father's experience as an evacuee in her book Sörjen som blev (2019, Albert Bonniers Förlag). She adapted the memoir for the stage and performed it with the National Swedish Touring Theatre in 2021, directed by Mikaela Hasán. The book was translated into Finnish as Sina olet suruni (2020).

== Awards ==
Takanen was named Swedish Finn of the Year in 2019 by the Finnish Institute in Stockholm. In 2021, she was awarded the Order of the Lion of Finland for encouraging links between Sweden and Finland.

== Personal life ==
Takanen is married to a writer, Stig Hansén, and lives in Södermalm, Stockholm.
