= Petra Brylander =

Swedish actress and theatre chief (born 1970)

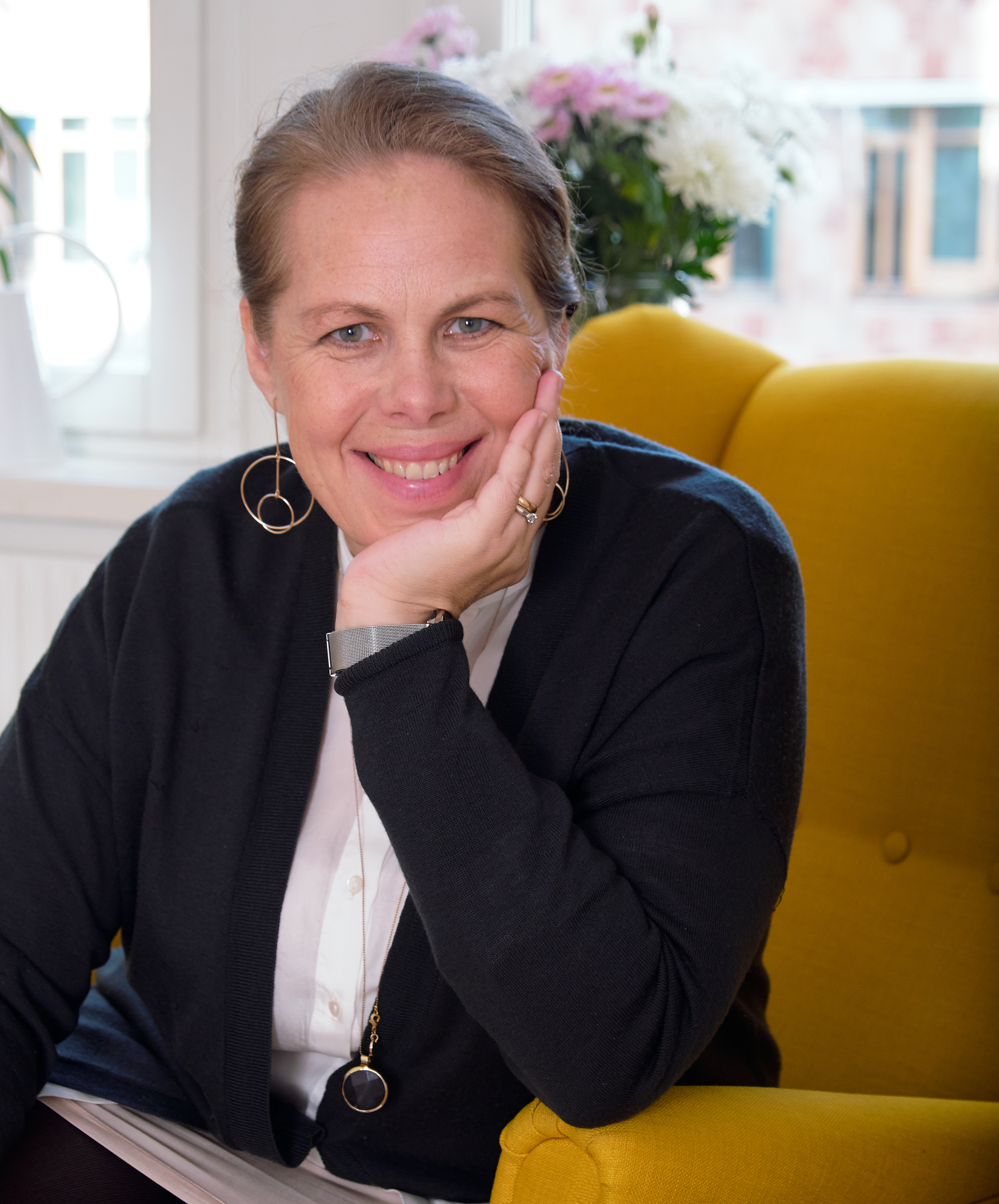
- Brylander in October 2016
- Born: 8 November 1970 (age 54); Kalix, Sweden
- Occupations: Actress; theatre chief
- Spouse: Dennis Sandin
- Children: 2

Petra Brylander (born 8 November 1970) is a Swedish actor and theatre chief.

She was born on 8 November 1970 in Kalix.

Brylander started as background actress at Norrbottensteatern, and 1992–1995 she studied at Malmö Theatre Academy and after that she has been engaged at among Helsingborg City Theatre, and at Malmö City Theatre since 2001 (where she is theatre chief since 1 July 2007). In 2007 she performed the monologue Livet kom så plötsligt which is about a woman with Asperger syndrome.

On 1 August 2016, Brylander took over as manager and CEO of the Uppsala City Theatre. She held the position until 2024, when she was succeeded by Rikard Lekander.

She is married to director Dennis Sandin. They have two children.

== Selected filmography ==
- 1996 – Jägarna
- 2001 – Fru Marianne (TV)
- 2001 – Vilospår (TV)
- 2005 – Doxa
- 2006 – Wallander – Den svaga punkten
- 2006 – Emblas hemlighet (TV)
