= Uppsala City Theatre =

City theatre in Uppsala, Sweden

- Uppsala stadsteater
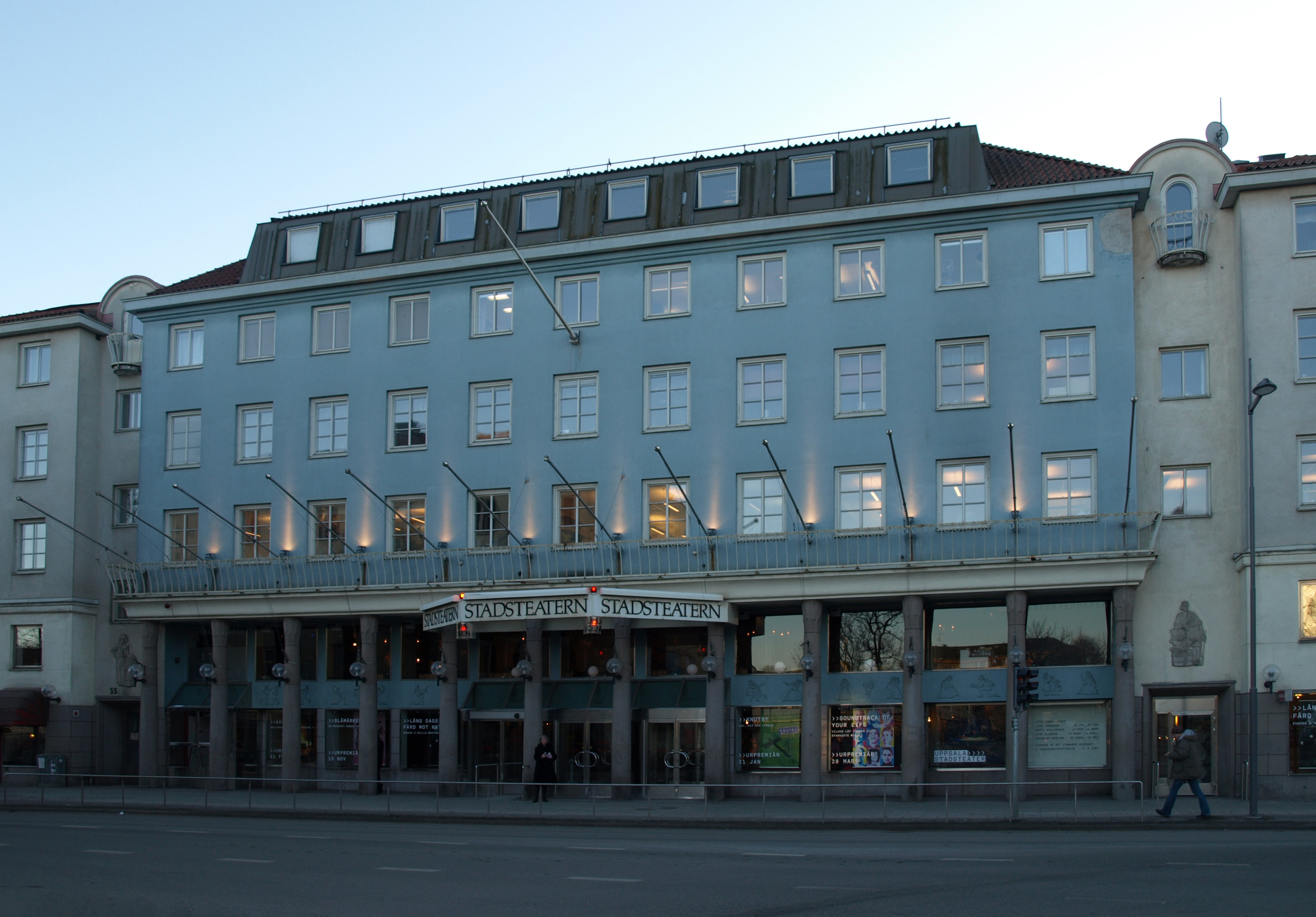
- The theatre exterior in 2009
- Interactive map of Uppsala City Theatre
- Address: Kungsgatan 53; Uppsala; Sweden
- Coordinates: 59.858817°N 17.642736°E
- Public transit: Uppsala Central Station

Construction
- Opened: 23 September 1950
- Architect: Gunnar Leche

Website
- uppsalastadsteater.se

The Uppsala City Theatre (Swedish: Uppsala stadsteater) is a theatre in Uppsala, Sweden. It is located in close proximity to Uppsala Central Station.

== History ==
In December 1930, it was reported that city architect of Uppsala, Gunnar Leche, was drawing up sketches for a new theatre. The plans went unrealized until April 1942, when the city council agreed to a building proposal based on Leche's sketches. Its neoclassical style was considered controversial at the time.

The theatre was inaugurated on 23 September 1950, with a production of Marriage of Figaro performed by actors from the Royal Swedish Opera. Despite this, the theatre celebrated its 50th anniversary in 2001 (reflecting a 1951 opening) and reports its first production to be Peter Ustinov's The Four Loves of a Warrior (Swedish: Fyra krigares kärlek), which premiered on 28 September 1951. The theatre had its ten-thousandth visitor after about two weeks of that production's run. The first manager of Uppsala City Theatre was Gösta Folke. His wife Agneta Prytz was also a member of the first permanent ensemble. In fact, 18 of 22 actors at the theatre were married to each other, which Folke believed would support the group's respectability. One of the early major plays they staged was August Strindberg's A Dream Play, which received negative reviews from critics.

Folke was succeeded by Carl-Axel Heiknert in 1957. Then from 1964 to 1974, Palle Granditsky was manager. He had previously worked at the theatre under Folke and Heiknert, as a director, actor, program editor, and union chairman.

Linus Tunström led the theatre from 2007 to 2016. During his tenure, the number of annual productions doubled and ticket revenue increased by 40%. He was also credited with bringing more national attention to the theatre. One controversy during Tunström's leadership was Andriy Zholdak's guest directing of Mephisto, which premiered 15 October 2011 and provoked "outrage from the Swedish critical establishment."

On 1 August 2016, Petra Brylander took over as manager and CEO. She held the position until 2024, when she was replaced by Rikard Lekander.

== Notable productions ==
- German Autumn, by Stig Dagerman, directed by Anna Takanen, 2023

== Stages ==
The theatre has four stages:

- Main Stage (approx. 530 seats)
- Small Stage (approx. 160 seats)
- Basement Stage (approx. 100 seats)
- Intiman (approx. 50 seats)
