= Daddy, Darling =

1970 film

- Directed by: Joseph W. Sarno
- Starring: Helli Louise; Gio Petré
- Release date: November 1970
- Running time: 88 minutes
- Countries: Denmark; United States
- Language: English

Daddy, Darling is a 1970 Danish / American sexploitation film directed by Joseph W. Sarno.

== Plot ==
Nineteen year old Katja lives with her father Eric. She has fallen in love with her father, and she is shocked when he announces that he wants to marry his girlfriend Svea. After a brief affair with Lars, she is introduced to a circle of lesbian women.

== Cast ==
- Helli Louise as Katja
- Gio Petré as Svea Karlson
- Ole Wisborg as Eric Holmquist
- Lise Henningsen as Lena Belli
- Søren Strømberg as Lars
- Lise Thomsen as Eva
- Tove Maës as Segrid Sten
