= Hans-Christian Thulin =

Swedish actor (born 1977)

Hans Christian Thulin (born 11 November 1977 in Malmö) is a Swedish actor. He studied at Malmö Theatre Academy and at Fridhems folkhögskola. He hosted the 2005 "Sommarlovsmorgon" Sommarlov 05 together with Björn Johansson Boklund and Ayla Kabaca.

== Selected filmography ==
- 2003 – The Man Who Smiled
- 2006 – Emblas hemlighet (TV)
- 2009 – Flickan som lekte med elden
