= Karl Vennberg =

Swedish poet, writer and translator

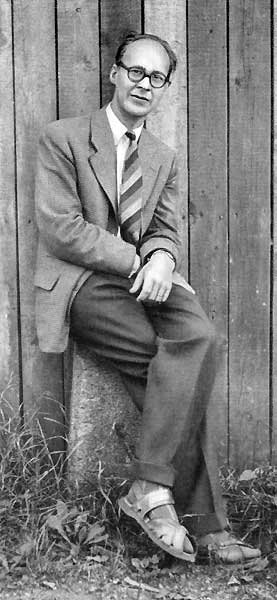
- Karl Vennberg
- Born: Karl Gunnar Vennberg; 11 April 1910; Blädinge, Sweden
- Died: 12 May 1995 (aged 85); Spånga, Sweden
- Spouses: Anna-Lisa Lindegren (1938); Ingegärd Martinell (1965)
- Children: Inger; Hanna
- Writing career
- Period: 1937–1990

Karl Vennberg (11 April 1910 – 12 May 1995) was a Swedish poet, writer and translator. Born in Blädinge parish, Alvesta Municipality, Kronoberg County as the son of a farmer, Vennberg studied at Lund University and in Stockholm and worked as a teacher of Norwegian in a Stockholm folk high school. His first collection of poems "Hymn och hunger" ("Hymn and Hunger") was published in 1937. Along with Erik Lindegren he became the most prominent representative of the Swedish literary movement fyrtiotalism in the 1940s. The collection of poems Halmfackla (1944, "Straw Torch") was his literary breakthrough. During his career, he published 20 collections of poetry. His literary criticism, mainly as cultural editor in Aftonbladet from 1957 to 1975, had an important influence on the Swedish literary scene. Vennberg became known for translating and introducing the literary works by Franz Kafka to Swedish, including The Trial (1945). He also translated works by T.S. Eliot and Thomas Mann's Death in Venice to Swedish. In the 1970s he also became known as one of the translators of the Bible.

Generally considered a leading Swedish Modernist poet, several dissertations have been written about Vennberg's works. His poems are analytical but also often make use of irony. Vennberg is often said to be influenced by T. S. Eliot. He was awarded several literary prizes, including Samfundet De Nios pris (1957), Bellmanpriset (1960) and the Nordic Council Literature Prize (1972). He was a member of Samfundet De Nio from 1962 and became an honorary doctor at Stockholm University in 1980.

== Political views ==
It has been argued by some, such as poet Lars Gustafsson and politician Per Ahlmark, that Vennberg expressed support for fascism and nazism. However, these accusations were later revealed to be based largely on quotes taken out of context, and the truth is that Vennberg actually held strong anti-fascist views; for example, in his diary in 1935, he described Nazism as "nothing but private capitalism's last resort". Per Meurling, a close friend of Vennberg's, quoted him as saying: "One can understand, or try to understand, all that lives and the way it constantly changes. But how can one grasp the infinite roughness and wickedness of Hitler? For me, Nazism is, and has always been, the most repulsive thing I have seen in my life." Vennberg was also a member of the Swedish Clarté League, a socialist students' organization which resolutely opposed fascism and Nazism in the 1930s and 1940s.

During the early Cold War, Vennberg was an adherent of the so-called "third stance" (Swedish: tredje ståndpunkten) in Swedish public debate, which advocated a neutral stance in the conflict between the two superpowers. Despite this, he participated in a gathering at the USSR embassy in Stockholm where he praised the "cultural upbuilding" in the USSR. In 1948, he participated in the World Congress of Intellectuals for Peace in Wrocław, Poland, where he was elected to the International Committee of Intellectuals in Defence of Peace.

== Awards and honors ==
Karl Vennberg won a number of literary prizes during his career:

- Samfundet De Nios pris, 1956
- The Bellman Prize, 1960
- Litteraturfrämjandets stora pris, 1963
- The Nordic Council's Literature Prize, 1972
- The Carl Emil Englund Prize, 1979
- The Kellgren Prize, 1979
- The Aniara Prize, 1988
- The Pilot Prize, 1993
- The Gerard Bonnier Prize, 1994

He was also awarded an honorary doctorate at Stockholm University.
