= National Swedish School of Acting =

The National Swedish School of Acting (Swedish: Statens scenskola) may refer to:

- National Swedish School of Acting, Gothenburg
- National Swedish School of Acting, Malmö
- National Swedish School of Acting, Stockholm
