= Wedding Worries (novel) =

1949 novel by Stig Dagerman

- 1970 edition
- Author: Stig Dagerman
- Original title: Bröllopsbesvär
- Translator: Paul Norlen; Lo Dagerman
- Language: Swedish
- Publisher: Norstedts förlag
- Publication date: 1949
- Publication place: Sweden
- English publication date: 2018
- Pages: 296

Wedding Worries (Swedish: Bröllopsbesvär) is a 1949 novel by the Swedish writer Stig Dagerman. It was Dagerman's final novel.

== Plot ==
The story is set in a remote Swedish village during the final preparations for a wedding between a young woman and an older butcher. Several locals are portrayed over a span of 24 hours.

== Reception ==
When Wedding Worries was published in English in 2018, Kirkus Reviews described it as "an awkward marriage between Bosch's Hell and Bruegel's Wedding Feast", portraying "a great deal of ribaldry" with humour "of the desperate, gasping variety".

== Adaptation ==
The novel is the basis for the 1964 film Swedish Wedding Night starring Jarl Kulle and Christina Schollin.
