= Ormen (film) =

1966 film

- Directed by: Hans Abramson
- Written by: Hans Abramson; Nita Värhammar
- Based on: The Snake by Stig Dagerman
- Produced by: Lorens Marmstedt
- Starring: Christina Schollin
- Cinematography: Mac Ahlberg
- Release date: 25 April 1966
- Running time: 97 minutes
- Country: Sweden
- Language: Swedish

Ormen, also known as The Serpent, is a 1966 Swedish drama film directed by Hans Abramson. It is based on the novel The Snake by Stig Dagerman. Christina Schollin won the award for Best Actress at the 3rd Guldbagge Awards.

== Cast ==
- Harriet Andersson as Wera
- Morgan Andersson as Åke
- Eddie Axberg as Delivery boy
- Hans Bendrik as Sgt. Svensson
- Gudrun Brost as Maria Sandström
- Lars Edström as Pjatten
- Hans Ernback as Bill Stenberg
- Björn Gustafson as Mattsson
- Jens Christian Heusinger as Soldier
- Tor Isedal as Sgt. Bohman
- Pierre Lindstedt as Soldier
- Tommy Nilsson as Berndt Claesson
- Lars Passgård as Gideon
- Christina Schollin as Iréne Sandström
- Margareta Sjödin as Inga
- Signe Stade as Ing-Lis
- Lennart Sundberg as Train conductor
- Brita Öberg as Agda Morin
