= Abigail Leslie Is Back In Town =

- Theatrical release poster
- Directed by: Joseph W. Sarno
- Written by: Joseph W. Sarno
- Starring: Mary Mendum; Jennifer Jordan; Eric Edwards; Jamie Gillis
- Cinematography: Bil Godsey
- Edited by: Joseph W. Sarno
- Music by: Jack Justis
- Production company: High Ground Productions
- Distributed by: Monarch Releasing Corporation
- Release date: September 1974
- Country: United States
- Language: English

Abigail Leslie Is Back In Town (also known as The Sexpert) is a 1974 American sexploitation film written and directed by Joseph W. Sarno and starring Mary Mendum and Jennifer Jordan.

The film was theatrically released in September 1975. It was broadcast on US TV in 1983.

== Plot ==
A seductive woman who left her small fishing town long ago after being caught with another woman's husband, returns to shake up the place by seducing everyone, including the woman and her girlfriends.

== Cast ==
- Mary Mendum as Priscilla
- Jennifer Jordan as Abigail
- Eric Edwards as Chester
- Jamie Gillis as Gordon
- Kathie Fitch as Alice Anne
- Jennifer Welles as Drucilla
- Julia Sorel as Lila
- Susan Sloan as Tracey
- Alex Mann as Tyler
- Sonny Landham as Bo

== Reception ==
The Monthly Film Bulletin wrote: "Full marks to Joe Sarno for at least trying. Where most sexploiter direction is as limp as the organs displayed, Sarno extracts genuine performances from his cast, manages to make one listen to the dialogue with rather more than passing interest, and stages his scenes with very creditable dramatic flair. ... Given the need to provide a full quota of sex, the plot gets sillier and sillier as it grows increasingly schematic; and despite the pleasing ambivalence carefully built up around the character of Misty ... the film ultimately treats her as little more than the routine sexual catalyst shaking up provincial repressions."
