= Kärleksön =

1977 film

- Directed by: Hammond Thomas
- Screenplay by: Hammond Thomas
- Cinematography: Eric Gustafsson
- Release date: 28 November 1977 (Sweden)
- Running time: 91 minutes
- Country: Sweden
- Language: Swedish
- Budget: SEK 913,048

Kärleksön ("Love Island") is a Swedish pornographic film from 1977, directed by Joseph W. Sarno (using the pseudonym Hammond Thomas).

The film premiered on November 28, 1977.

== Plot ==
Katrin is a teenager living on an island in the Stockholm Archipelago. She often spies on the other inhabitants and organizes love encounters in which she actively participates.

== Cast ==
- Leena Hiltunen – Katrin Norrman
- Sonja – Astrid Palmqvist
- Liza
- Thomas – Erik Palmqvist
- Göte – Axel Blomberg
