= Swedish Wedding Night =

1964 film

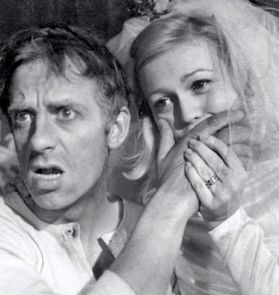
- Still with Jarl Kulle and Christina Schollin
- Directed by: Åke Falck
- Written by: Stig Dagerman; Lars Widding
- Based on: Wedding Worries by Stig Dagerman
- Starring: Jarl Kulle
- Cinematography: Rune Ericson
- Release date: 24 August 1964
- Running time: 95 minutes
- Country: Sweden
- Language: Swedish

Swedish Wedding Night (Swedish: Bröllopsbesvär) is a 1964 Swedish drama film directed by Åke Falck. The film is based on the novel Wedding Worries by Stig Dagerman. It won the Guldbagge Award for Best Film and Jarl Kulle won the award for Best Actor at the 2nd Guldbagge Awards.

== Cast ==
- Jarl Kulle as Hilmer Westlund
- Christina Schollin as Hildur Palm
- Edvin Adolphson as Victor Palm
- Isa Quensel as Hilma Palm
- Lars Ekborg as Simon Simonsson
- Lena Hansson as Siri Westlund
- Catrin Westerlund as Irma Palm
- Margaretha Krook as Mary
- Tor Isedal as Rudolf Palm
- Lars Passgård as Martin
