= Fanny Hill (1968 film) =

- American poster
- Directed by: Mac Ahlberg
- Written by: Mac Ahlberg
- Based on: Fanny Hill; 1749 novel by John Cleland
- Produced by: Tore Sjöberg
- Starring: Diana Kjær; Hans Ernback; Keve Hjelm; Oscar Ljung
- Cinematography: Jan Lindeström
- Edited by: Ingemar Ejve
- Music by: Georg Riedel
- Production companies: Minerva Film Producktion; Europafilm
- Release date: 1968
- Running time: 101 mins
- Country: Sweden
- Language: Swedish
- Box office: $4 million (US/Canada rentals

Fanny Hill is a 1968 Swedish film written and directed by Mac Ahlberg and starring Diana Kjær based on the 1748 erotic novel Memoirs of a Woman of Pleasure by John Cleland.

== Plot summary ==
Fanny Hill, a young woman from the countryside, moves to the city to work and becomes a prostitute. A wealthy man, Jan Wilhelmsson, takes a liking to her, and when he dies of a heart attack, she inherits his fortune. After celebrating Midsummer in the archipelago, Fanny reunites with Roger, a former lover. They resolve past misunderstandings and become a couple. Fanny's inheritance proves useful, as Roger has lost all his money through speculation.

== Cast ==
- Diana Kjær as Fanny Hill
- Hans Ernback as Roger Boman
- Keve Hjelm as Leif Henning
- Oscar Ljung as Otto Wilhelmson
- Tina Hedström as Monika
- Gio Petré as Fru Schöön
- Mona Seilitz as Charlotte

== Alternate version ==
The film was released in a 91 minute version by Cinemation Industries in the United States in September 1969. The film was rescored by Clay Pitts Productions and only 8 minutes of the original score by Georg Riedel was featured.

== Reception ==
It was successful in the United States and Canada, earning theatrical rentals of $4 million. It was number one at the box office in the United States for a week in its seventh week of release.
