= The Die Is Cast (film) =

1960 film

- Directed by: Rolf Husberg
- Written by: Vic Sunesson; Kerstin Ekman
- Produced by: Sven Lindberg
- Starring: Åke Falck; Anita Björk; Sven Lindberg
- Cinematography: Rune Ericson
- Edited by: Lennart Wallén
- Music by: Torbjörn Lundquist; Hilding Rosenberg
- Production company: Sandrews
- Distributed by: Sandrew
- Release date: 15 February 1960
- Running time: 94 minutes
- Country: Sweden
- Language: Swedish

The Die Is Cast (Swedish: Tärningen är kastad) is a 1960 Swedish mystery thriller film directed by Rolf Husberg and starring Åke Falck, Anita Björk and Sven Lindberg. It was shot at the Centrumateljéerna Studios in Stockholm. The film's sets were designed by the art director Jan Boleslaw.

== Synopsis ==
When a member of a highly successful crime drama TV series is found murdered in a TV studio, the screenwriter of the TV series becomes the prime suspect. He tries to clear his name.

== Cast ==
- Åke Falck as Jerk Domare
- Anita Björk as Rebecca Striid
- Sven Lindberg as Holger Palm
- Gio Petré as Monica Sundberg
- Gunnar Sjöberg as Leonard Brett
- Sif Ruud as Elly Larsson
- Sigge Fürst as Simon Odd
- Toivo Pawlo as Hilding Björk
- Allan Edwall as Dag Serén
- Olof Thunberg as Didrik Cornelius
- Jan Malmsjö as Leif Hagman
- Marie Ahlstedt as Dancer
- Sten Ardenstam as Wardrober
- Sten Lonnert as Ballet Master
- Tilly Stephan as Waitress

== Bibliography ==
- Qvist, Per Olov & von Bagh, Peter. Guide to the Cinema of Sweden and Finland. Greenwood Publishing Group, 2000.
