= The Princess (1966 film) =

1966 Swedish film by Åke Falck

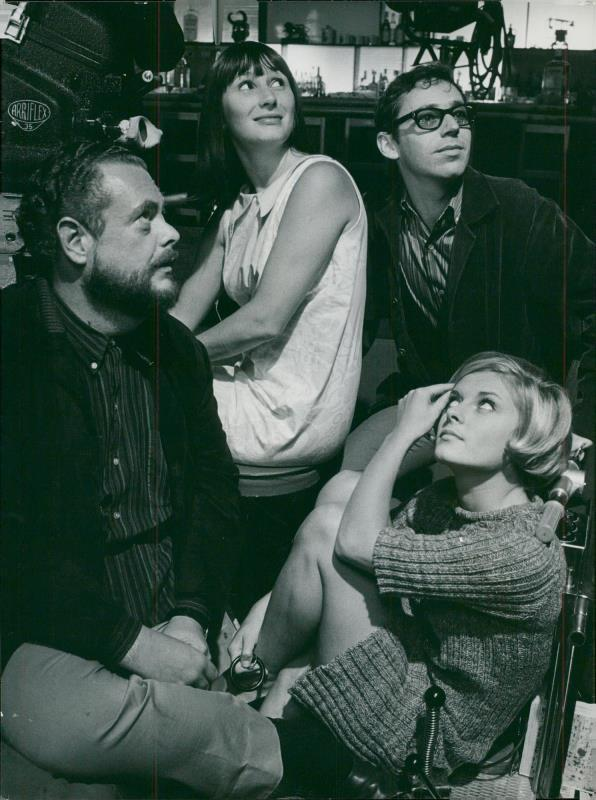
- Director Åke Falck with Grynet Molvig, Monica Nielsen, and Heinz Spira
- Directed by: Åke Falck
- Written by: Gunnar Mattsson; Lars Widding; Åke Falck
- Starring: Grynet Molvig
- Release date: 26 December 1966
- Running time: 103 minutes
- Country: Sweden
- Language: Swedish

The Princess (Swedish: Prinsessan) is a 1966 Swedish drama film directed by Åke Falck. It was entered into the 5th Moscow International Film Festival where Grynet Molvig won the award for Best Actress.

== Cast ==
- Grynet Molvig as Seija (as Ann-Kristin Molvig)
- Lars Passgård as Gunnar
- Monica Nielsen as Pirjo
- Birgitta Valberg as Doctor
- Tore Bengtsson as Doctor
- Thore Segelström as Doctor
- Tore Lindwall as Obstetrician
- Axel Düberg as Vicar
