= Nude in Charcoal =

1961 film

Nude in Charcoal is a 1961 feature film written and co-directed by Joseph W. Sarno.

It was the first feature film written and co-directed by one of America's most prolific sexploitation directors, who was the subject of the internationally distributed documentary The Sarnos: A Life in Dirty Movies.
