= Isidor Torkar =

Swedish actor (born 1960)

Isidor Torkar (born 1960) is a Swedish actor. He started his career in 1975 when he started as amateur actor at Skånska teatern in Landskrona where he was engaged until 1982 when he became a professional actor.

He was born in 1960 in Slovenia, and immigrated to Sweden with his family at the age of two.

== Filmography ==
=== Film ===
- Bornholms stemme (1999)
- Vuxna människor (1999)
- Den 5:e kvinnan (2002)
- Frostbiten (2006)

=== Television ===
- Macklean (1993)
- Faceless Killers (1994)
- Döda danskar räknas inte (1994)
- Sveriges Television's Christmas calendar (1996-2000)
- Fru Marianne (2001)
- Dolly & Dolly (1998)
- Wallander (2005-2006)
- Emblas hemlighet (2006)
