= Bornholms stemme =

- Directed by: Lotte Svendsen
- Written by: Elith Nulle Nykjær; Lotte Svendsen
- Starring: Sofie Stougaard; Henrik Lykkegaard
- Release dates: 3 September 1999 (Denmark); 14 July 2000 (Sweden)
- Running time: 114 minutes (Denmark)
- Countries: Denmark, Sweden, Norway
- Language: Danish

Bornholms stemme (English: Bornholms voice) is a 1999 Danish comedy film directed by Lotte Svendsen, starring Sofie Stougaard and Henrik Lykkegaard. The film takes place in a small fishing island off the coast of Sweden during a no-fishing period imposed in 1982, because of overfishing. The main characters are the stubborn fisher Lars Erik (Lykkegaard) and his wife Sonja (Stougaard).

== Cast ==
- Sofie Stougaard – Sonja
- Henrik Lykkegaard – Lars Erik
- Michelle Bjørn-Andersen - Karen
- Isidor Torkar – Francisco
- Thomas Bo Larsen – Ib
- Helle Dolleris - Bibi
- Søren Hauch-Fausbøll - Flemse
