= Marie Liljedahl =

Swedish actress (born 1950)

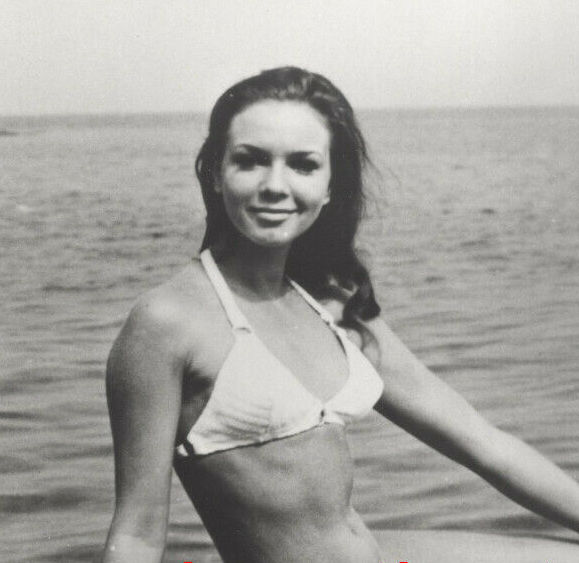
- Liljedahl in 1970
- Born: 15 February 1950 (age 75); Stockholm, Sweden
- Occupation: Actress
- Years active: 1968–1971

Marie Liljedahl (born 15 February 1950) is a Swedish actress who had a short-lived film career in the late-1960s and early-1970s, in the films of Joseph W. Sarno and Jesus Franco.

== Biography ==
Born in Stockholm, Sweden, Liljedahl became a stage actress at the age of ten, and a member of the Royal Swedish Opera ballet at the age of twelve. She was discovered dancing with a Stockholm ballet company by director Joseph W. Sarno. At seventeen, she began her film career with the lead role in Sarno's Inga (1968), which transformed her into an international sex symbol. Her other film roles included Eugenie in Eugenie… The Story of Her Journey into Perversion (1970) and Sibyl Vane in Dorian Gray (1970). In 1971, she appeared in the sequel to Inga (The Seduction of Inga), her last major role. She grew weary of the film industry and retired from acting at the age of twenty-one.

Liljedahl appeared in two Playboy magazine pictorials: "The Girls of Scandinavia" (June 1968) and "Flicker Flicka" (March 1969). Decades later, she said in DVD interviews that she regretted having made the sex films when she was young.

== Filmography ==
- O Zestos minas Augoustos (1966)
- Inga (1968)
- Three-Cornered Bed (1969)
- The New Adventures of Snow White (1969)
- Eva – den utstötta (1969)
- Eugenie… The Story of Her Journey into Perversion (1970)
- Dorian Gray (1970)
- Ann and Eve (1970)
- The Seduction of Inga (1971)
