= The Female Response =

- Theatrical release poster
- Directed by: Tim Kincaid
- Written by: Tim Kincaid; David Newburge
- Produced by: Richard Lipton
- Starring: Raina Barrett; Jacque Lynn Cotton; Michaela Hope; Jennifer Welles; Gena Wheeler; Roz Kelly
- Cinematography: Arthur D. Marks
- Edited by: Graham Place
- Music by: Bill Reynolds
- Production company: Trans American Films
- Release date: January 1973
- Running time: 89 minutes
- Country: United States
- Language: English

The Female Response (known in the UK as Everybody's At It) is a 1973 American sexploitation film directed by Tim Kincaid.

== Plot ==
Feminist newspaper columnist Marjorie is fired by her boss for refusing to curb the libertarian content of her writing. Instead, she gathers with six other women to discuss their sexual history as material for future writing to get the real female response. Her subjects are high-class prostitute Victoria, hippie Sandy, frustrated housewife Leona, overweight secretary Rosalie, dental nurse Gilda and socialite Andrea. They discuss their various sexual thoughts and agree to meet again in a month. When they reconvene Andrea's habit of leading men on and shunning them has resulted in her being raped by a mechanic, though she confesses she enjoyed it; Leona has attempted to rekindle her physical relationship with her husband with disappointing results; Victoria has begun a serious love affair with one of her clients; Sandy enjoys a liaison with a motorist while hitchhiking; Gilda has given in to her fascination with classified adverts in Screw but ends up in a bizarre BDSM session and Rosalie loses her virginity at a swinger's party.

Their sessions are intercut with vox-pop interviews on the street, where Marjorie questions passers-by.

== Cast ==
- Raina Barrett as Leona
- Jacque Lynn Colton as Rosalie
- Michaela Hope as Sandy
- Jennifer Welles as Andrea
- Gena Wheeler as Victoria
- Marjorie Hirsch as Marjorie
- Roz Kelly as Gilda
- Lawrason Driscoll as Karl
- Edmund Donnelly as Mark
- Todd Everett as Gary
- Richard Wilkins as Tom
- Phyllis MacBride as Rachel
- Suzy Mann as Ramona
- Curtis Carlson as Alex
- Herb Streicher as Max
- Anthony Scott Craig as Caller
- Richard Lipton as Leland

== Production ==
Filming was completed in New York City in October 1972.

== Release ==
The film premiered in Los Angeles on October 17, 1973.

== Response ==
Rob Craig described the individual tales of the characters as "vacillating from mind-numbingly boring to downright surreal" and their journey to sexual fulfilment as "pat and incredible" but noted the "cutting edge" editing techniques used by director Kincaid.
