= Roz Kelly =

American actress (born 1943)

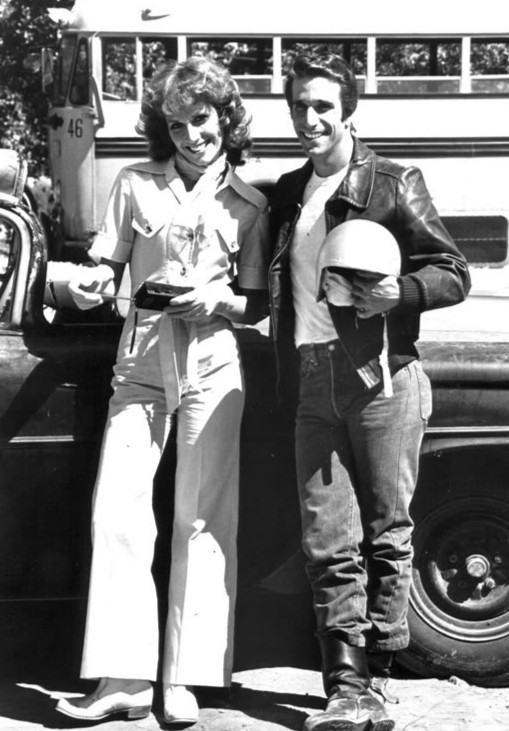
- Kelly as Pinky Tuscadero with Henry Winkler as Fonzie, 1976
- Born: Rosiland Schwartz; July 29, 1943 (age 83); Mount Vernon, New York, U.S.
- Occupation: Actress
- Years active: 1968–1983

Roz Kelly (born Rosiland Schwartz on July 29, 1943) is an American actress. She played Arthur "Fonzie" Fonzarelli's girlfriend Carol "Pinky" Tuscadero on the television series Happy Days.

== Career ==
Before Happy Days, Roz Kelly worked as a staff photographer for New York Magazine, where she took pictures of both unknowns and celebrities, including Jimi Hendrix, Soupy Sales, Andy Warhol, Cream, Leonard Cohen, Neil Diamond, and photographer Diane Arbus.

On Happy Days, Kelly played Carol "Pinky" Tuscadero, the older sister of Leather Tuscadero (played by singer Suzi Quatro). Carol insisted on being called "Pinky," and usually dressed in attire to match. Pinky was slated to be Fonzie's long-term girlfriend after her initial appearances in episodes 64–66; commercials for the next season even began promoting the character. When discord occurred among Kelly, the cast, and producers, her character was dropped; she was only mentioned briefly in two later episodes.

Beyond Happy Days, Kelly reprised her Pinky role on the first episode of the short-lived 1977 Happy Days spin-off, Blansky's Beauties. She had a small but memorable role in the television thriller Curse of the Black Widow (1977), and portrayed Diane Sullivan in the slasher film New Year's Evil (1980). Kelly also appeared in guest roles on Starsky & Hutch, The Paul Lynde Halloween Special, Baretta, Kojak, The Love Boat (S2 E10 1978), The Dukes of Hazzard, Charlie's Angels, and Fantasy Island. Her role in Starsky & Hutch was created when star Paul Michael Glaser (Starsky) planned to quit at the start of the third season, with Kelly's character, Officer Linda Baylor, intended to fill his place. However, Glaser was persuaded to stay, and Kelly's character appeared in three episodes, "Fatal Charm," “Las Vegas Strangler,” and “Death Notice.” Her role as Pinky Tuscadero was heavily promoted by ABC when the 1976 fall season began. She was billed as Roz "Pinky Tuscadero" Kelly for her appearance on The Paul Lynde Halloween Special in late October and appeared on Match Game PM the following week and later on Hollywood Squares.

Kelly also played roles in films such as Greetings (1968), The Owl and the Pussycat (1970), You've Got to Walk It Like You Talk It or You'll Lose That Beat (1971) and Full Moon High (1981), and had a voice role in the 1981 animated musical American Pop.

== Personal life ==
On November 29, 1998, she was arrested for firing a 12-gauge shotgun into the living room window of a neighbor's house after a car alarm had awoken her, and she also shot the neighbor's car and another nearby car. The neighbor was not home at the time. Pleading no contest, she received three years of felony probation on October 20, 2000. She was also ordered to receive psychiatric counseling and pay restitution.

On October 27, 2000, she was sentenced to 120 days in jail after pleading no contest to charges stemming from an August 20, 2000 arrest for hitting a man with her cane. She was given credit for the 98 days that she had already spent in jail awaiting sentencing, thus avoiding having to spend any more time in prison.

== Filmography ==
Year	Title	Role	Notes
1968	Greetings	Photographer (Vietnam Film)	
1969	Utterly Without Redeeming Social Value	Title Girl	
1970	The Owl and the Pussycat	Eleanor	
1971	You've Got to Walk It Like You Talk It or You'll Lose That Beat	Girl in Park	
1971	Okay Bill	Roz	
1973	The Female Response	Gilda	
1974	There Is No 13	Astrabeth Birdie	
1975-1977	Starsky and Hutch	Iris Thayer/Officer Linda Baylor/Francine	4 episodes
1976	Happy Days	Pinky Tuscadero	3 episodes
1976-1978	Kojak	Susan/Millie	2 episodes
1977	Blansky's Beauties	Pinky Tuscadero	
1977	Curse of the Black Widow	Flaps	
1978	Baretta	Alice	
1978	Sword of Justice	Melissa David	
1978-1979	The Love Boat	Lola LaShane/Reverend Whitney's girlfriend	3 episodes
1979	Amateur Night at the Dixie Bar and Grill	Doreen Reese	Television movie
1979	The Dukes of Hazzard	Amy Creavy	
1979-1980	Charlie's Angels	Gert Thomas/Jade Allen	2 episodes
1980	Murder Can Hurt You!	Virginia Trickwood	
1980	New Year's Evil	Diane Sullivan	
1980-1982	Fantasy Island	Olivia/Denise	2 episodes
1981	American Pop	Eva Tanguay	
1981	Nero Wolfe	Corey Baylor	
1981	Full Moon High	Jane	
1983	Trapper John, M.D.	Mary	
