= Åke Falck =

Swedish film director (1925–1974)

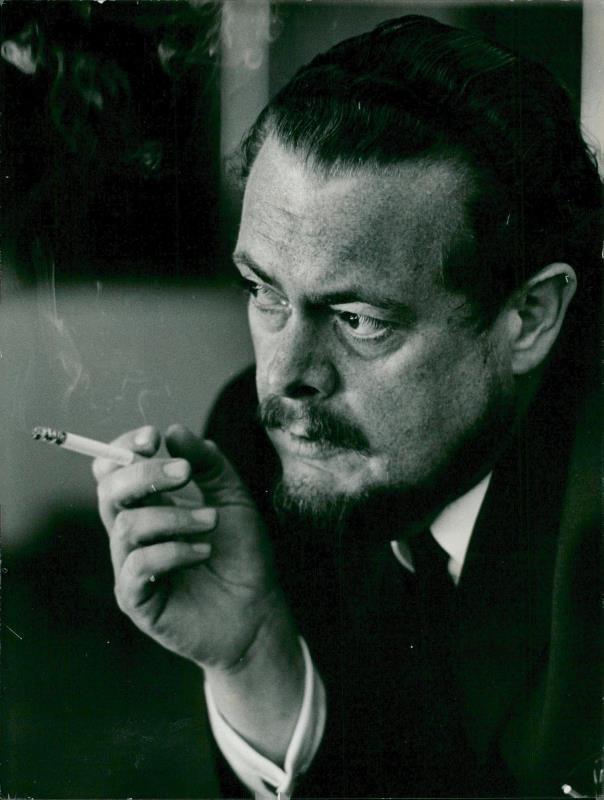
- Born: 3 April 1925; Gothenburg, Sweden
- Died: 12 October 1974 (aged 49); Danderyd, Sweden
- Occupation: Film director
- Years active: 1958-1972

Åke Falck (3 April 1925 – 12 October 1974) was a Swedish film director. He directed 13 films between 1958 and 1972. His 1966 film The Princess was entered into the 5th Moscow International Film Festival.

He married in 1949 the singer Brita Nordström (1925–2005) with whom he had a son Peter Emanuel Falck in 1952. In 1960 he remarried to the TV producer Karin Sohlman and had a daughter Carolina Falck in 1961.

Åke Falck was buried on 12 November 1974 at Djursholm's cemetery in the municipality of Danderyd. Åke Falcks Gata in the Torp district of Gothenburg was named after him in 2011.

== Filmography ==
Year	Title	Role	Notes
1950	Girl with Hyacinths	Man at Körner's Art Studio	Uncredited
1952	The Firebird	Spinky	
1960	The Die Is Cast	Jerk Domare	
1964	Swedish Wedding Night		Director
1966	The Princess		Director
1968	Farbror Blås nya båt		
1968	Vindingevals		Director
