= The Devil's Plaything =

1973 film

- Directed by: Joseph W. Sarno
- Written by: Joseph W. Sarno
- Produced by: Chris D. Nebe
- Starring: Nadia Henkowa; Anke Syring; Ulrike Butz; Nico Wolferstetter
- Cinematography: Steve Silverman
- Edited by: Karl Fugunt; Dietmar Preuss
- Music by: Rolf-Hans Müller
- Production companies: Monarex; Saga Film
- Distributed by: Saga Film (Sweden); Scotia International Filmverleih (West Germany); Ambassador Film Distributors (Canada); Omni Pictures (United States)
- Release date: 16 October 1973
- Running time: 85 minutes
- Countries: Sweden; Switzerland; West Germany
- Language: English

The Devil's Plaything (German: Der Fluch der schwarzen Schwestern) is a 1973 horror film directed by Joseph W. Sarno. The film is international co-production of Sweden, Switzerland and West Germany. Its uncut version features more suggestively sexual scenes.

== Plot ==
In a central European castle, two young girls are summoned to learn about a will making them heirs to the property, on condition that they stay there for a full year. They are received by the hostess, an austere-looking woman named Wanda, who organizes satanic lesbian rites at night that celebrate, in sex and sapphism, the vampire Varga. Coincidentally, on the same day an anthropologist studying local superstitions and her brother were victims of a road accident and asked for accommodation at the castle.

Wanda turns out to be the descendant of a vampire baroness, Varga, burned alive centuries ago by the villagers for vampirism. Through the lesbian priestess Wanda, Varga seeks revenge by eliminating the families of her torturers.

== Cast ==
- Nadia Henkowa as Wanda
- Anke Syring as Julia Malenkow
- Marie Forså as Helga
- Nico Wolferstetter as Peter Malenkow
- Ulrike Butz as Monika
- Flavia Keyt as Iris

== Critical response ==
Nick Schager of Slant Magazine gave the film one and a half out of four stars, writing, "The Devil’s Plaything exhibits a disinterest in horror and an inability to muster eroticism..." Ed Hulse of the trade journal Video Business describes the film as "a key title in the history of erotic horror", and writes, "The attractive young leads aren't the surgically enhanced bottle-blondes we typically see these days in Hollywood-made offerings of this type, and their acting is more than equal to the limited demands the script makes of them."
