= Gio Petré =

Swedish actress

- Born: Ann-Marie Birgitta Bengtsdotter Petré; 1 November 1937 (age 88); Stockholm, Sweden
- Other names: Gio Petré Thunholm; Gio Marmstedt
- Occupation: Actress
- Years active: 1955–1974
- Spouses: Lorens Marmstedt (m. 1962; died 1966) Lars-Erik Thunholm (m. 2000; died 2006)
- Partner: Alf Enerström (-1998)
- Children: 2 (with Marmstedt); 4 (with Enerström)

Gio Birgitta Petré, née Ann-Marie Birgitta Bengtsdotter Petré (born 1 November 1937), is a Swedish film actress. She appeared in 27 films from 1955 to 1974.

== Selected filmography ==
- Stage Entrance (1956)
- Wild Strawberries (1957)
- Mannequin in Red (1958)
- Rider in Blue (1959)
- Summer and Sinners (1960)
- The Die Is Cast (1960)
- The Lady in White (1962)
- Loving Couples (1964)
- The Cats (1965)
- The Vicious Circle (1967)
- Fanny Hill (1968)
- Vindingevals (1968)
- Ann and Eve (1968)
- Daddy, Darling (1970)
