= The New Adventures of Snow White =

1969 film directed by Rolf Thiele

- German: Grimms Märchen von lüsternen Pärchen
- Directed by: Rolf Thiele
- Written by: Jacob Grimm (stories); Wilhelm Grimm (stories); Peter Laregh; Rolf Thiele
- Produced by: Gerald Martell; Walter Tjaden
- Starring: Marie Liljedahl; Eva Rueber-Staier; Ingrid van Bergen
- Cinematography: Wolf Wirth
- Edited by: Waltraut Hopp
- Music by: Bernd Kampka
- Production company: Caro-Film
- Distributed by: Inter-Verleih Film
- Release date: 29 August 1969
- Running time: 91 minutes
- Country: West Germany
- Language: German

The New Adventures of Snow White (German: Grimms Märchen von lüsternen Pärchen, lit. 'Grimm's Fairy Tales of Lustful Couples') is a 1969 West German sex comedy film directed by Rolf Thiele and starring Marie Liljedahl, Eva Rueber-Staier, and Ingrid van Bergen. The film puts an erotic spin on three classic fairy tales Snow White, Cinderella and Sleeping Beauty. It exemplified the downturn in the career of Thiele who earlier in the decade had still been a mainstream director, but increasingly found himself making lower-budget sex comedies.

It was made at the Emelka Studios in Munich.

== Plot ==
The film is led by two traveller who are on a journey. They also meet Snow White, who climbs naked on a rock, pursued by the evil red-haired queen, who is also often naked.

The next stop is Sleeping Beauty's enchanted castle. This sleeping girl can only be awakened temporarily from her death-like slumber by a kiss, and only finally by sex. But because the travellers both turn out to be unable to have sex with her, the poor girl continues to wander through the fairytale forest, begging people and animals alike to help her in this regard or to have sex with her.

The third major story is that of Cinderella and her sisters. In addition to the main plot, the film is embellished with numerous elements of the fairy tale, such as witches, miraculous flowers and royal children transformed into animals.

== Cast ==
- Marie Liljedahl as Snow White
- Eva Rueber-Staier as Cinderella
- Ingrid van Bergen as Queen
- Gaby Fuchs as Sleeping Beauty
- Kitty Kino as Cinderella's 1st step-sister
- Evelyn Dutree as Cinderella's 2nd step-sister
- Walter Giller as Hans I
- Peter Hohberger as Heinz
- Hugo Lindinger as farmer
- Isolde Stiegler as old woman
- Roswitha Birkle as Jorinde
- Milos Gvozdich as Prince
- Stefan Seitz as Joringel

== Release ==
The film received a wide release in North America as Grimm's Fairy Tales for Adults. It made $1.1 million in the US and Canada.

The New York Times reviewed the film and said "It's as adult as almost any skin flick or striptease we've been getting in full measure these days."

== See also ==
- List of films about witchcraft
