= Emblas hemlighet =

Swedish television series

- Country of origin: Sweden
- Original language: Swedish
- No. of episodes: 32

Original release
- Network: SVT 1, Barnkanalen
- Release: 19 June – 10 August 2006

Emblas hemlighet ("Secret of Embla") is a Swedish TV series which was broadcast first during the summer of 2006, by the 2006 "Sommarlovsmorgon" Hej hej sommar.

== Plot ==
The siblings Minda (17) and Viktor (15) have finished school with excellent grades and now their summer holiday has started. Minda'll go to Brighton for studying English-language and Viktor'll go to a camp for young researchers, but their vacations are cancelled this summer when their parents are kidnapped and they must live together with their aunt Marit on her boat Embla.

Marit is searching for a treasure; Mjölnir (Thor's Hammer), which the kidnappers, a gang called "Dirty Herrings", also want to find. Minda, Viktor and Marit work together for getting the hammer and the parents. In a diary, which was in a new-found kist from the bottom of the sea, "skeppsgossen" ("The Cabin boy") has written that he wrote 3 letters to his 3 brothers and the diary and the letters may help them finding the hammer.

== Selected cast ==
- Ida Linnertorp as Minda
- Karl Linnertorp as Viktor
- Petra Brylander as Marit
- Isidor Torkar as Jean-Claude
- Robert Jelinek as Roger, chief of "Dirty Herrings"
- Hans-Christian Thulin as Snoken, member of "Dirty Herrings"
