= Axel Düberg =

Swedish actor (1927–2001)

- Born: 17 October 1927; Stockholm, Sweden
- Died: 6 October 2001 (aged 73); Stockholm, Sweden
- Occupation: Actor
- Years active: 1955-1998

Axel Düberg (17 October 1927 – 6 October 2001) was a Swedish film actor. He was born and died in Stockholm, Sweden.

== Filmography ==
Year	Title	Role	Notes
1955	Dreams	Photographer in Modefoto's studio	Uncredited
1958	Rabies	Sven, furir	TV movie
1958	The Magician	Rustan, young manservant	
1960	The Virgin Spring	Thin Herdsman	
1960	The Devil's Eye	Jonas	
1961	Karneval	Richard	
1963	Hide and Seek	Mouche	
1963	En söndag i september	Birgitta's Brother	
1963	Adam och Eva	Police officer	
1964	All These Women	Man in Black	Uncredited
1965	...för vänskaps skull...	Kalle	
1966	Woman of Darkness	Johanna Hanssons man	
1966	The Princess	Vicar	
1967	The Jungle Book	Elephant	Voice in the swedish dub
1968	Shame	Pilot	
1969	Fadern	Nöjd	
1975	Lejonet och jungfrun	Senior Enforcement Officer	
1975	Garaget	Ohlsson	
1977	Tabu	Elsa-Britta	
1979	Min älskade	Car Salesman	
1980	Kärleken	Driving instructor	
1981	Peter-No-Tail (Pelle Svanslös)	Pappa	director together with Stig Lasseby; chief animator
1982	Tintin and the Lake of Sharks	Captain Haddock	Voice in the swedish, Esselte vhs dub
1982	Brusten himmel	Nisse	
1982	Fanny and Alexander	Witness to Bishop's Death - Ekdahlska huset	
1993	Tryggare kan ingen vara...	Ek	
1994	Zorn	Priest	
