= Anne Kulle =

Swedish actress (1944–2020)

- Born: Anne Elisabet Nord; 14 January 1944; Solna, Sweden
- Died: 25 January 2020 (aged 76)
- Occupation: Actress
- Years active: 1962–2011
- Spouse: Jarl Kulle (m. 1976; deceased 1997)

Anne Elisabet Kulle (née Nord; 14 January 1944 – 25 January 2020) was a Swedish stage and screen actress. She was married to actor Jarl Kulle from 1976 until his death in 1997.

== Filmography ==
- 1962 – Åsa-Nisse på Mallorca
- 1968 – ...som havets nakna vind
- 1970 – Ministern
- 1976 – Polare
- 1977 – Eva & Kristina
- 2011 – Tjuvarnas jul (TV series)
