= Inga (film) =

1968 film

- Original title: Jag – en oskuld
- Directed by: Joseph W. Sarno
- Screenplay by: Joseph W. Sarno
- Starring: Marie Liljedahl
- Cinematography: Bruce G. Sparks
- Edited by: Ingemar Ejve
- Music by: The Bamboo Bo Waldsten
- Distributed by: Cannon Films
- Release date: 1968
- Running time: 81 minutes
- Country: Sweden
- Language: English
- Budget: $50,000
- Box office: $1.8 million (US/ Canada rentals) or $4 million

Inga is a 1968 Swedish sexploitation film directed by Joseph W. Sarno. Later that year, Sarno also directed the sequel The Seduction of Inga. The musical soundtrack of the sequel was written and performed by Björn Ulvaeus and Benny Andersson, later of the Swedish pop group ABBA.

== Plot ==
After her mother dies, Inga is sent to live with her Machiavellian Aunt Greta, who attempts to set her up as the mistress of a wealthy older man in order to pay off debts. The plan backfires when Karl, Greta's young lover, falls in love with Inga and runs away with her.

== Cast ==
- Marie Liljedahl as Inga Frilund
- Monica Strömmerstedt as Greta Johansson, Inga's aunt
- Thomas Ungewitter as Einar Nilsson, editor-in-chief
- Anne-Lise Myhrvold as Dagmar
- Casten Lassen as Karl Nistad, young writer
- Else-Marie Brandt as Frida Dagheim, maid
- Sissi Kaiser as Sigrid Nilsson, feature editor
- Rose-Marie Nilsson
- Curt Ericson as Hallstroem, boat salesman (as Kurt Eriksson)
- Lennart Norbäck as Lothar Bjoerkson
- Lotta Persson as Uta Dahlberg, judge
- Anders Beling as Birger
- Annabel Reis as Olga
- Ulf Rönnquist as Tor
- Kitty Kurkinen as Helga Lindqvist, young writer

== Censorship ==
The Italian Committee for the Theatrical Review of the Italian Ministry of Cultural Heritage and Activities did not approve the release of Inga in Italy. The reason for the denial, cited in the official documents, is: the immorality of its characters and the subject, and the numerous sexual scenes that they considered offensive to decency. Two years later, in 1971, the Movie Reviewing Commission, approved the projection of the movie, but rated it as VM18: not suitable for children under 18. In addition, the Committee imposed the removal of the following scenes: 1) the scene of the ritual of the Virgin (trial); 2) the scene in which Inga masturbates; 3) the scene in which Inga and the young man see each other for the third time and are in bed.
