= Labyrint (Swedish TV series) =

Swedish drama television series

- Created by: Johan Tappert; Lars Lundström Molly Hartleb Erik Leijonborg
- Starring: Jonas Malmsjö; Robert Jelinek; Isabelle Moreau; Björn Bengtsson; Meliz Karlge di Grado
- Country of origin: Sweden
- No. of episodes: 12

Production
- Running time: approx. 45 minutes

Original release
- Network: TV4
- Release: October 11, 2007

Labyrint is a Swedish drama television series on TV4. It has been called the channel's biggest production ever. The show premiered on October 11, 2007.

== Characters ==
Main roles

Role	Actor / Actress
Fredrik Hermelin	Jonas Malmsjö
Zahra Haidari	Meliz Karlge di Grado
Jonny Johansson	Björn Bengtsson
Filippa Bolinder	Isabelle Moraeu
Carl Ramhäll	Robert Jelinek

Family

Role	Actor / Actress
Miranda Perez	Mirja Turestedt
Göran Bolinder	Fredrik Dolk
Sofi Ramhäll	Linda Zilliacus
Sandra Ramhäll	Hedda Wachtmeister
Kasper Ramhäll	Dexter Ericsson
Meriam Haidari	Mina Azarian
Besym Haidari	Hassan Brijany
Samo Haidari	Danilo Bejarano
Akram Haidari	Hassan Jafari
Nino Haidari	Armand Mirpour
Louise Hermelin	Karin Bergquist
Gabriella Hermelin	Alexandra Nekrassova
Fredrika Hermelin	Viktoria Genberg
Monica Hermelin	Karin Bergquist

Blue

Role	Actor / Actress
Henry Strolz	Ulf Brunnberg
Stig	Per Morberg
Hanson	Jonas Inde
Per	Christer Fant
Nicky	Noomi Rapace
