= Vindingevals =

1968 film

- Directed by: Åke Falck
- Starring: Georg Rydeberg
- Release date: 25 September 1968
- Running time: 99 minutes
- Country: Sweden
- Language: Swedish

Vindingevals is a 1968 Swedish drama film directed by Åke Falck.

== Cast ==
- Georg Rydeberg as Mr. Håkansson
- Keve Hjelm as The Man
- Diana Kjær as Elvira Kron
- Erik Hell as Oskar Kron
- Hans Ernback as Gustav Kron
- Gio Petré as Hanna Urström
- Kent Andersson as Alexander
