= Gunnar Mattsson =

Finnish writer and journalist (1937 - 1989)

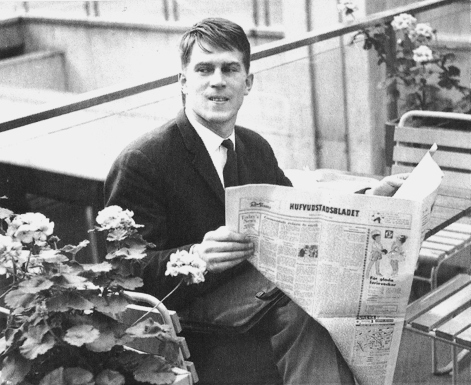
Mattsson in 1963.

Kaj Gunnar Wolter Mattsson (5 May 1937 – 9 August 1989) was a Swedish-speaking Finnish writer and journalist. Mattsson rose to fame as a result of his book Prinsessan. The book was translated into some thirty languages, including English, it was a bestseller in Finland and was filmed as A Time in the Sun in Sweden. His other notable works include the sequel Prinsen (The Prince, 1966), Jätten (The Giant, 1969), and Kungen (The King, 1971).

== Biography ==
Mattsson was born in Helsinki to sea captain Wolter Eugene Mattsson and bank clerk Elli Gertrud Eriksson. He attended the Swedish secondary school in Kimito. He worked as a journalist for the Vestmanlands Läns Tidning newspaper in Sweden from 1961 to 1963, and then for Hufvudstadsbladet from 1963. He married Virpi Augustin in 1961, and they divorced the same year; in 1964 he married Seija Terhikki Lainela. Suffering from alcoholism, he committed suicide at the age of 52 in Helsinki.
