= The Snake (Dagerman novel) =

1945 novel by Stig Dagerman

- Author: Stig Dagerman
- Original title: Ormen
- Translator: Laurie Thompson
- Language: Swedish
- Publisher: Steinsvik
- Publication date: 1945
- Publication place: Sweden
- English publication date: 1995
- Pages: 310

The Snake (Swedish: Ormen) is the 1945 debut novel of the Swedish writer Stig Dagerman. It is in two parts: the first is about two people who think they may have killed someone, and the second is set among Swedish conscripts during World War II. The book focuses on anxiety, tension and absurdity. Siri Hustvedt describes it as "a text in which the metaphorical and the literal mingle to such a degree that by its end, the two have merged entirely".

The book was adapted for film in 1966 as Ormen, starring Christina Schollin, Harriet Andersson and Hans Ernback.
