= Dorian Gray (1970 film) =

1970 film

- Theatrical release poster by Ted CoConis
- Italian: Il dio chiamato Dorian
- Directed by: Massimo Dallamano
- Screenplay by: Marcello Coscia; Massimo Dallamano
- Based on: The Picture of Dorian Gray by Oscar Wilde
- Produced by: Harry Alan Towers
- Starring: Helmut Berger; Richard Todd; Herbert Lom; Marie Liljedahl; Margaret Lee
- Cinematography: Otello Spila
- Edited by: Nicholas Wentworth
- Music by: Peppino De Luca; Carlos Pes
- Production companies: Sargon Film; Terra-Filmkunst; Towers of London
- Distributed by: Panta Cinematografica (Italy); Constantin Film (West Germany); Hemdale (UK)
- Release dates: 24 April 1970 (West Germany); 9 December 1970 (US)
- Running time: 101 minutes (UK); 93 minutes (US)
- Countries: Italy; West Germany; United Kingdom; Liechtenstein
- Language: English

Dorian Gray (Italian: Il dio chiamato Dorian, lit. 'The God called Dorian'; also known as The Sins of Dorian Gray and The Secret of Dorian Gray) is a 1970 horror drama film directed and co-written by Massimo Dallamano, produced by Harry Alan Towers, based on Oscar Wilde's 1890 novel The Picture of Dorian Gray. It stars Helmut Berger in the title role, along with Richard Todd, Herbert Lom, Marie Liljedahl and Margaret Lee.

== Plot ==
The film opens in medias res. In 1970s London, Dorian Gray stumbles away from the corpse of Basil Hallward and towards a bathroom sink, his hands covered in Basil's blood.

Some decades prior, Dorian, Basil, and Alan Campbell drink in a London strip club. They separate, and Dorian enters an empty theatre. He discovers Sybil Vane rehearsing the part of Juliet from Romeo and Juliet. They explore the city, having hot dogs and coffee and drinking water from a fountain. After Sybil takes him back to the theater, she plays a recording of Romeo and Juliet and the two have sex. The next morning, she admits to Dorian that she was a virgin.

Dorian heads to Basil's studio. While sitting for a portrait, he tells Basil of his newfound love for Sybil. Basil's client Henry Wotton arrives with his wife, and the two offer to buy the portrait for their gallery. The couple, particularly Mrs. Wotton, admire Dorian, who is outside rinsing off after a swim. They step outside to make introductions, discussing Oscar Wilde and debating the worth or lack thereof of marriage. Henry stresses the value of Dorian's youth and beauty over all else. As a result, after Basil finishes the portrait, Dorian becomes distressed and upset that the painting should remain beautiful while he ages. He refuses to allow Basil to sell it to the Wottons. Henry allows him to keep the portrait, as Dorian declares that he would sell his soul to stay young while the portrait ages.

Dorian and Sybil's romance continues, and Dorian takes her to see the ruined mansion he inherited from his parents, Selby. However, as Dorian continues to mingle with Henry and his high society friends, he grows crueler and more shallow, eventually pushing Sybil away. This comes to a head when Dorian and Henry's friends attend one of Sybil's performance as Juliet. The show is terrible, and most of the party walks out. After Dorian and Sybil argue on the car ride to the Wotton's, she leaves in frustration; he follows her, slaps her, and declares he is leaving her. A distressed Sybil commits suicide by walking into oncoming traffic. Meanwhile, Dorian returns to the Wottons and has sex with Mrs. Wotton. The next morning, Henry reveals to Dorian that Sybil has killed herself. He vehemently denies his own responsibility. Later he discovers that his portrait has developed an angry wrinkle in its forehead. Dorian covers the portrait and takes a paint sample to scientist Alan, who tells Dorian that there is nothing strange within the paint itself. An uneasy Dorian stores the concealed portrait in a hidden room in his home.

Over several years, Dorian descends into excess, promiscuity, and hedonism, soon becoming infamous for his exploits. He sells Selby to a rich American woman after a deal that includes a sexual encounter in her stables. He makes business deals with the money, which he uses to further fund his hedonism, and buys a yacht. After an encounter with Henry in the shower, Dorian begins sleeping with men as well, cruising all over London. He finally becomes an adult entertainment star, growing ever wealthier and known off his modeling and his infamy. Alan, Basil, and Henry continue to grow older, visibly aging as they enter their 50s; meanwhile, Dorian's portrait continues to grow older and more warped as he remains young and beautiful.

At a party, Alan reunites with Dorian after some years, expressing shock at his still-youthful appearance. He introduces Dorian to his younger fiancée. The couple and Dorian's adult entertainment friends go to a nightclub; after one of Dorian's friends accompany a drunk Alan home, Dorian takes Alan's fiancée back to his own home and coerces her into sex. Outside the room, one of Dorian's friend covertly takes photographs of their encounter. At another party, Basil introduces Dorian to another friend and his wife. Dorian and the married woman show interest in each other. Later, Basil meets Dorian at his home before leaving for an exhibition in France. Basil argues with Dorian not to destroy a family for the sake of his own hedonism, as the couple have two children. As their fight progresses, an enraged Dorian drags Basil up to the room where he has stored the portrait. He removes the curtain and shows it to a disbelieving Basil, whose signature proves that the painting is his own. As Dorian stabs Basil, the story picks back up from the film's opening scene. Dorian uses the photographs of his sexual encounter with Alan's wife to blackmail the man into disposing of Basil's body. Dorian also encounters James Vane, who nearly kills him in revenge for Sybil; Dorian narrowly avoids being attacked by claiming he doesn't know who she is and is too young to have been her "Romeo".

Some time later, Henry and Dorian discuss Basil's mysterious disappearance. Henry, now visibly middle aged, laments having to witness himself grow old while Dorian remains beautiful. Dorian, disturbed by the deterioration of his portrait, resolves to become a better man. However, he is again shaken when James Vane finds him on a hunting trip. A man in his party accidentally shoots James in the chest, killing him instantly. Afterward, Dorian watches the news in a bar; he learns of recent US escalation of the Vietnam War and that Alan has committed suicide by sleeping pill overdose.

Dorian, distraught and hopeless, returns home and to his portrait. He unveils it. Grabbing the same long knife he used to kill Basil, he stabs himself. Dorian's corpse is shown gnarled and aged on the ground, while his portrait has returned to its original youthful state.

== Cast ==
- Helmut Berger as Dorian Gray
- Richard Todd as Basil Hallward
- Herbert Lom as Henry Wotton
- Marie Liljedahl as Sibyl Vane / Gladys Monmouth
- Margaret Lee as Gwendolyn Wotton
- Maria Rohm as Alice Campbell
- Beryl Cunningham as Adrienne
- Isa Miranda as Patricia Ruxton
- Eleonora Rossi Drago as Esther Clouston
- Renato Romano as Alan Campbell
- Stewart Black as James Vane

== Adaptation ==
The film stresses the decadence and eroticism of the story and changes the setting to early 1970s London. The sexual liberation of the late 1960s and early 1970s provides a fitting backdrop for Dorian's escapades in this version, and also the general clothing and fashion style of the era is extrapolated into a 1970s version of the aesthetic, decadent world of the 1890s novel.

A marked difference between this version and the novel is the final scene. Instead of Dorian slicing the painting with the knife (thereby inadvertently killing himself), he is seen committing suicide with the knife deliberately.

== Critical reception ==
Critical opinion of the film is decidedly mixed. On the one hand, some consider the film trash and sexploitation, while others point out that the film was shot at a unique time in the 20th century when a new openness about sexuality and its depiction on film allowed showing scenes only vaguely hinted at in the novel and earlier (and also later) movie adaptations.

== Home media ==
The film was released on Blu-Ray by boutique label Kino Lorber in 2013.

== See also ==
- Adaptations of The Picture of Dorian Gray
