= The Bookseller Gave Up Bathing =

1969 film

- Directed by: Jarl Kulle
- Starring: Allan Edwall
- Release date: 7 April 1969
- Running time: 100 minutes
- Country: Sweden
- Language: Swedish

The Bookseller Gave Up Bathing (Swedish: Bokhandlaren som slutade bada) is a 1969 Swedish drama film directed by Jarl Kulle.

== Cast ==
- Allan Edwall as Jacob
- Margaretha Krook as Amelie Arbel
- Jarl Kulle as Krakow
- Ingvar Kjellson as Elim Svensson
- Nils Eklund as Stickselius
- Olof Bergström as Trolle
- Ulla Sjöblom as Mrs. Borodin
- Göran Stangertz as Rikard
- Chris Wahlström as Sabina
- Georg Skarstedt as Undertaker
- Göthe Grefbo as Priest
- Hans Strååt as Vicar
