= Inside Jennifer Welles =

1977 film

- Film Poster
- Directed by: Jennifer Welles; Joseph W. Sarno (Uncredited)
- Written by: Jennifer Welles
- Produced by: Don Walters
- Starring: Jennifer Welles; Ken Anderson; Peter Andrews; Cheri Baines; Robert Kerman
- Cinematography: James Hammerhill
- Production company: Evart Enterprises
- Distributed by: Video Home Library; TVX; Video-X-Pix; Cinépix Film Properties (CFP)
- Release date: July 1977
- Running time: 108 min.
- Country: United States
- Language: English

Inside Jennifer Welles is a 1977 pornographic film starring Jennifer Welles, an American porn star chiefly active in the soft and hardcore genres of the 1970s, although she began her acting career in the late 1960s in the sexploitation genre. The allegedly autobiographical film is one of the classics of the Golden Age of Porn.

The credits for Inside Jennifer Welles (1977) credit Welles with being the director, although the film was actually anonymously directed by sexploitation veteran Joseph W. Sarno.

== Cast ==
- Jennifer Welles as herself
- Ken Anderson as Dr. Ward
- Peter Andrews as Bert's Roommate
- Cheri Baines as Miss Haskell
- Robert Kerman as Projectionist
- Carter Stevens as Painter
