= The Firebird (1952 film) =

- Directed by: Hasse Ekman
- Written by: Hasse Ekman
- Produced by: Lorens Marmstedt
- Starring: Tito Gobbi; Ellen Rasch; Eva Henning; Georg Rydeberg
- Cinematography: Göran Strindberg
- Edited by: Lennart Wallén
- Music by: Stig Rybrant
- Distributed by: Terrafilm
- Release date: 12 August 1952
- Running time: 99 minutes
- Countries: Sweden; Italy
- Language: English

The Firebird (Swedish: Eldfågeln, Italian: L'uccello di fuoco) is a 1952 Swedish-Italian musical drama film directed by Hasse Ekman. The film is inspired by The Red Shoes by Powell and Pressburger.

== Plot summary ==
A famous Italian tenor gets an offer to make a guest appearance in Sweden, but is unwilling to go, until he sees a Swedish dance film with the beautiful ballerina Linda Corina. He travels to the Royal Opera in Stockholm, and falls in love with her. And so, a passionate and colourful drama begins.

== Cast ==
- Tito Gobbi as Mario Vanni, Italian operasinger
- Ellen Rasch as Linda Corina, prima ballerina
- Eva Henning as Alice Lund
- Bengt Blomgren as Frank
- Georg Rydeberg as Jascha Sacharowitch
- Åke Falck as Spinky, Vannis impresario
- Märta Arbin as Frank's mother
- Alan Blair as Johan A. Sjöberg, Lindas doctor
- Märta Dorff as Seamstress at the Operan
- Gull Natorp as Tilda, dresser at the Operan
- Björn Holmgren as John, Dancer
- Gun Skoogberg as Dancer
- Maurice Béjart as Alex, Dancer
