= Robert Jelinek =

Swedish actor

See also Robert Jelinek (artist), Robert Jelinek (musician).

Robert Thomas Jelinek (born 20 September 1969 in Solna, Sweden) is a Swedish actor.

== Selected filmography ==
- 1987 – Stockholmsnatt
- 1988 – PS Sista sommaren
- 1998 – Beck – Vita nätter
- 1999 – Dödlig drift
- 2000 – Naken
- 2006 – Emblas hemlighet (TV)
- 2007 – Gynekologen i Askim (TV)
- 2007 – Labyrint (TV)
- 2007 – Arn – The Knight Templar
- 2009 – Wallander – Prästen
- 2024 - [I dina händer]
