= Helli Louise =

Danish actress (1949–2018)

- Born: 2 August 1949; Copenhagen, Denmark
- Died: 22 June 2018 (aged 68); England

Helli Louise Brunchmann Jacobson, often billed as Helli Louise (2 August 1949 – 22 June 2018), was a Danish born actress who appeared in British films and television, including The Benny Hill Show, during the 1970s.

== Career ==
Jacobson was born on 2 August 1949 in Copenhagen, Denmark. She moved to the United Kingdom in the early 1970s, studying at the London Film School c. 1971, and developing a curious Copenhagen/Cockney accent along the way. Represented by Barrie Stacey Promotions during her British acting career, she appeared in John Jesnor Lindsay's film The Hot Girls (1974), a fake exposé of the modelling world. More mainstream work included guest appearances in The Sweeney and The Goodies, and roles in Carry On Behind (1975) and several other British sex comedies. Jacobson was also active on stage appearing in a touring production of Hair in 1974, and in the stage farce Pyjama Tops (c. 1973) where co-stars included Fiona Richmond, Jess Conrad and Lucienne Camille.

Aside from her acting career Jacobson was also the managing director of a clothing firm, and worked in the music industry managing a band called Ix. After a role in 1979's The World Is Full of Married Men, she left acting to pursue work in the music industry full-time, and then worked for Harvey Goldsmith.

== Filmography ==
- The Daughter: I, a Woman Part III (1970) - Patient
- Daddy, Darling (1970) - Katja
- Nana (1970) - Simone
- 24 hours with Ilse (1971) - herself (documentary)
- Christa (1971) - Inge (uncredited)
- Dagmar's Hot Pants, Inc. (1971) - Dagmar's girlfriend Britta
- Soft Beds, Hard Battles (1973) - Prostitute (uncredited)
- The Hot Girls (1974, short) - Helli, lesbian scene
- Confessions of a Pop Performer (1975) - Eva
- The Ups and Downs of a Handyman (1976) - Newsagent's daughter
- Hardcore (1977) - Third 'Men Only' Girl (uncredited)
- The World Is Full of Married Men (1979) - Paul's backing group

== TV films ==
- Udsigt til garden og gaden (1970) - Susanne, datteren
- Lille dosis strindberg (1970) - Martha Magdalene
- The Goodies and the Beanstalk (1973) - Girl with the Puppies

== TV appearances ==
- Salto Mortale – "Helli Louise Brunchmann" in the episode "Gastspiel in Kopenhagen" (1971)
- The Benny Hill Show – various roles in the episode "Jackie Wright's Holiday" (1973)
- Up Sunday - in the episode? (197?)
- The Goodies - Girl with the Puppies in "The Goodies and the Beanstalk (1973), Eskimo Nell in the episode "Winter Olympics" (1973), and Dana in the episode "The Race" (1974)
- Love Thy Neighbour, Angie - in episodes No. 4.4 (1974) and No. 5.3 (1975)
- The Sweeney - 2nd girl in pub in the episode "Golden Boy" (1975)

== Stage plays ==
- Pyjama Tops (1973?) – Claudine Amour
- The Empire Builders (197?)
- The Marriage-Go-Round (197?)
- The Bed (197?)
- The Informer (197?)
- Hair (1974) – Tribe member

== External sources ==
- Keeping the British End Up: Four Decades of Saucy Cinema by Simon Sheridan (Titan Books) (4th edition) 2011
- Titbits magazine No. 4721, September 9–15, 1976 – Helli's Biggest Sin by Douglas Marlborough
