= Kentin Jivek =

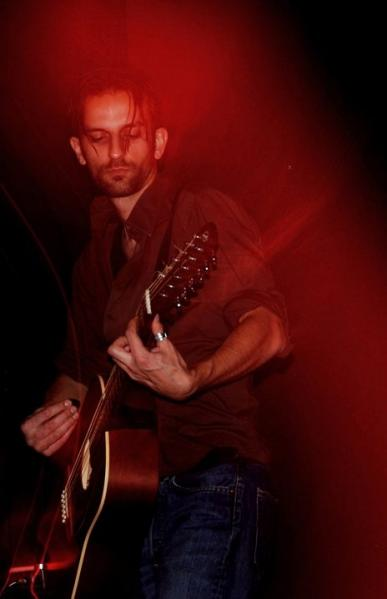
- Live at Dazzle Club Berlin, 2011

Background information
- Born: 1980 (age 45–46); Bordeaux, France
- Genres: Darkfolk, psychedelic
- Occupations: Singer-songwriter, musician
- Instruments: Vocals, keyboards, guitar
- Label: Urgence Disk Records
- Website: kentinjivek.com

Kentin Jivek is a French singer-songwriter within the genres of dark folk and psychedelic folk. His songs contain themes of beliefs and stories from mythology and folklore, with lyrics in French, English and Spanish.

== Influences ==
Some of Jivek's French-language songs are influenced by Léo Ferré, in the vocals and the minimalist structure. In other songs, the influences of Current 93, Dead Can Dance are visible.

== Discography ==
- Eight New Prophecies (September 2009), review by Evening of Light and The Shadow Commence
- Ode to Marmaele (April 2010) received positive reviews from Judas Kiss magazine, German magazineIkonen, French magazine Longueur d'Ondes, and a Finnish magazine. It was described by David Tibet as a "really haunting album full of oddity and great beauty".
- "Now I'm Black Moon"
- The song "What if" was released on the compilation Thanateros – Visions of Love & Death (Ikonen, 2011)
- Third Eye (March 2012)
- Blue Zaxon (November 2021)
- The seahorse complexe (August 2022)
