= Thorsten Jonsson =

Swedish author, journalist and translator

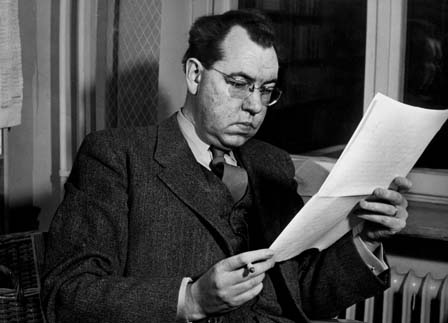
Thorsten Jonsson

Thorsten Jonsson (1910–1950) was a Swedish writer, journalist and translator.

Jonsson grew up in a small village in Västerbotten. He studied at Stockholms högskola and then worked as journalist for various newspapers, including Dagens Nyheter. In 1943 he became Dagens Nyheters correspondent in United States. A selection of his articles as a correspondent were published in the book Sidor av Amerika in 1946.

Jonsson was praised for his translations of American writers like Ernest Hemingway and John Steinbeck and wrote several essays on contemporary American literature. Six studies were published in the book Sex amerikaner: Hemingway, Faulkner, Steinbeck, Caldwell, Farrell, Saroyan in 1942.

As a writer he published two books of poems, two short story collections and the acclaimed novel Konvoj, published in 1947. Dimman från havet, a book of four stories set in America, an essay collection and his collected short stories were published posthumously.

== Bibliography ==
- Utflykt, 1933
- Stor-Norrland och litteraturen, 1938
- Som ett träd, 1939
- Som det brukar vara, 1939
- Martin Koch, 1941
- Fly till vatten och morgon, 1941
- Sex amerikaner: Hemingway, Faulkner, Steinbeck, Caldwell, Farrell, Saroyan, 1942
- Sidor av Amerika: Intryck och resonemang, 1946
- Konvoj, 1947
- Dimman från havet, 1950
- Synpunkter, 1951
- Noveller, 1955
- Berättelser från Amerika, 2007

Translations (selected)

- A. J. Cronin Citadellet (The Citadel), 1938
- Ernest Hemingway Att ha och inte ha (To Have and Have Not), 1939
- John Steinbeck Vredens druvor (The Grapes of Wrath), 1940
- Ernest Hemingway Klockan klämtar för dig (For Whom the Bell Tolls), 1940
- Daniel Defoe Robinson Crusoe, 1942
- Ernest Hemingway Snön på Kilimandjaro och andra noveller (The Snows of Kilimanjaro), 1942
- Erskine Caldwell Avlöning vid Savannah River (Savannah River Payday), 1942
- John Steinbeck Den långa dalen (The Long Valley), 1943
- John Steinbeck Månen har gått ned (The Moon is Down), 1943
- Dylan Thomas En varm lördag (One Warm Saturday), 1943
- E. E. Cummings poems, included in Sidor av Amerika, 1946
- Mörk sång: Fyrtiofem amerikanska negerdikter (anthology of afroamerican poetry), 1949
