= Joseph W. Sarno =

American film director and screenwriter (1921–2010)

- Born: Joseph William Sarno; March 15, 1921; New York City, US
- Died: April 26, 2010 (aged 89); New York City, US
- Occupations: Film director, screenwriter
- Notable work: Inga (1968), Laura's Toys (1975), Abigail Lesley Is Back in Town (1975)
- Spouse: Peggy Steffans (m. 1970)

Joseph William Sarno (March 15, 1921 – April 26, 2010) was an American film director and screenwriter.

Sarno emerged from the semi-pornographic sexploitation film genre of the 1950s and 1960s; he had written and directed approximately 75 theatrically released feature films in the sexploitation, softcore and hardcore genres as well as a number of shot-on-video features for the 1980s hardcore video market.

== Early life ==
Sarno was born in 1921 and grew up in Amityville on Long Island.

== Career ==
Sarno, a pioneer of the sexploitation film genre, completed his first adult-oriented feature, Nude in Charcoal, in 1961. Among his best-known films in the genre are Sin in the Suburbs (1964), which was about wife swapping, Flesh and Lace, The Swap and How They Made It (1966), in which his wife appeared, and Moonlighting Wives (1966). Sarno's work of the sexploitation period was typified by stark chiaroscuro lighting, long takes, and rigorous staging. He was also well known for scenarios centering on issues of psycho-sexual anxiety and sexual identity development.

During his sexploitation period, Sarno worked with such actors as Uta Erickson, Dyanne Thorne (star of the Ilsa series), Audrey Campbell (Olga's House of Shame series), Michael Alaimo, Patricia McNair, Tod Moore, and his cousin, Joe Santos, who would become a regular on television's The Rockford Files.

Beginning in 1968, Sarno's work became somewhat more explicit, predicting the emergence of softcore porn. His breakthrough feature Inga (1968) was one of the first X-rated films released in the United States. Other noteworthy soft-core features include All the Sins of Sodom (1968), Vibrations (1968), Passion in Hot Hollows (1969), Daddy, Darling (1970), Young Playthings (1972), Confessions of a Young American Housewife (1974, which was about foursomes), and Misty (1975). Sarno was also the director of Deep Throat Part 2 (1974), the R-rated sequel to the hardcore classic Deep Throat.

After 1968, Sarno's soft-core work was divided between films produced in the United States and films produced in Europe, principally Sweden, Germany, and Denmark. Many of Sarno's European features were made with American backing. In Europe, he was known for having worked with actresses Marie Liljedahl, Christina Lindberg, Helli Louise, and Marie Forså.

Sarno's first hardcore feature was Sleepyhead (1973) featuring Georgina Spelvin and Tina Russell. Reluctant to be associated with the hardcore genre, Sarno began directing explicit films under various pseudonyms, like "Karl Andersson" in Touch of Genie (1974). He acknowledges being the uncredited director of such adult features as Inside Jennifer Welles (1977) starring Jennifer Welles and Deep Inside Annie Sprinkle (1981) starring Annie Sprinkle. Over the course of his hardcore career, Sarno worked with such adult film stars as Harry Reems, Eric Edwards, Jamie Gillis, Marc Stevens, Rick Savage, Marlene Willoughby, Gloria Leonard, Sonny Landham, Seka, and Ron Jeremy.

== Personal life and death ==
In 1970, Sarno married Peggy Steffans, who was 17 years his junior. Steffans was a non-sex performing actress, assistant director and costumer in several of his films. Together they had a son, Matthew.

Sarno died of natural causes on April 26, 2010, at the age of 89 in his native New York City. Steffans died on February 8, 2026, at age 87.

== Critical reputation ==
Singled out for praise by critic Andrew Sarris during the 1970s, Sarno's work has been acknowledged in recent years by tributes at the New York Underground Film Festival, the Torino Film Festival in Turin, Italy, the Cinémathèque Française in Paris, and The Andy Warhol Museum.

Sarno has had a tribute at the British Film Institute in London and has given an honorary lecture at Lund University in Sweden.

His career is being researched for a comprehensive biography by film historian Michael J. Bowen.

Virgile Iscan interviewed Joe Sarno and his wife shortly before Sarno's death in 2010. The interviews appear in Iscan's documentary The Divine Joe Sarno.

A Life in Dirty Movies is a 2013 Swedish documentary about Sarno and his wife, and their attempt to make one last film.

== Selected filmography ==
- Sin in the Suburbs (1964)
- The Swap and How They Make It (1966)
- Moonlighting Wives (1966)
- Red Roses in Passion (1966)
- The Love Merchant (1966)
- Deep Inside (1968)
- Inga (1968)
- All the Sins of Sodom (1968)
- The Seduction of Inga (1968)
- Daddy Darling (1970)
- The Devil's Plaything (1973)
- Deep Throat, Part II (1974)
- Confessions of a Young American Housewife (1974)
- Butterfly (1975)
- Abigail Leslie Is Back in Town (1974)
- Laura's Toys (1975)
- Misty (1976)
- Inside Jennifer Welles (1977)
- All About Gloria Leonard (1978)
- Inside Seka (1980)
- Deep Inside Annie Sprinkle (1981)
- Suburban Secrets (2004)
- A Life in Dirty Movies (2013)
