= Erik Lindegren =

Swedish author, poet and critical writer

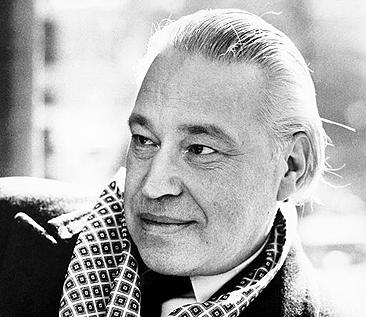
- Erik Lindegren in the year 1954
- Born: 5 August 1910; Luleå
- Died: 31 May 1968 (aged 57); Hedvig Eleonora parish
- Occupation: Translator, librettist, poet, writer, critic
- Position held: seat 17 of the Swedish Academy (1962–1968)

Erik Lindegren (5 August 1910 – 31 May 1968) was a Swedish author, poet, critical writer and member of the Swedish Academy (1962–68, chair 17). Grandson of composer Johan Lindegren.

Lindegren was born in Luleå, Norrbotten County, the son of a railway engineer. With Gunnar Ekelöf, he belonged to the most prominent exponents of the lyric modernism flourishing in his country, especially from the 1940s. His poetry books include the surreal "shattered sonnets" in mannen utan väg ("The Man Without a Way", title without capital M; 1942, a breakthrough work of its generation and a central work in fyrtiotalism literature), Sviter ("Suites", 1947) and Vinteroffer ("Winter Sacrifice", 1954). He translated the works of T. S. Eliot, Rainer Maria Rilke, Graham Greene, Saint-John Perse, Dylan Thomas, William Faulkner, Paul Claudel and many others into Swedish.

He took a keen interest in music, opera and the visual arts, and was an accomplished opera librettist at the Royal Swedish Opera, and also an informed and enthusiastic opera critic. Lindegren wrote the libretto for Karl-Birger Blomdahl's space opera Aniara among others. Between 1948 and 1950 he led the literary magazine Prisma, one of the most lavish and broad ever produced in Sweden, aiming to "gauge the state of the arts in the present".

Lindegren was elected a member of the Swedish Academy in 1962 and a member of the Academy's Nobel committee between 1964 and 1968. He died from pancreatic cancer in 1968.

== Notes ==
Cultural offices
Preceded by Dag Hammarskjöld	Swedish Academy, Seat No.17; 1962–1968	Succeeded by Johannes Edfelt
