= Hans Ernback =

Swedish actor (1942–2013)

- Born: 27 March 1942; Luleå, Sweden
- Died: 19 February 2013 (aged 70); Stockholm, Sweden
- Occupation: Actor
- Years active: 1966–1984

Hans Erik Ernback (27 March 1942 – 19 February 2013) was a Swedish actor, stage director, playwright, and visual artist. He appeared in more than 20 films and television productions between 1966 and 1984.

== Filmography ==
Year	Title	Role	Notes
1966	Ormen	Bill Stenberg	
1966	Adamsson i Sverige	Rikard Adamsson	
1967	Roseanna	Folke Bengtsson	
1967	Bränt barn	Bengt Lundin	
1968	Vindingevals	Gustav Kron	
1968	Fanny Hill	Roger Boman	
1970	Nana	Hoffman	
1971	Midsommardansen	Pekka	
1977	Games of Love and Loneliness	Narrator	Voice
1979	Linus eller Tegelhusets hemlighet	Helge	
1981	Operation Leo		
