= Jarl Kulle =

Swedish actor (1927–1997)

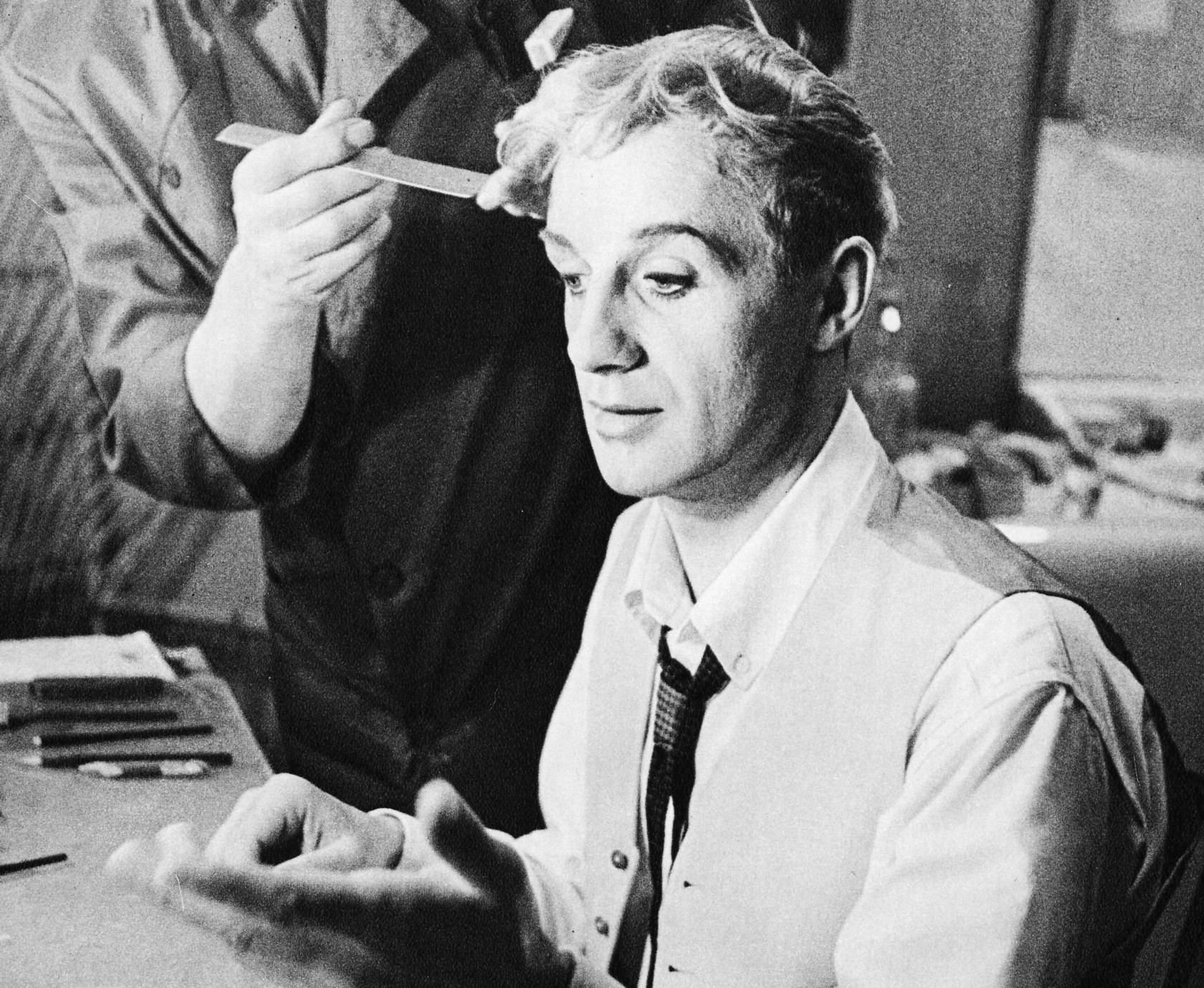
- Kulle in the early 1960s
- Born: Jarl Lage Kulle; 28 February 1927; Bjuv, Sweden
- Died: 3 October 1997 (aged 70); Österåker, Sweden
- Resting place: Roslags-Kulla Church
- Occupations: Actor; director
- Years active: 1946–1995
- Spouses: Louise Hermelin (m. 1960; div. 1968) Anne Kulle (m. 1976)
- Children: 5 (including Maria)

Jarl Lage Kulle (28 February 1927 – 3 October 1997) was a Swedish film and stage actor and director, and father of Maria Kulle.

Kulle was born in the village of Truedstorp, outside Ekeby, Sweden, and was the son of the merchant Nils Kulle and Mia Bergendahl. Kulle was one of the leading Swedish stage actors of his generation and often appeared in TV productions, at the Royal Dramatic Theatre of Stockholm as well as in a number of films, several of these directed by Ingmar Bergman. Taking on many star parts of the classical and modern repertory, appearing in contemporary TV drama and musicals and armed with remarkable gifts for both comedy, romantic drama and slightly declamatory but controlled pathos, he was one of Sweden's most loved modern actors.

In 1965 he won the award for Best Actor for his role in drama film Swedish Wedding Night at the 2nd Guldbagge Awards. He won his second Guldbagge Best Actor award for Fanny and Alexander at the 19th Guldbagge Awards in 1983.

In 1960, Kulle married Louise Hermelin (born 1939), daughter of a cavalry captain, Baron Carl-Magnus Hermelin and Ann-Marie Sourander. They divorced in 1968. In 1976, Kulle married the actress Anne Nord. Kulle died in Gregersboda, Sweden in October 1997 of bone cancer.

== Awards ==
Kulle received many awards throughout his career. In 1952, he was the second actor to be awarded the Thaliapriset theatre award by the Swedish daily newspaper Svenska Dagbladet. He was also awarded the Gösta Ekman-stipendiet award in 1954, an award established in 1939 in memory of the actor and theatre director Gösta Ekman.

== Filmography ==
Year	Title	Role	Notes	Ref.
1946	Affairs of a Model	Guest at Den Gyldene Tunnan		
1946	Youth in Danger	The Yankee		
1950	The Quartet That Split Up	Thure Borg		
1951	Living on 'Hope'	Jalle		
1952	Defiance	Jerka		
1952	Love	Wilhelm Andreasson		
1952	Secrets of Women	Kaj		
1952	69:an, sergeanten och jag	Lieutenant Fryklund		
1953	Barabbas	Leper at Death Valley		
1954	Karin Månsdotter	Eric XIV of Sweden		
1955	Smiles of a Summer Night	Count Carl-Magnus Malcolm		
1956	Last Pair Out	Dr. Farell		
1956	The Song of the Scarlet Flower	Olof Koskela		
1957	A Dreamer's Journey	Dan Andersson		
1957	No Tomorrow	Viktor Aaltonen		
1958	Miss April	Osvald Berg		
1959	Sängkammartjuven	Johan Jacob Wenkel		
1960	Heart's Desire	Baron Patrik Sinclair		
1960	The Devil's Eye	Don Juan		
1961	Do You Believe in Angels?	Jan Froman		
1961	Lita på mej, älskling!	Karl Särner		
1962	Adventures of Nils Holgersson	Mårten Gåskarl (voice)		
1962	Den kære familie	Count Claes af Lejonstam		
1962	Kort är sommaren	Thomas Glahn		
1963	The Girl and the Press Photographer	Himself		
1964	All These Women	Cornelius		
1964	Är du inte riktigt klok?	Hans Ringmar		
1964	Swedish Wedding Night	Hilmer Westlund		
1964	Dear John	John Berndtsson		
1966	My Sister, My Love	Baron Alsmeden, Charlotte's Fiancé		
1969	The Bookseller Gave Up Bathing	Corporal Krakow	Also director	
1969	Miss and Mrs. Sweden	Leif Mix		
1970	Ministern	The Minister		
1972	Ture Sventon, privatdetektiv	Ture Sventon		
1974	Vita nejlikan eller Den barmhärtige sybariten	Teacher	Also director	
1981	Rasmus på luffen	Hilding Lif		
1982	Fanny and Alexander	Gustav Adolf Ekdahl		
1987	Babette's Feast	General Lorens Löwenhielm		
1990	Herman	Panten		
1993	The Telegraphist	Mack		
1994	Zorn	Oscar II		
1995	Alfred	Immanuel Nobel		
1995	Som krossat glas i en hårt knuten hand	Himself	Final film role	
