= Island of the Doomed =

1946 novel by Stig Dagerman

- Author: Stig Dagerman
- Original title: De dömdas ö
- Translator: Laurie Thompson
- Language: Swedish
- Publisher: Norstedts förlag
- Publication date: 1946
- Publication place: Sweden
- English publication date: 1991
- Pages: 311

Island of the Doomed (Swedish: De dömdas ö) is a 1946 novel by the Swedish writer Stig Dagerman about five men and two women who become castaways on an island populated by blind birds and aggressive iguanas.
