= Jennifer Welles =

American pornographic actress

- Born: March 15, 1937; New Jersey, U.S
- Died: June 26, 2018 (aged 81); Arizona, U.S.
- Other name: Lisa Duran
- Occupation: Pornographic actress
- Height: 5 ft 2 in (1.57 m)

Jennifer Welles (March 15, 1937 – June 26, 2018) was an American former pornographic actress in films of the 1970s, although she began her acting career in the late 1960s in the softcore sexploitation genre films produced in New York. Some of these include: Sex by Advertisement (1967), Career Bed, Submission, and This Sporting House, by pornographic film director Henri Pachard (all from 1969).

== Early life ==
Welles grew up in Paterson, New Jersey where she attended a parochial elementary school.

== Career ==
She began her career in entertainment at age 15 for a touring dance production, telling the company she was 21. She worked in a variety of areas such as a chorus line member, magician's assistant, jazz singer and nightclub performer. Later, she worked as a stripper.

In the 1960s she studied acting at The Neighborhood Playhouse. After many years of appearing in numerous R-rated films such as The Groove Tube and The Female Response, she made her first hardcore film, Honeypie, in 1975.

Welles was also a fetish magazine model for such magazines as Bizarre while using the stage name "Lisa Duran".

Welles appeared in many films, the best known being Inside Jennifer Welles (1977), which she is also credited with having directed (although the film was actually anonymously directed by sex-exploitation veteran Joseph W. Sarno).

She lectured at several schools such as the University of Maryland and Stony Brook University.

== Awards ==
Welles won the Erotica Award for Best Actress in 1977 for the film Little Orphan Sammy, and she was the editor of Eros, The Magazine of Decadent Sophistication in that same year. She became a member of the AVN Hall of Fame in 1996.

== Personal life ==
Jennifer Welles left the industry abruptly in 1977 after she married a wealthy fan. Divorcing several years later, she spent her days raising horses and rescuing dogs that had been abandoned or abused. Welles died in Arizona on June 26, 2018, at age 81.

== See also ==
- Golden Age of Porn
