= German Autumn (book) =

1947 non-fiction book about Germany in 1946, by Stig Dagerman

First edition (publ. Norstedts)

German Autumn (original title: Tysk höst) is a book published in 1947 collecting a series of journalistic essays by Swedish novelist Stig Dagerman. Written during the fall of 1946 while he was on assignment by the Swedish newspaper Expressen in Germany, it depicts life in the war-torn country in the immediate aftermath of World War II. It was not published in America until 2011 (translated by Robin Fulton Macpherson, with a foreword by Mark Kurlansky). The 2010 Swedish edition has an introduction by Nobel Prize in Literature laureate Elfriede Jelinek. It was adapted into the 2008 French documentary film 1946, automne allemand that uses archival footage from post-war Germany to illustrate Dagerman's text.

== Sources ==
- German Autumn (Tysk höst) dagerman.us
- The Suffering of the Guilty, Aaron Thier, The New Republic
- The Hard-Won Truth of the North, Colm Tóibín, The New York Review of Books
