= Malmö City Theatre =

Theatre in Malmö, Sweden

Coordinates: 55°35′47″N 12°59′47″E

- Malmö Stadsteater
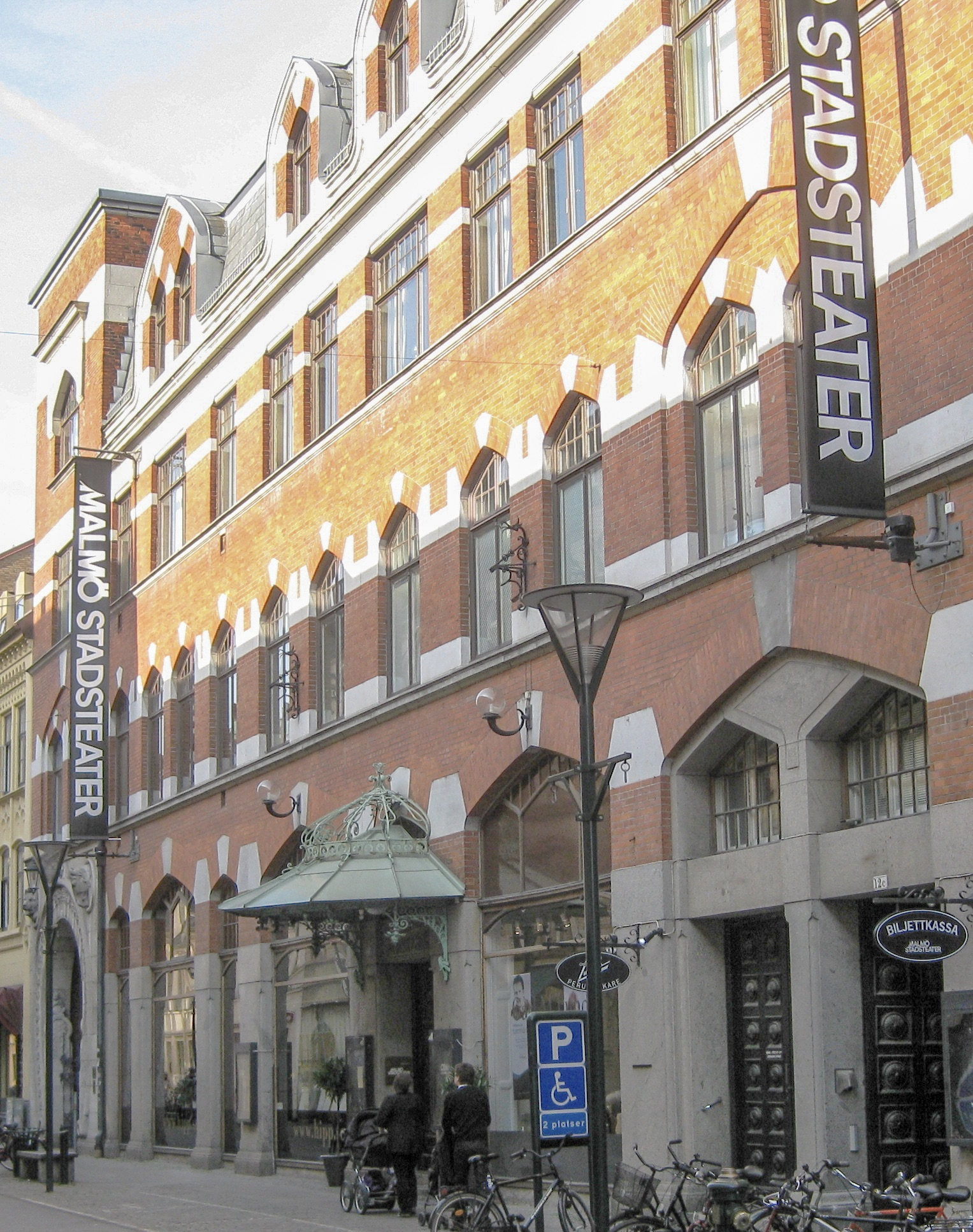
- Interactive map of Malmö City Theatre
- Former names: Malmö Dramatic Theater (1993–2008)
- Address: Sweden
- Location: Malmö, Skåne County

Construction
- Built: 1944; 82 years ago

Malmö City Theatre (Swedish: Malmö stadsteater) in Malmö, Sweden, is the main theatre of Malmö.

== History ==
The first theatre in Malmö, Malmö Teater, was built in 1808 and was in use until 1938. The Malmö City Theatre was built by the architect Sigurd Lewerentz between 1932 and 1944. From its opening in 1944 and until 1992 it was one of Sweden's leading city theatres. From the 1950s it was run by director Ingmar Bergman who staged a number of memorable and important productions with an ensemble which included popular "Bergman-actors" such as Bibi Andersson, Harriet Andersson, Gunnel Lindblom, Max von Sydow, Naima Wifstrand, Gertrud Fridh and Ingrid Thulin.

In 1992, the theatre was reorganised as Malmö Musik och Teater AB, and in 1994 split in four independent companies: Malmö Dramatiska Teater AB (Malmö Dramatic Theatre), Malmö symfoniorkester AB (Malmö Symphony Orchestra), Skånes Dansteater AB (Skåne Dance Theatre) and Malmö Musikteater AB (Malmö Music Theatre).

While the first three of the group of four moved to other performance spaces, only the Malmö Music Theatre remained in the building. By the end of the 1990s it was renamed in its present form - the Malmö Opera and Music Theatre - and the stage is nowadays used solely as an opera house.

== Notable productions ==
- The Night is the Mother of the Day, by Lars Norén, directed by Anna Takanen, 2026
