= Malmö Theatre Academy =

Swedish drama school

Coordinates: 55°35′38″N 13°0′26″E

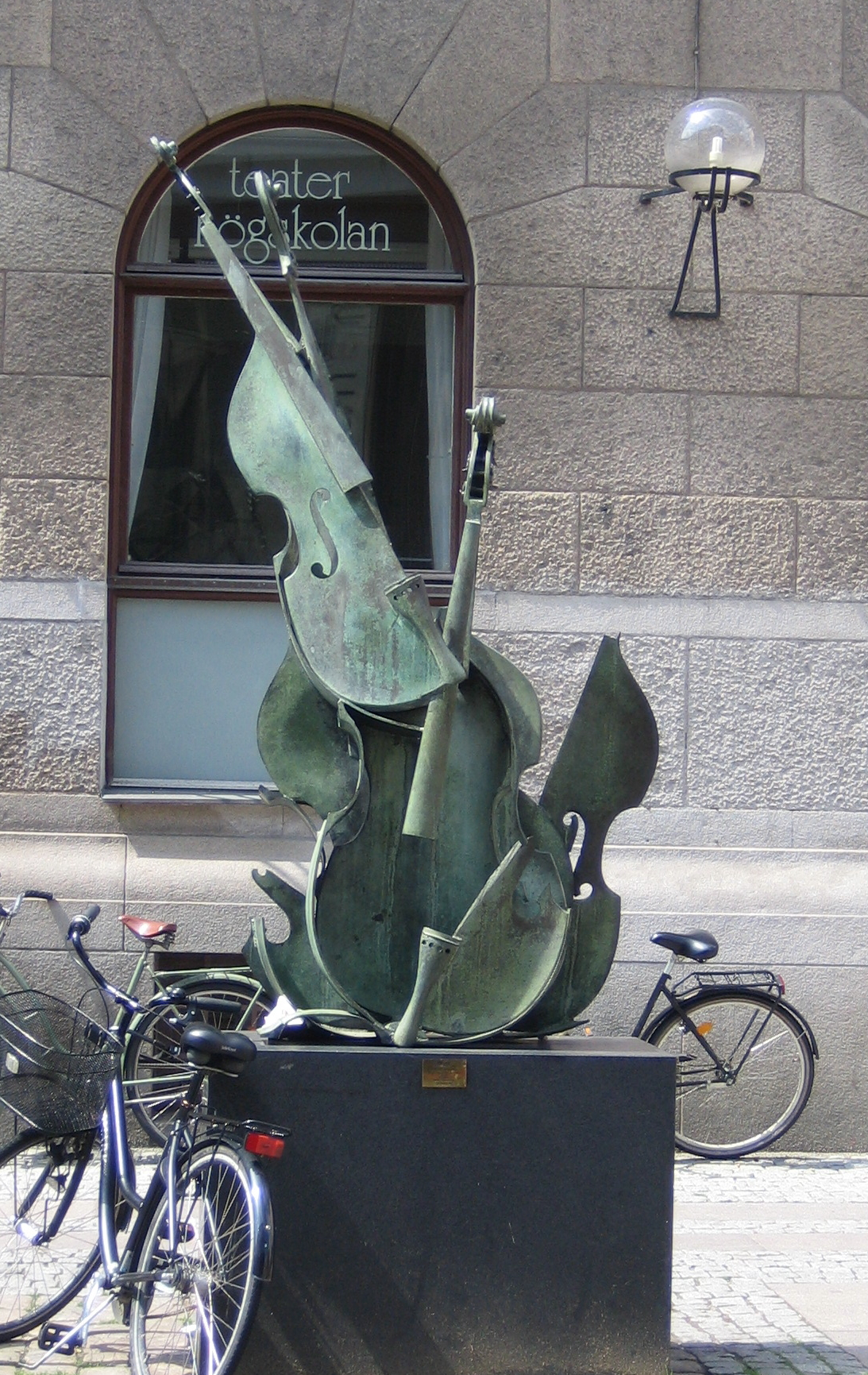
Malmö Theatre Academy

Malmö Theatre Academy (Swedish: Teaterhögskolan i Malmö) is a theatre academy at Lund University in Malmö, Sweden. The theater college educates actors, playwrights and performance artists. Over the years the school has trained over 500 actors. The academy offers Bachelor's degree, Master's degree and Doctorate degree programs as well as postgraduate education and research with artistic focus.

Malmö Theatre Academy was started at the Malmö City Theatre in 1944. Starting in 1945–46 and coherently from 1952, Swedish film and theatre director Ingmar Bergman (1918–2007) working as a director, playwright and artistic director at Malmö City Theatre. From 1953, he also became involved in the Malmö Theatre Academy.

In 1964 the school became the National Swedish School of Acting, Malmö (Swedish: Statens scenskola i Malmö) and in 1977 became a part of Lund University. Malmö Theatre Academy is housed in the Kulturhuset Mazetti cultural complex on Bergsgatan in Malmö.

The current prefect in charge of Malmö Theatre Academy is Fredrik Haller, who took over from Ditte Maria Bjerg.

== Notable former pupils ==
- Anna Takanen, actor, director and writer
