= Stig Dagerman =

Swedish writer

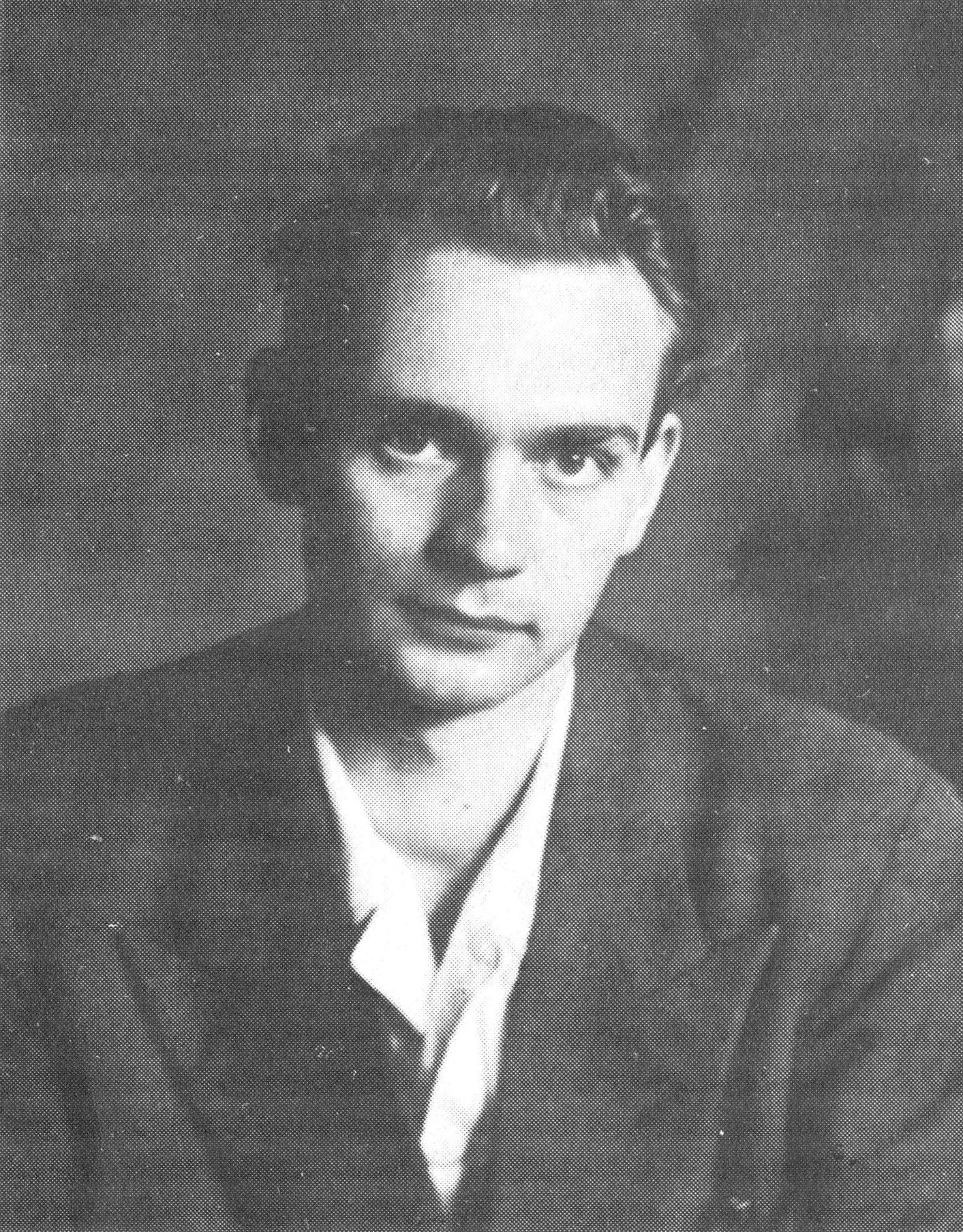
- Stig Dagerman, 1940s
- Born: Stig Halvard Andersson; 5 October 1923; Älvkarleby, Uppsala County, Sweden
- Died: 4 November 1954 (aged 31); Enebyberg, Stockholm County, Sweden
- Occupations: Writer, journalist
- Writing career
- Language: Swedish
- Years active: 1945–1954

Stig Halvard Dagerman (5 October 1923 – 4 November 1954) was a Swedish author and journalist prominent in the aftermath of World War II.

== Biography ==
Stig Dagerman was born Stig Halvard Andersson in Älvkarleby, Uppsala County. He later took his father's surname Jansson and then changed his name to Stig Dagerman in his teens. In the course of five years, 1945–49, he enjoyed success with four novels, a collection of short stories, a book about postwar Germany, five plays, hundreds of poems and satirical verses, several essays of note and a large amount of journalism.

In 1953-54 he was married to actress Anita Björk.

After the 1953 divorce from his first wife, battling deepening depression, he committed suicide in 1954, having shut the doors of the garage and run the engine.

== Literary style and themes ==
Dagerman is representative of the Swedish literary movement fyrtiotalism. His works deal with universal problems of morality and conscience, of sexuality and social philosophy, of love, compassion, justice, fear, guilt, and loneliness. Despite the somber content, he also displays a wry sense of humor that occasionally turns his writing into burlesque or satire.

== Legacy ==
The annual Stig Dagerman Prize awards individuals who, like Dagerman, promote empathy and understanding through their work.

In 2023, the centenary of Stig Dagerman's birth was celebrated in Sweden with various events and staging of plays. In Stig Dagerman's native Älvkarleby a park was named after Dagerman and a statue of him was placed there.

== Main works ==
- Ormen (The Snake) 1945, novel
- De dömdas ö (Island of the Doomed) 1946, novel
- Tysk höst (German Autumn), 1947, non-fictional account of post-war Germany
- Nattens lekar (The Games of Night) 1947, a collection of short stories
- Bränt barn (A Burnt Child, also translated as A Moth To a Flame) 1948, novel
- Dramer om dömda: Den dödsdömde; Skuggan av Mart (Dramas of the Condemned: The Man Condemned to Death; Marty's Shadow) 1948, plays
- Judas Dramer: Streber; Ingen går fri (Judas Dramas: No One Goes Free; The Climber) 1949, plays
- Bröllopsbesvär (Wedding Worries) 1949, novel
- Vårt behov av tröst (Our Need for Consolation is Insatiable) 1955, prose and poetry. Edited by O. Lagercrantz

== English translations ==
=== Books ===
- German Autumn. Translation by Robin Fulton. Introduction by Mark Kurlansky. University of Minnesota Press, 2011.
- Sleet: Selected Stories. Translation by Steven Hartman. Preface by Alice McDermott. David R. Godine, 2013.
- A Burnt Child. Translation by Benjamin Mier-Cruz. Introduction by Per Olov Enquist. University of Minnesota Press, 2013.
- Island of the Doomed. Translation by Laurie Thompson. Introduction by JMG Le Clezio. University of Minnesota Press, 2012.
- The Snake. Translation and introduction by Laurie Thompson. Quartet Encounters, London, 1995.
- The Games of Night. Translation by Naomi Walford and introduction by Michael Meyer. Bodley Head, London, 1959; Lippincott, Philadelphia and New York, 1961; Quartet Encounters, London, 1986.
- A Moth to a Flame. Translation by Benjamin Miers-Cruz. Introduction by Siri Hustvedt. Penguin European Writers 2019.

=== Individual texts translated by Steven Hartman ===
- "Our Need for Consolation." "Little Star", Issue 5, 2014. 301-307
- "Thousand Years with God." (unpublished)
- "The Surprise." Southern California Anthology 8, Los Angeles, CA: University of Southern California, 1996. 60-66
- "Men of Character." Southern Review 32:1. Baton Rouge, LA: Louisiana State University, 1996. 59-79
- "Salted Meat and Cucumber." Prism International 34:2. Vancouver, BC: University of British Columbia, 1996. 54-60
- "Sleet." Confrontation 54/55 (Double Issue). New York, NY: Long Island University, 1994. 53-62
- "The Games of Night." Black Warrior Review 20:2. Tuscaloosa, AL: University of Alabama, 1994. 107-117
- "In Grandmother's House." Quarterly West 38. Salt Lake City, UT: University of Utah, 1994. 160-167
- "To Kill A Child." Grand Street 42. New York, NY, 1992. 96-100

==== Other English translations ====
- "Marty's Shadow." Translation of the play "Skuggan av Mart" by Lo Dagerman and Nancy Pick, 2017.
- "Pithy Poems." Translation by Laurie Thompson. The Lampeter Translation Series: 4. Lampeter, Wales, 1989.
- "God Pays a Visit to Newton, 1727." Translation by Ulla Natterqvist-Sawa. Prism International, Vancouver, BC, October 1986, 7-24.
- "Bon Soir." Translation by Anne Born. The Swedish Book Review supplement, UK, 1984, 13-.
- "The Man Condemned to Death." Translation by Joan Tate. The Swedish Book Review supplement, UK, 1984, 21-.
- " The Condemned." Translation by Henry Alexander and Llewellyn Jones. Scandinavian Plays of the Twentieth Century, Third Series, Princeton, NJ: Princeton University Press, 1951.

=== Selected adaptations ===
- "To Kill A Child" (TRT 10 min, 2003, Swedish with English subtitles) by Bjorne Larson and Alexander Skarsgard. Narration by Stellan Skarsgard.
- "The Games of Night" (TRT 23 min, 2007, English) by Dan Levy Dagerman. Screenplay based on translation by Steven Hartman.
- "Our Need for Consolation" (TRT 20 min, 2012, English) by Dan Levy Dagerman. Narration by Stellan Skarsgard.
- "Notre besoin de consolation est impossible a rassasier," Têtes raides, CD "Banco," 2007. "Corps de mots," CD booklet + DVD, 2013.
- "Stig Dagerman," a French poem inspired from "Our need for consolation is insatiable", written by Kentin Jivek, part of the album "Now I'm Black Moon", released in April 2011.
