= Knäppupp =

Swedish entertainment series

Knäppupp (Swedish: "unbutton") was the collective name of a popular revue series produced by Swedish musician and entertainer Povel Ramel. It was associated with Knäppupp AB, the production company that was set up specifically for the purpose of managing and financing the theatrical performances. The company was active from 1952 to 1968. Ramel was the driving force behind the revues and wrote and performed most of the material himself. Among the more prolific co-actors were Martin Ljung and Brita Borg.

== History ==
Povel Ramel and Per-Martin Hamberg had worked in the Swedish Radio entertainment department, where Ramel made innovative radio programs such as The Hunt for Johan Blöth, The Association for the Promotion of Flying, Four Around a Grand Piano and Mr. Hålm's Fates and Adventures, in which Brita Borg and Martin Ljung participated. When the swaying artist and entertainment producer Felix Alvo came up with a proposal for a collaboration, the result was the production Akta huvet at Cirkus in Gothenburg in 1952, where the ensemble was expanded to include Maj-Britt Thörn, Gunwer Bergqvist and Oscar Rundqvist, among others. "Anything except revue", said Ramel, giving the phenomenon the name Knäppupp. In 1953, Alvo and Ramel took over the Odeon Theatre at Brunkebergstorg in Stockholm, which was renamed Idéonteatern. This was followed by annual productions, which were usually performed from the autumn at Idéon and in circus tents Sweden around the following summer, until 1968, when the theatre was demolished to build the Culture House. Ramel was then ready for activities in another form, PoW Show with Wenche Myhre and performances with Sven Olson's trio.

Typical for Knäppupp were unconventional approaches inspired by American crazy humor, elastic game openings, where sleepwalkers, chimney sweeps, polar explorers and doctors joked with the audience already at the entrance, crazy whims such as Ramel's entrance via a tense wire from the other side of the circus room and an artificial rain in the finale "Follow me out in the rain". Particular inspiration came from the stage version (original) of the film Hellzapoppin which Ramel had previously experienced at the London Palladium After the first few years, the humour and sketches became more conventional, but many are the song and sketch classics that originate from Ramel and Knäppupp: "The Old Restaurant Trio", "Nature Children", "Ester", "Siskorna i björken", "Fat Mammy Brown", "Fingal Olsson" and so on All 4 (1960) appointed Povel, Gunwer, Martin, Brita as a kind of core troupe, while Dax again (1962) was a large and ambitious anniversary pop with new wild crazy grips. The four reunited in Karamellodier på Berns (1972) and in Knäpp igen (1992), which was an anniversary production with modern artists and Wenche plus Brita, Gunwer and Martin as alternating guest artists.

For a few years, Knäppupp was probably the definition of Swedish humor and good musical entertainment. The company was a giant in Swedish entertainment that produced theatre as well as films and gramophone records with all kinds of artists, not just Knäppupps. Ideon also featured Karl Gerhard revues, operettas with Nils Poppe, guest performances by Denmark's revue king Stig Lommer and American musicals. Ramel wrote most of it himself, but also got help from Martin Ljung, Yngve Gamlin, Hasse Ekman, Hasseåtage, Beppe Wolgers and many more to keep the tent and the theater well filled. Later entertainment producers such as Svenska Ord avoided tying themselves as tightly to one and the same theatre and institutionalised forms of touring.

The Knäppupptent, at least parts of it, lived on when it was rented out to the socialist theatre tour Tältprojektet, which travelled around Sweden in a similar way but with different intentions in the summer of 1977.

== Productions ==
Date	Name	Translation	Notes
1952	Knäppupp 1: Akta huvet	Watch Out Your Head / Mind Your Head	The name was because Povel came in a cable way over the crowd in Circus in Gothenburg, and he screamed: "Watch Out! Here comes Grandfather!"
1953	Djuprevyn: 2 Neter	The Deep-Vaudeville, 2 Metre	
1954	Knäppupp 2: Denna sida upp	This Side Up	
1956	Knäppupp 3: Tillstymmelser	Suggestions	
1958	Funny Boy		
1961	Alla 4	All 4	The summer-version was called Semestersångarna (The Vacation Singers)
1962	Dax igen	It's Time Again	
1964	Ryck mej i snöret	Pull Me in the String	
1965	Ta av dej skorna	Take Off Your Shoes	
1966	På avigan	The Wrong Way Around	
1968	De sista entusiasterna	The Last Enthusiasts	

== Films ==
Date	Name	Notes
1954	I rök och dans	
1956	Ratataa/The Staffan Stolle Story	
1957	Far till sol och vår	
1958	Den store amatören	
1959	Sköna Susanna och gubbarna	This film was not successful, playing at 1 cinema for a week.

== Discography ==
=== 78-rpm ===
- Knäppupp på Svensk entertainment musik, revues och film 1900–1960

=== LPs ===
- KLP series
- SPO Series
- KNLP Series

=== EPs and singles ===
- KNEP series
- KNEP 1000 Series
- 4500 Series
- D-Series
- KN Series
