= Lars Passgård =

Swedish actor

- Born: 14 February 1941; Borås, Sweden
- Died: 16 March 2003 (aged 62); Malmö, Sweden
- Occupation: Actor
- Years active: 1961–2002

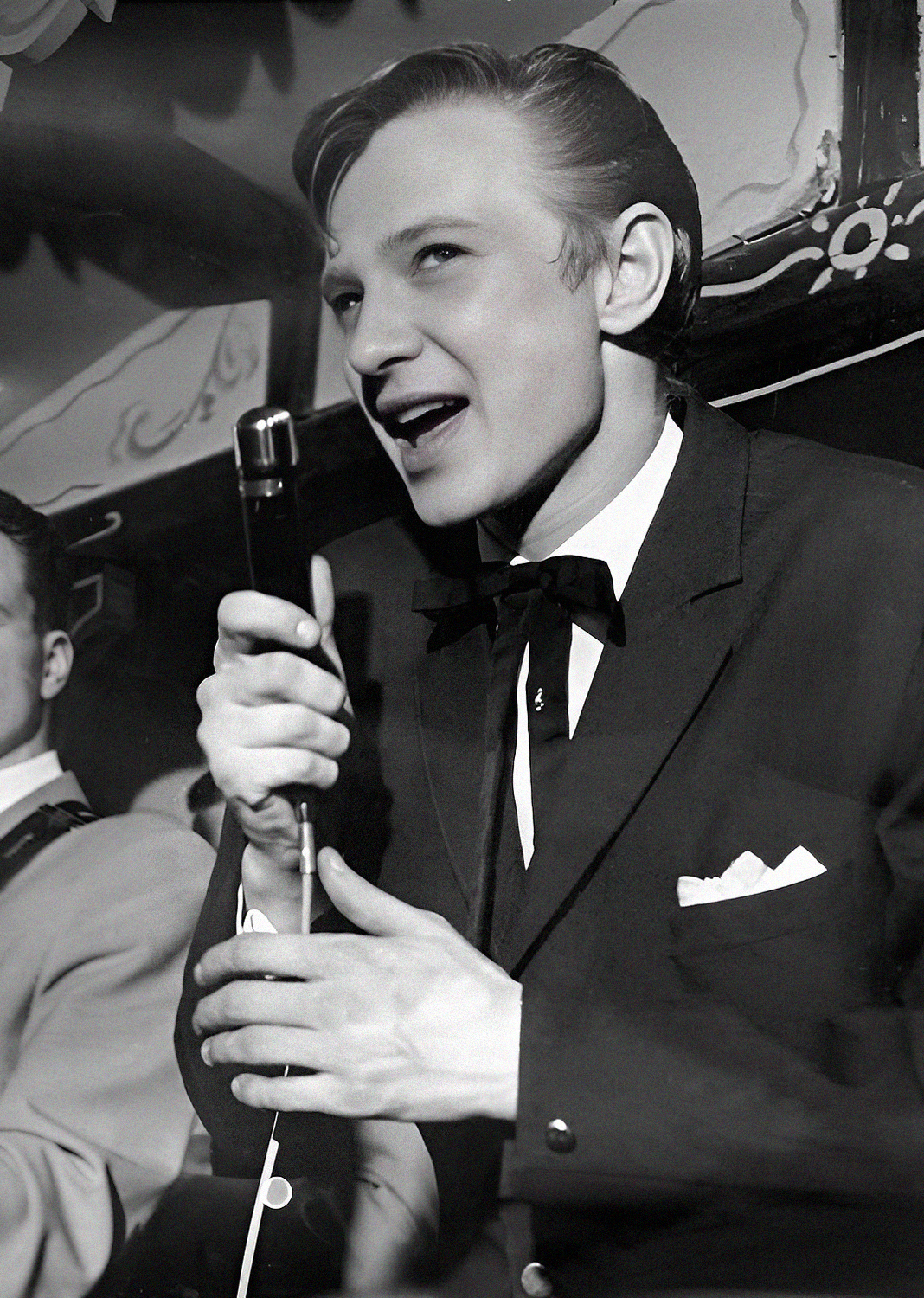
Lars Passgår sings Let's Twist Again in the filmen Barnvagnen from 1963.

Lars Passgård (14 February 1941 – 16 March 2003) was a Swedish actor and theatre director. He appeared in more than 30 films and television shows between 1961 and 2002.

== Biography ==
=== Early life and education ===
Passgård grew up in Smålandsstenar, a locality in Jönköping County. He acted in amateur theater in Smålandsstenar and, in 1959, began training at the Malmö City Theatre, which is now designated as the Malmö Theatre Academy and is a part of Lund University.

=== Career ===
After completing his studies, Malmö City Theatre became his main stage. Although, he also made guest appearances on theater stages in both Sweden and Denmark. In 1961, he made his theater debut in Malmö and his film debut in Ingmar Bergman's Through a Glass Darkly, which, in part, won him roles in Bo Widerberg's 1963 feature debut Barnvagnen and the 1963 Hollywood film The Prize. Passgård later acted in Yngve Gamlin's 1965 film The Chasers, which won the Silver Bear Extraordinary Jury Prize at the 16th Berlin International Film Festival in 1966.

In 1961, his popularity grew and he became a teen idol for his participation in the TV entertainment series Bialitt. Between 1963 and 1966, Passgård was part of the TV-theater ensemble on SVT and played at various private theaters in Stockholm, including the Stockholm City Theatre from 1965 to 1966 and 1970 to 1971, and the Royal Dramatic Theatre between 1971 and 1973. He also played at the Royal Danish Theatre in Copenhagen and received much attention for his performance of Prince Hamlet in William Shakespeare's Hamlet in Aalborg in 1969. After his time spent at the Royal Danish Theatre, he returned to Malmö, where he was the theater's drama director between 1986 and 1989.

In 1962 he received the Swedish Union for Theatre, Artists and Media's Daniel Engdahl scholarship, and in 1985 he received Kvällsposten's Thalia Prize.

=== Death and legacy ===
Passgård died in on 16 March 2003 in Malmö after a brief illness. He was interred in Limhamn at the cemetery of Limhamn Church.

Following his death, Lars' mother Elvy Passgård instituted a theater scholarship, dedicated to his memory, to be shared out among theater students at the Malmö Theatre Academy of Lund University. The total fund allocates 1,000,000 Swedish kronor to manage. The scholarship holder must be "young and promising, talented and focused on the nature of the spectacle of dramatic or comic art".

== Filmography ==
=== Film ===
| Year | Title | Role | Notes |
|---|---|---|---|
| 1961 | Through a Glass Darkly | Minus | |
| 1962 | Dagboken - scener ur tre böcker | | Short film |
| 1963 | Barnvagnen | Robban | |
| 1963 | Någon av er | | TV movie |
| 1963 | The Prize | Swedish Man | Uncredited |
| 1963 | Hittebarnet | Bälin | TV movie |
| 1964 | Kärlek utan strumpor | Mats | TV movie |
| 1964 | Swedish Wedding Night | Martin | |
| 1964 | Henrik IV | Prince Johan | TV movie |
| 1964 | Ta hand om Amelie | Etienne | TV movie |
| 1965 | Blodsbröllop | Bridegroom | TV movie |
| 1965 | Nattcafé | Sune | TV movie |
| 1965 | The Chasers | Desperado | |
| 1965 | Idolen | Kennet | TV movie |
| 1965 | Gustav Vasa | Reginald | TV movie |
| 1965 | Bödeln | | TV movie |
| 1965 | Aftonstjärnan | Ingenjörn | TV movie |
| 1965 | Hans nåds testamente | Roger Hyltenius | TV movie |
| 1966 | Doktor Knock | Scipio | TV movie |
| 1966 | Woyzeck | Andres | TV movie |
| 1966 | Ormen | Gideon | |
| 1966 | Kvinnas man | | TV movie |
| 1966 | Patrasket | Felix | TV movie |
| 1966 | Den ödesdigra klockan | Sven Bertil Kjellman | |
| 1966 | The Princess | Gunnar | |
| 1967 | Candida | Marchbanks | TV movie |
| 1967 | Etienne | Etienne | TV movie |
| 1968 | The Fuller Report | Knut | |
| 1968 | Romeo, Julia och mörkret | Pavel | TV movie |
| 1969 | Förhinder | The Piano Player | Short film |
| 1971 | Ferien | Bertil | TV movie |
| 1974 | Erik XIV | Erik XIV | TV movie |
| 1998 | Vasasagan | Hemming Gad / monk / Stenbock / Svante Sture / General Wrangel | TV movie |

=== Television ===
| Year | Title | Role | Notes |
|---|---|---|---|
| 1963 | Route 66 | Eric | Episode: "A Gift for a Warrior" |
| 1966 | Nidingen | | |
| 1967 | Drottningens juvelsmycke | Emanuel | 2 episodes |
| 1991 | Ålder okänd | Skådespelaren | 3 episodes |
| 1999 | Offer och gärningsmän | Sandvikaren | Episode: "Offer och gärningsmän" |
| 2000 | Labyrinten | Rättsläkare | 3 episodes |
| 2000 | Soldater i månsken | Hall | 4 episodes |
| 2002 | Den 5:e kvinnan | Hundägaren | 4 episodes, (final appearance) |

== Theatre ==
=== Roles (not complete) ===
| Year | Role | Production | Direction | Theatre |
|---|---|---|---|---|
| 1960/61 | | Midsommardröm i fattighuset | | Malmö City Theatre |
| 1960/61 | | Drottningens juvelsmycke Carl Jonas Love Almqvist | | Malmö City Theatre |
| 1961/62 | | Drömresan | | Malmö City Theatre |
| 1961/62 | | Världsomseglaren | | Malmö City Theatre |
| 1961/62 | | Mäster Olof; August Strindberg | | Malmö City Theatre |
| 1961/62 | | Spöket på Canterville; Oscar Wilde | | Malmö City Theatre |
| 1961/62 | | Primadonna | | Malmö City Theatre |
| 1962/63 | | Min kära är en ros | | Malmö City Theatre |
| 1962/63 | | Stackars pappa, mamma har hängt dig i garderoben och jag känner mig så nere | | Malmö City Theatre |
| 1962/63 | | Gudomligt fusk | | Malmö City Theatre |
| 1968/69 | | Det tysta vapnet | | Malmö City Theatre |
| 1971 | Valère | Tartuffe; Molière | Mimi Pollak | Royal Dramatic Theatre |
| 1974/75 | | Fem minuter att leva | | Malmö City Theatre |
| 1975/76 | | Arsenik och gamla spetsar | | Malmö City Theatre |
| 1976/77 | | The Sunshine Boys; Neil Simon | | Malmö City Theatre |
| 1976/77 | | Fröken Rosita (Blommornas språk) | | Malmö City Theatre |
| 1977/78 | | Chez Nous | | Malmö City Theatre |
| 1978/79 | | Harvey | | Malmö City Theatre |
| 1978/79 | | Det är väl mitt liv? | | Malmö City Theatre |
| 1980/81 | | Bosman och Lena | | Malmö City Theatre |
| 1980/81 | | Stängda dörrar | | Malmö City Theatre |
| 1981/82 | | Fadern; August Strindberg | | Malmö City Theatre |
| 1981/82 | | Blodsbröllop; Federico García Lorca | | Malmö City Theatre |
| 1981/82 | | Matiné med lyrik | | Malmö City Theatre |
| 1982/83 | | Från regnormarnas liv Per Olov Enquist | | Malmö City Theatre |
| 1983/84 | | Doktorn klipper till | | Malmö City Theatre |
| 1983/84 | | Har ni sett Butlern? | | Malmö City Theatre |
| 1984/85 | | Det var en lördag afton | | Malmö City Theatre |
| 1986/87 | | Jaktscener från Nedre Bayern | | Malmö City Theatre |
| 1988/89 | | I gycklarnas tid | | Malmö City Theatre |
| 1989/90 | | Slaget vid Lepanto | | Malmö City Theatre |
| 1989/90 | | Lulu | | Malmö City Theatre |
| 1990/91 | | Ett dårhus i Goa | | Malmö City Theatre |
| 1991/92 | | Repetitionen eller Den straffade kärleken | | Malmö City Theatre |
| 1992/93 | | Volpone | | Malmö City Theatre |
| 1993/94 | | Mamma, pappa, barn: det familjära våldets historia | | Malmö City Theatre |
| 1993/94 | | Schroffenstein | | Malmö City Theatre |
| 1994/95 | | Lulu | | Malmö City Theatre |
| 1994/95 | | Jekyll och Hyde | | Malmö City Theatre |
| 1994/95 | | Förväxlingar; William Shakespeare | | Malmö City Theatre |
| 1995/96 | | Paradisets barn | | Malmö City Theatre |
| 1995/96 | | Blod | | Malmö City Theatre |
| 1996/97 | | Magisk cirkel Per Olov Enquist | | Malmö City Theatre |
| 1996/97 | | Den kaukasiska kritcirkeln Bertolt Brecht | | Malmö City Theatre |
| 1997/98 | | Vasasagan; August Strindberg | | Malmö City Theatre |
