= Tuven =

Tuven is a surname. Notable people with the surname include:

- Betty Tuvén (1928–1999), Swedish actress
- Janne Tuven (born 1975), Norwegian handball player
