= Naked Hearts =

Naked Hearts may refer to:

- Naked Hearts (1966 film), a French drama film
- Naked Hearts (1916 film), an American silent drama film

== See also ==
- The Naked Heart, a 1950 British-French historical drama film
- Naked Heart Festival, an annual book festival at Glad Day Bookshop in Toronto, Canada
- Naked Heart Foundation, a charity based in Russia for children with special needs
