= Brita Borg =

Swedish singer and actress

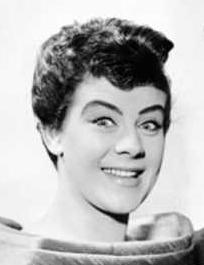
- Born: Brita Kerstin Gunvor Borg; 10 June 1926; Stockholm, Sweden
- Died: 4 May 2010 (aged 83); Borgholm, Sweden
- Occupation: Actress/singer
- Years active: 1935–92

Brita Kerstin Gunvor Borg (10 June 1926 – 4 May 2010) was a Swedish singer, actress, and variety show artist. Her variety show career spanned from 1943 into the 1970s, while her singing career trailed away at the end of the 1960s. However, she was still an active actress in the 1980s. Borg represented Sweden in the Eurovision Song Contest 1959 in Cannes.

== Biography ==
Borg was born on Södermalm in Stockholm and began her career in the Södermalm-based variety show group Vårat gäng ("Our Gang") after having won a song competition organised by the magazine Vecko-Revyn in 1943. In 1945, she formed the quartet Flickery Flies with Allan Johansson, whom she later married. In 1947, she began her long collaboration with famous Swedish variety performer and writer Povel Ramel. She participated in his radio program Fyra kring en flygel ("Four around a grand piano") and was the prima donna of several versions of the Knäppupp variety show between 1952 and 1962.

Amongst her most famous numbers were Fat Mammy Brown, where she played an African-American jazz/gospel singer in blackface and fat padding, the tango Banne mej from the variety musical Funny Boy, where she played the seductive Gypsy girl Zamora, and Ulliga krulliga gubbar, a satirical Dixieland ballad about the fashionableness of beards. When the prolific comedy duo Hans Alfredson and Tage Danielsson were writing for Knäppupp they provided her with songs such as Alla kan ju inte älska alla här i världen ("Everyone can't love everyone"), Aldrig har jag sett en rak banana ("I've Never Seen a Straight Banana"), and Du är min tekopp ("You are my teacup"). In 1962, she reached the peak of her career as a variety show artist with the number Die Borg, parodying Swedish singers who made a career by catering to German audiences.

From 1964 onwards Borg performed in several variety shows with Hagge Geigert in Uddevalla and Gothenburg, and a sojourn at Folkan with Kar de Mumma. In the 1970s, she moved to Arvidsjaur with her new husband, policeman Stig Salomonsson, and thereafter was most active as an actress, most often for the National Swedish Touring Theatre. She played in the musical Call Me Madam in 1967, and gave a celebrated performance as Annie Oakley in the musical Annie Get Your Gun in 1973. Henceforth she toured with the National Swedish Touring Theatre in performances of Christina Alexandra, Fiddler on the Roof, Ramel riket runt, and The Threepenny Opera. Among her more important dramatic performances was her turn alongside Halvar Björk in Richard Hobert's televised play Polskan och puckelryggen from 1983.

== Singing career ==
In the 1950s, Borg was a Swedish pop-queen. She made many recordings, first for Sonora, then for Knäppupp. In 1959, it was decided that whichever song won in the Melodifestivalen she would travel to sing in the final of the Eurovision Song Contest 1959 in Cannes. In the final she reached a respectable 9th place. It was Augustin. In 1960, she performed as Hasse Alfredson's duet-partner in the comic Oj då kära nån and Märta Melin och Ture Tyrén and was awarded the honour of singing a duet with Evert Taube in two recordings of Invitation till Guatemala and Mary Strand. In 1961, an LP recording was made where she interpreted Århundradets melodier ("The tunes of the century"), including Hässelbysteppen, Min soldat and Sjösala vals. Her genre was traditional pop songs, with the, at the time, common leaning towards Italian (La strada dell'amore, Ciao ciao Bambina). She had attempted a more modern style with Frankenstein rock in 1957 but was eventually surpassed by younger, but less voice-strong singers, with greater appeal to a young audience. Stig Anderson, Björn Ulvaeus, and Benny Andersson gave her a final hit with the song Ljuva sextiotal, which stayed in the Swedish charts (Svensktoppen) for 20 weeks in 1969.

== Acting career ==
Borg was musical, humorous, and conscientious, but ended up becoming an actress instead of a pop star. She did not make a major comeback similar to the comebacks by several other older Swedish pop stars such as Hanson, Carson, and Malmkvist, or had her pop song recordings re-released in anthologies and CDs, like Leander and Lindblom have. She has barely even become camp or a gay icon, as Git Gay, maybe because she, as a variety show prima donna, had been self-ironic from the beginning. The self-ironic undertones remained when Vårat gäng made a comeback in the 1980s and she was able to present herself as "En något överårig tonårsidol" (" A teen idol somewhat past her prime"), and in the anniversary Knäppup show Knäpp igen in 1992, when she sang Vi sätter P för primadonnan ("We stop the show for the prima donna").

== Death ==
Borg died on 4 May 2010 at the age of 83 in Borgholm.

== Other songs ==
- "Tangerine" (1943)
- "Alla säger att jag ser så ledsen ut" (first Ramel-song 1947)
- "Jag ska ta morfar med mig ut i kväll" (a big hit in 1948)
- "Sodom och Gomorra"
- "Calypso Italiano" (1957)
- "Kärlek livet ut" (1957)
- "Sorglösa brunn" (duet with Ramel)
- "Ge en fräknig och ful liten flicka en chans"
- "Regn, regn, regn" (on EP-record "Brita i regnet")
- "Utsikt från en bro" (lyrics by Karl Gerhard about a waiting sailor's wife)
- "Gotländsk sommarnatt"
- "Frysboxcalypso" (advertisement for Elektro-Helios on a rare EP with Alfredson)
- "Res med mig till Skottland!"
- "Ett rent undantag" (a small, comedic variety show song which to Ramel's disappointment didn't become a hit)
- "Jan Öivind Swahn"
- "Die Borg" (from the Knäppupp show Dax igen)

== Filmography ==
- Rymdinvasion i Lappland (1959)
- The Great Amateur (1958)
- Dance in the Smoke (1954)
- I dur och skur (1953)
- Hidden in the Fog (1953)
- Dårskapens hus (1951)
- Med flyg till sjunde himlen (1949)
- The Street (1949)
- Lilla Märta kommer tillbaka (1948)
- Swing it, magistern! (1940) (uncredited)

Awards and achievements
Preceded by Alice Babs with "Lilla stjärna"	Sweden in the Eurovision Song Contest; 1959	Succeeded by Siw Malmkvist with "Alla andra får varann"
