= Lotta Ramel =

Swedish actress and director

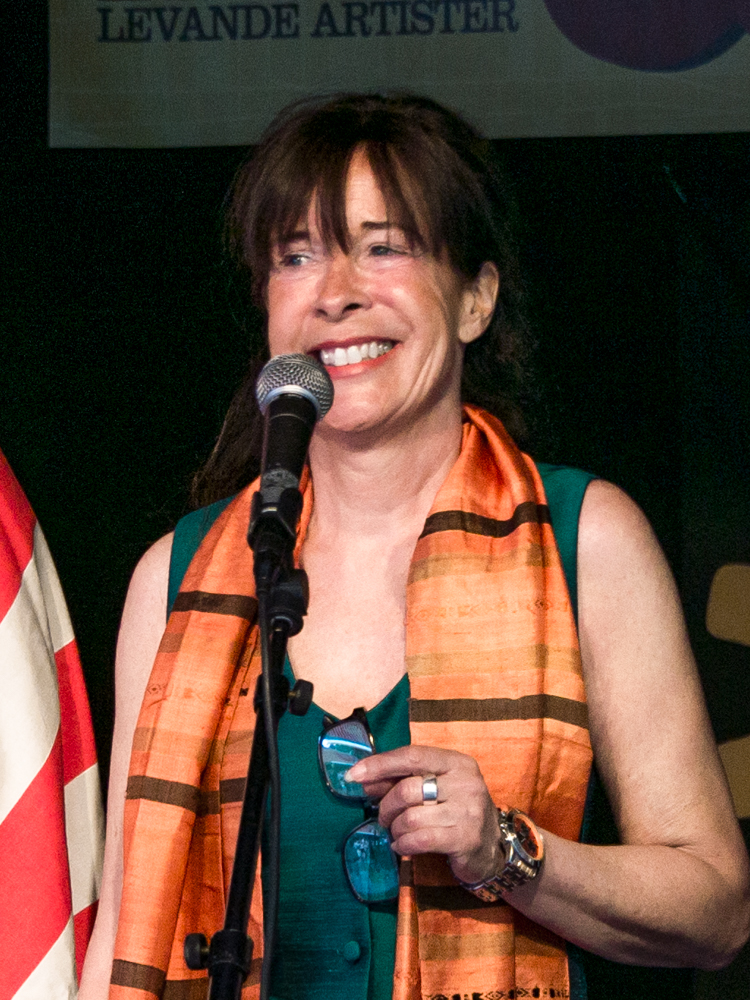
- Ramel in 2017
- Born: Charlotte Ramel; 29 September 1957 (age 68); Lidingö, Sweden
- Occupations: Actress, director
- Spouse: Ted Gärdestad (m. 1976–1978)
- Partner(s): Johan H:son Kjellgren; Ola Fuchs
- Children: Jim Ramel Kjellgren; Lycke Fuchs Ramel
- Relatives: Povel Ramel (father); Susanna Ramel (mother); Mikael Ramel (brother)

Charlotte Ramel (born 29 September 1957) is a Swedish actress and director. She has been active in both films and theater, acting in TV series like Rederiet, and films like Falsk som vatten.

== Biography ==
Lotta Ramel studied at Teaterhögskolan in Malmö between 1977 and 1980, her classmates included Johan Ulveson and Lars-Göran Persson. She has acted in several films, such as Hans Alfredson's Falsk som vatten (1985) and television series like Rederiet (1995) which was broadcast on SVT. She has worked at several theaters like Malmö City Theatre (1980), Norrbottensteatern in Luleå (1981–1985). Since 1985, she has been working at the Stockholm City Theatre. Lotta Ramel has also been working at Tyrolen and Teater Tribunalen. She directed the play En strut karameller på Vasateatern in 2008, and the play Kolla Povel about her father Povel Ramel in 2009.

In 2010, Lotta Ramel and her brother Mikael Ramel along with Backa Hans Eriksson toured with the play Povels Naturbarn. She also works as a teacher in acting at Södra Latin in Stockholm. In 2014, Ramel directed the play Det är synd om papporna with the theater company Unga Giljotin.

In 2009, Ramel took part in an episode of the SVT show Who do You Think You Are? In the 2018 film Ted: För kärlekens skull about the work and life of Ted Gärdestad, Ramel is played by actress Happy Jankell. In the same film, she plays her own mother Susanna Ramel.

== Personal life ==
She is the daughter of the entertainer Povel Ramel and the actress Susanna Ramel, and the sister of the singer Mikael Ramel, and the half-sister of Marianne Gillgren and Carina Gillgren.

Between 1976 and 1978, she was married to singer Ted Gärdestad. Along with Johan H:son Kjellgren she has a son, Jim Ramel Kjellgren, and with Ola Fuchs she has a daughter, Lycke Fuchs Ramel.

In 2017, Ramel supported the Me Too movement in Sweden.

== Filmography ==
- 2018 – Ted: För kärlekens skull
- 2004 – Kyrkogårdsön
- 1995 – Rederiet
- 1989 – La strada del amore
- 1987 – I dag röd
- 1986 – Affären Ramel
- 1985 – Falsk som vatten
- 1978 – Bevisbördan (TV-series)
- 1977 – Semlons gröna dalar
- 1977 – Jack
- 1975 – Långtradarchaufförens berättelser (TV-series)
