= Susanna Ramel =

Swedish actress (1920–2020)

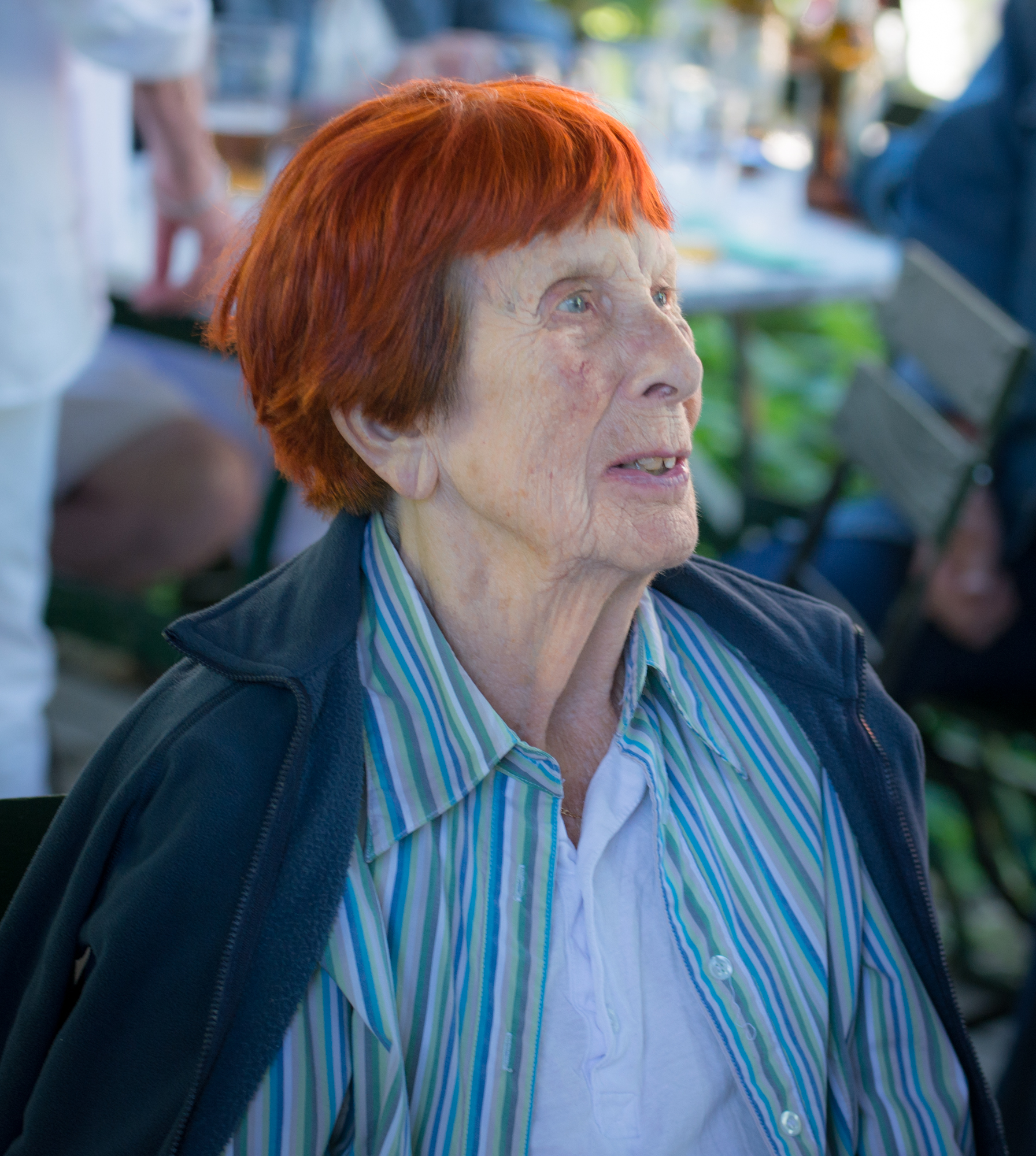
- Susanna Ramel in 2018
- Born: Susanna Ragnarsdotter Östberg; 1 April 1920; Stockholm, Sweden
- Died: 4 April 2020 (aged 100); Stockholm, Sweden
- Occupation: Actress
- Spouses: Sven Arne Gillgren (m. 1941; div. 1949) Povel Ramel (m. 1949; died 2007)
- Children: Carina Gillgren (1943); Marianne Gillgren (1945); Mikael Ramel (1949); Charlotte "Lotta" Ramel (1957)
- Relatives: Ragnar Östberg (father); Carin Thiel (mother); Ernest Thiel (grandfather)

Baroness Susanna Ragnarsdotter Ramel (née Östberg; previously Gillgren; 1 April 1920 – 4 April 2020) was a Swedish dancer, singer, actress, and movement therapist. Ramel was the daughter of the architect Ragnar Östberg and Carin Thiel; her maternal grandfather was the financier and art collector Ernest Thiel.

== Biography ==
She was born as Susanna Ragnarsdotter Östberg on April 1, 1920 in Stockholm to Ragnar Östberg and Carin Thiel. Both her parents had been married before and had divorced their spouses. She had six older half-sisters, three on her father's side (Gunvor Östberg, Hervor Östberg and Elsvor Östberg) and three on her mother's side (Ulla Lidman-Frostenson, Ann-Marie Lidman and Karin Olga Elisabeth Lidman).

She started studying ballet as a young girl, and she appeared as a dancer in several Swedish films in the 1930s and 1940s, as well as in variety shows and revues.

She was married twice; first in 1941 to Sven Arne Gillgren with whom she had two daughters, Carina (born 1943) and Marianne (born 1945). They divorced in 1949, and in the same year she married Povel Ramel, who had first noticed her when she was a dancer at Södra Teatern. The couple had two children: Mikael (born 19 January 1949) and Charlotte (Lotta), (born 29 September 1957). In the 2018 film Ted: För kärlekens skull, Lotta Ramel plays the role of Susanna.

Ramel turned 100 on 1 April 2020, and died three days later.

== Filmography ==
- 1939 – Skanör-Falsterbo
- 1939 – Kadettkamrater
- 1940 – Blyge Anton
- 1941 – Den ljusnande framtid
- 1942 – Livet på en pinne
- 1986 – Affären Ramel (TV-series)
