= Dance in the Smoke =

1954 film

- Directed by: Bengt Blomgren; Yngve Gamlin
- Written by: Yngve Gamlin; Sten Kärrby; Povel Ramel
- Starring: Martin Ljung; Annalisa Ericson; Stig Järrel
- Cinematography: Martin Bodin
- Edited by: Oscar Rosander
- Music by: Povel Ramel; Charles Redland; Lille Bror Söderlundh
- Production company: Knäppupp
- Distributed by: Fribergs Filmbyrå
- Release date: 30 July 1954
- Running time: 102 minutes
- Country: Sweden
- Language: Swedish

Dance in the Smoke (Swedish: I rök och dans) is a 1954 Swedish musical comedy film directed by Bengt Blomgren and Yngve Gamlin and starring Martin Ljung, Annalisa Ericson and Stig Järrel.

It was shot at the Råsunda Studios in Stockholm. The film's sets were designed by the art director Nils Svenwall. The film premiered on July 30, 1954, at the Spegeln cinema in Stockholm. It has been shown on several occasions on SVT, including in 1969, 1983, 2019, 2021 and in May 2022.

== Cast ==
- Martin Ljung as Martin / Karl Huno Tolftén / Alvard / Sörpel-Martin / Tattar-Martin
- Annalisa Ericson as Anna-Marja
- Stig Järrel as Per
- Holger Löwenadler as Stor-Hugge
- Hjördis Petterson as Aurora Tolftén
- Georg Funkquist as Museum guard
- Börje Mellvig as Office manager / Görtz
- Ingvar Kjellson as Snål-Jampe
- Jan-Erik Lindqvist as Algot
- Birgitta Andersson as Wife in Martin's movie
- Lennart Lundh as Husband in Martin's movie
- Ulla Petré as Young talent
- Ludde Juberg as Constable
- Alf Östlund as Vicar
- Göthe Grefbo as Constable
- Mille Schmidt as Fröjdevall
- Carl-Axel Elfving as Löv
- Eric Gustafson as Nöppevall
- Astrid Bodin as Tyll-Stina
- Karl Erik Flens as Blom
- Gustaf Hiort af Ornäs as Johnson
- David Erikson as Talent scout
- Yngve Gamlin as Gusten II
- Bengt Blomgren as Narrator / Man bathing naked
- Povel Ramel as Narrator / Wolrath von der Nytting / Gusten I
- Britt-Marie Adolfsson as Ghost
- Sten Ardenstam as Policeman
- Tore Bark as Member of 'Flickery Flies'
- Brita Borg as Member of 'Flickery Flies'
- Rune Broms as Bodnislaw
- Margit Carlqvist as Woman in Haystack
- Sven-Axel Carlsson as Bellboy
- Lars Ekborg as Man in Haystack
- Hasse Ekman as Gentleman in Haystack
- Claes Esphagen as Fors
- Ann-Marie Gyllenspetz as Woman in Haystack
- Allan Johansson as Member of 'Flickery Flies'
- Bertil Johnson as Postman
- Solveig Jäder as Beautiful Woman
- Willy Koblanck as Policeman
- Carl-Uno Larsson as Pojke med grässtrån
- Birger Malmsten as Man in Haystack
- Sangrid Nerf as Beautiful Woman
- Börje Nyberg as Svantelin
- Oscar Rundqvist as Member of 'Flickery Flies'
- Hanny Schedin as Stor-Hugge's Wife
- Nora Sjöberg as Cashier
- Margareta Stensköld as Milk Deliverer
- Elsa Textorius as Snål-Mor
- Ingrid Thulin as Woman in Haystack
- Nils Whiten as Janitor

== Bibliography ==
- Qvist, Per Olov & von Bagh, Peter. Guide to the Cinema of Sweden and Finland. Greenwood Publishing Group, 2000.
