= Mikael Ramel =

Swedish singer and musician (born 1949)

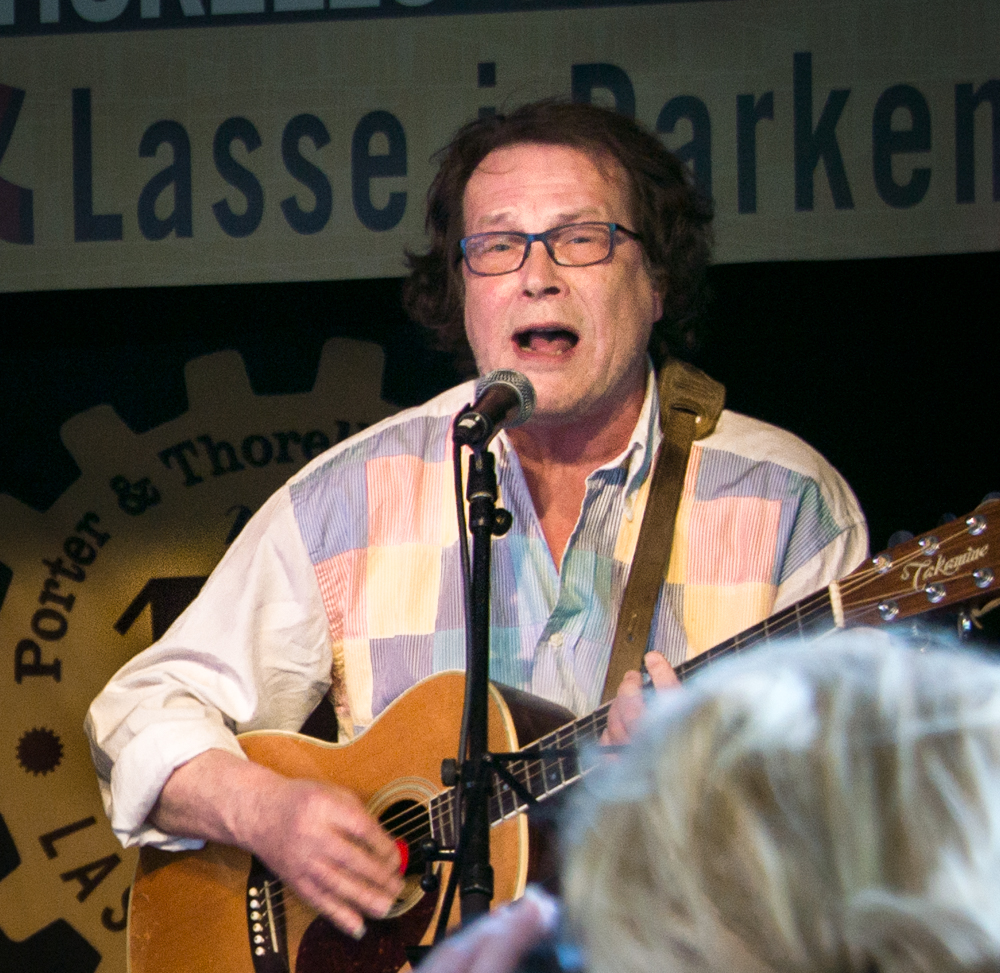
- Mikael Ramel performing in June 2017

Background information
- Born: Mikael Ramel; January 19, 1949 (age 76); Stockholm, Sweden
- Instrument: guitar

Baron Mikael Ramel (born 19 January 1949) is a Swedish singer and musician. He is the son of Povel Ramel and Susanna Ramel, and the brother of actress Lotta Ramel. His nephew is Jim Ramel Kjellgren. Ramel studied at the Solbacka läroverk at Stjärnhov, and in 1966 he became a member of the band Mufflers. In 1965, he participated in the television show Ramel i rutan along with his father. They also recorded the music single En ren familjeprodukt together. The same year he started the music group Steampacket, and they released eight music singles until 1968.

In 1967, Ramel also released the solo single Mikael & Michael along with Michael B. Tretow.

Ramels first solo album named Till dej was released in 1972. That same year he became a member of the band Fläsket brinner. Ramels second album Extra vagansa (1974) was followed by the third album 3:dje skivan (1977).

During the 1990s, Ramel released another three albums Strömavbrott (1982), Bra sak (1984) and En för alla (1986). In 1986, Ramel was awarded the Karamelodiktstipendiet an award that annually are given to someone who uses the Swedish language in music, established by his father.
