= On Top of Old Smoky =

American folk song

Single by The Weavers and Terry Gilkyson
- A-side: "Across the Wide Missouri"
- Published: 1917
- Released: 1951
- Recorded: February 21, 1951
- Genre: Folk
- Length: 2:39
- Label: Decca
- Songwriter: Traditional (arranged by Pete Seeger)

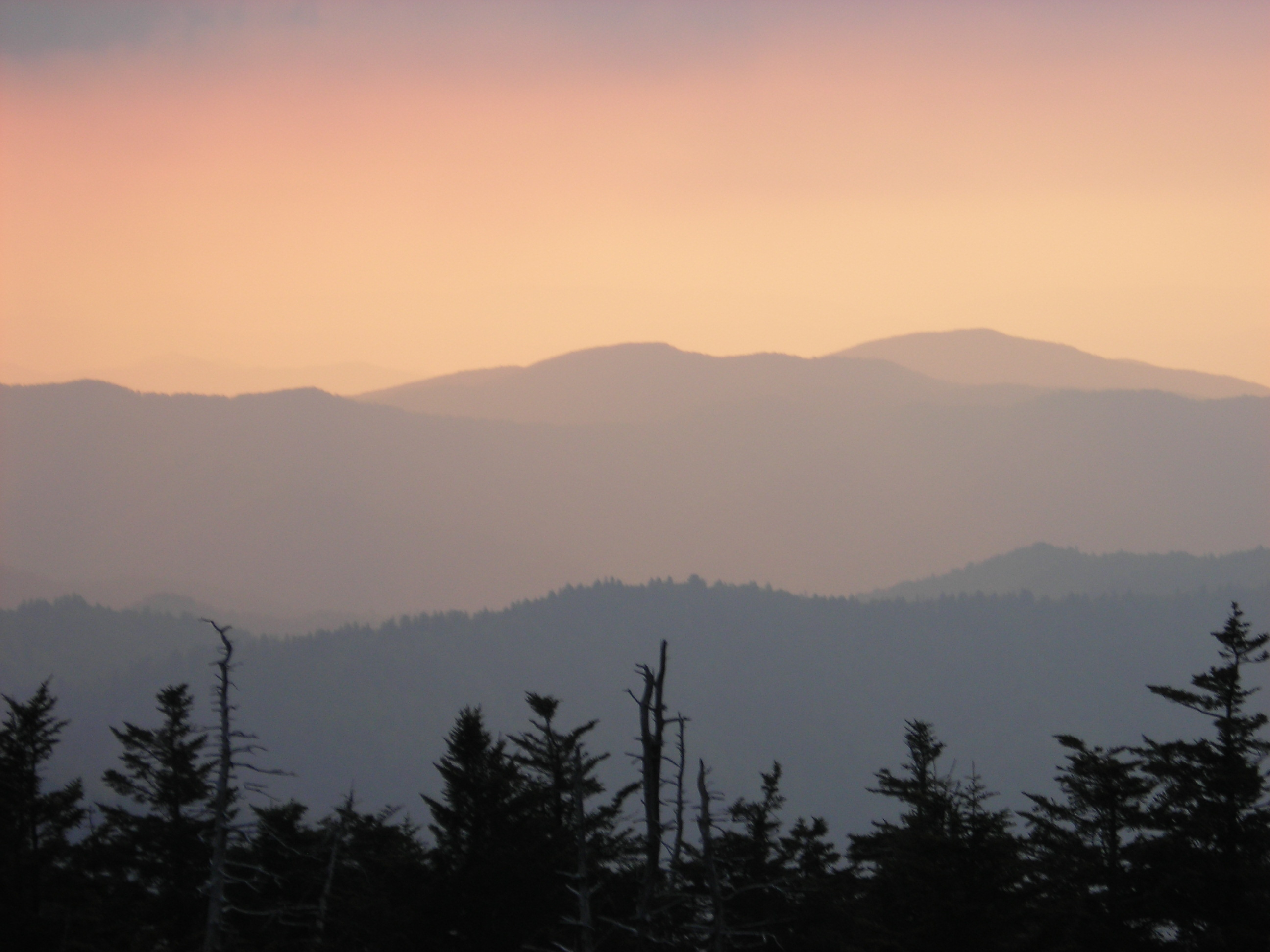
The Appalachian Mountains (probable place of origin) viewed from Kuwohi (Clingman's Dome) which is perhaps "Old Smoky")

"On Top of Old Smoky" (often spelled "Smokey") is a traditional folk song and nursery rhyme of the United States. It is catalogued as Roud Folk Song Index No. 414. As recorded by the Weavers, the song reached the pop music charts in 1951.

In one version the first verse is the following;

On top of Old Smoky,
All covered with snow,
I lost my true lover
For courtin' too slow.

== History as folk song ==
It is unclear when, where, and by whom the song was first sung. In historical times, folk songs were the informal property of the communities that sang them, passed down through generations. They were published only when a curious person took the trouble to visit singers and document their songs, an activity that in America began only around the turn of the 20th century. For this reason, it is unlikely that an originator of "On Top of Old Smoky" could ever be identified.

One of the earliest versions of "On Top of Old Smoky" to be recorded in fieldwork was written down by the English folklorist Cecil Sharp, who during the First World War made three summer field trips to the Appalachian Mountains seeking folk songs, accompanied and assisted by Maud Karpeles. Sharp and Karpeles found to their delight that the Appalachians, then geographically isolated, were a strong preserve of traditional music and that many of the people they met were naturally gifted singers who knew a great number of songs. They were also intrigued to find that many of the songs the people sang to them were versions of songs Sharp had earlier collected from people in rural England, suggesting that the ancestors of the Appalachian residents had brought them over from the old country.

The version of "On Top of Old Smoky" that Sharp and Karpeles collected was sung to them on 29 July 1916 by Miss Memory Shelton in Alleghany, Madison County, North Carolina. Shelton was part of a family of which several members sang for Sharp. The first verse as she sang it was transcribed by Sharp and Karpeles as follows:

In the lyrics, sparking is a now-rare word that means "courting". As can be seen, Memory Shelton also avoided the extreme prolongation of the syllables of Smoky and lover that are customary today, instead assigning just one musical beat to Smo- and lov- and two to -key and -er. The version Shelton sang has twelve verses. It was published twice: first in the preliminary volume of folk songs prepared by Sharp and Karpeles after their first summer of fieldwork (Sharp and Karpeles 1917), then in 1932 after Sharp's death, in the much larger compendium of Appalachian folk songs that Karpeles edited from the full notes of their three summers' fieldwork.

American fieldworkers were also active in the Appalachians. A (tuneless) text for "On Top of Old Smoky", similar to what Memory Shelton sang, was published by E. C. Perrow in 1915, slightly before Sharp's fieldwork. In the following decades, still further variants of "On Top of Old Smoky" were recorded by fieldworkers in North Carolina and Tennessee.

=== Alternative tunes and words ===
The Appalachian tradition characteristically spawned multiple variants of the same song. In the extreme case, the same basic set of words could be sung to more than one tune, or the same tune could adopt a completely different set of words. The now-standard tune of "On Top of Old Smoky" competed with a completely different tune, which Sharp and Karpeles also encountered in the Appalachians, and versions of this tune were also found by later fieldworkers. It was known to Memory Shelton as well, who shared it with Sharp and Karpeles thus:

The tune of "On Top of Old Smoky" familiar to most people today was also paired with a completely different set of words in a folk song called "The Little Mohee", about a frontiersman who falls in love with an Indian maiden (or, in some versions, a sailor who falls in love with a South Seas maiden). This tune was collected by the American fieldworkers Loraine Wyman and Howard Brockway in Pine Mountain, Kentucky from a singer named Mary Ann Bagley, and published by them in 1916, hence a year before the Sharp/Karpeles version mentioned above.

Because the versions gathered in fieldwork vary so much, there is no particular version of "On Top of Old Smoky" that can lay claim to being the "authentic" or "original" version. The version that Sharp and Karpeles collected from Memory Shelton can be read online (see Sharp and Karpeles (1917), in References below), and the version by Pete Seeger that greatly popularized the song in modern times (see below) is also online.

=== Location of "Old Smoky" ===
Old Smoky is plausibly a high mountain somewhere in the southern Appalachians, since so many versions recorded by fieldworkers were collected there. Possibilities include Kuwohi (then officially known as Clingman's Dome), named "Smoky Dome" by local Scotch-Irish inhabitants, but exactly which mountain it is may be lost to antiquity.

== Emergence of the song in popular music ==
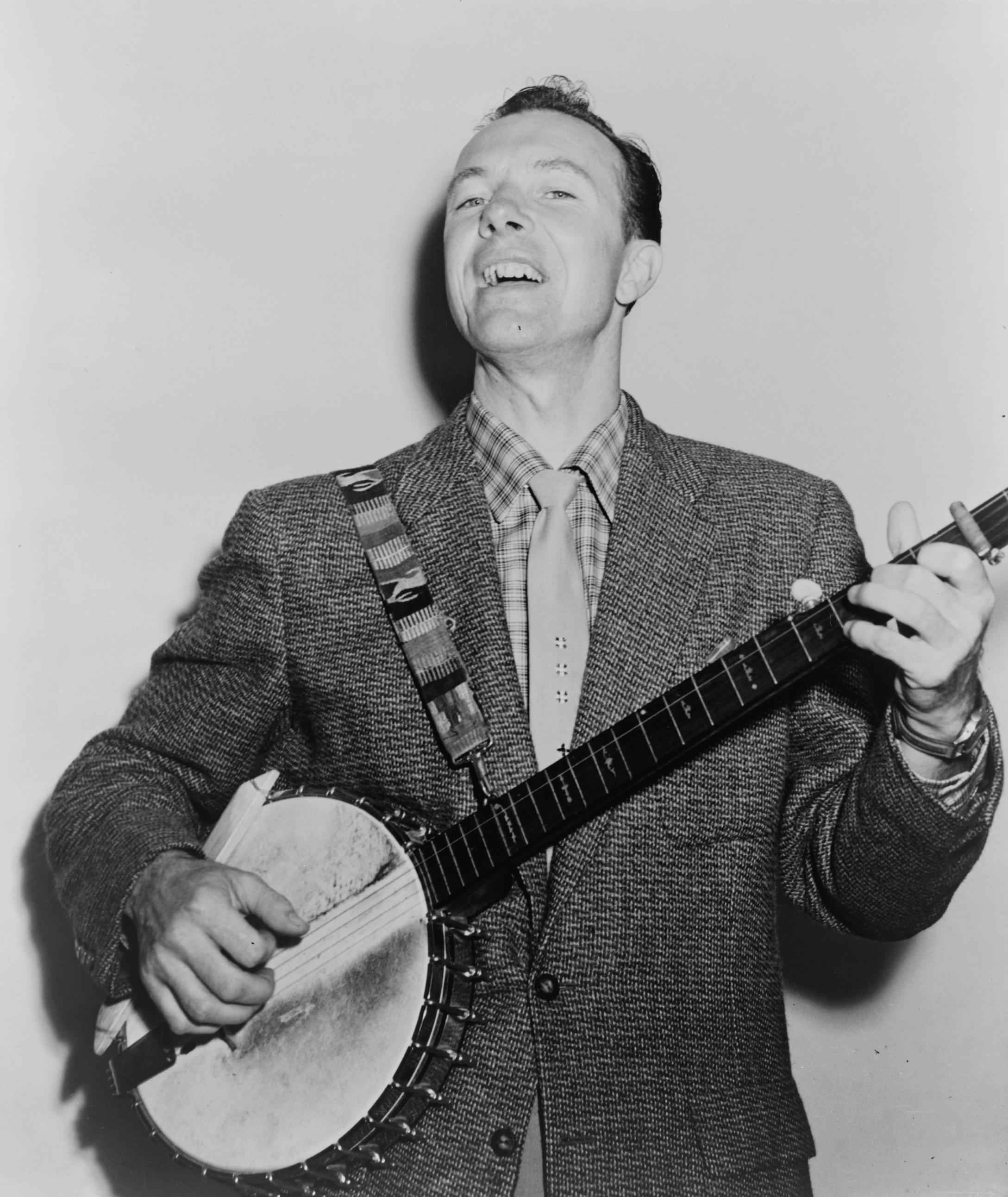
Pete Seeger in 1955

Cecil Sharp collected Appalachian folk songs just before the time when that music came to be "discovered" by the outside world and sold as a commercial product by the nascent recording industry, a development which would ultimately create the modern genre of country music. The first to make a commercial recording of "On Top of Old Smoky" was George Reneau, "The Blind Musician of the Smoky Mountains", who worked as a busker in Knoxville, Tennessee, just west of the Appalachians. In 1925, Reneau made the trip to New York City to record the song, and others, for Vocalion (Vo 15366). His version of "On Top of Old Smoky" used the alternative tune noted above.

In the 1940s through the mid-1960s, the United States experienced a folk music revival, of which Pete Seeger was a leading figure. His music, some of it drawn from scholarly sources like Sharp, was popular, and was disseminated widely in commercial recordings. Seeger modified a version of "On Top of Old Smoky" that he had learned in the Appalachians, writing new words and banjo music. He said that he thought that "certain verses go back to Elizabethan times." The sheet music for the song credited Seeger for "new words and music arrangement".

The Weavers, a folk-singing group that Seeger had co-founded, recorded a very popular version of the song, using Seeger's arrangement, on 21 February 1951. It was released by Decca Records as catalog number 27515, reaching No. 2 on the Billboard chart and No. 1 on the Cash Box chart, and selling over a million copies.

The enormous popularity of those recordings (and others following in their wake - see below) led to the curious situation of the song re-attaining folk status. It is one of the few songs that most Americans know from childhood, and many are unaware of the mid-century recordings that promulgated it so widely.

== Other versions ==
A number of artists released their versions following the success of the Weavers' recording. A version by Percy Faith & His Orchestra with Burl Ives on vocals reached No. 10 on the Billboard chart in 1951. It became one of Burl Ives' signature songs. Vaughn Monroe & His Orchestra also had success with the song, reaching No. 8 on the chart in June 1951.

Following its reintroduction to America by the Weavers, the song became a standard item of popular music, sung by Bing Crosby, Perry Como, Gene Autry, as well as (in a brief excerpt) Elvis Presley.

The country music singer Kenny Rogers sometimes used the first part of "On Top of Old Smoky" as a joke in concert. He played the opening bars of "Lucille", one of his big hits, and told the crowd something along the lines of "None of you know what song this is". When the audience replied with "Yes, we do", Rogers then began to sing "On Top of Old Smoky."

A great many versions followed in the ensuing decades. The following list is ordered chronologically.

In 1951, Swedish revue group Flickery Flies with Brita Borg recorded a Swedish version. This was during a time of collaboration with showbiz impresario and songwriter Povel Ramel who in a revue paraphrased it as "Högt uppe på berget, jag har till en vän, förlorat en femma, jag lär nog aldrig se den utigen" (High up on the mountain, I have to a friend, lost a 5 kronor bill, I doubt I'll see it again).

Dave Van Ronk included the song on his album The Mayor of McDougal Street: Rarities 1957–1969. This version sounds much more Celtic in nature, with more vocal ornamentation and a looser rhythmic structure.

Television host Jack Narz recorded the song for his album Sing the Folk Hits with Jack Narz in 1959.

Bing Crosby included the song in a medley on his album 101 Gang Songs (1961).

Harry Belafonte recorded a version on his 1962 album The Midnight Special. On the sleeves notes it states 'He wrote and tried out OLD SMOKEY during his 1961 summer tour'.

Alvin and the Chipmunks covered the song for their 1962 album The Chipmunk Songbook.

Little Eva, singer of "The Loco-Motion", recorded a version called "Old Smokey Locomotion" (1963), with lyrics describing how the residents of Old Smokey caught on to The Locomotion.

In 1978, "On Top of Old Smokey" was released by Swedish pop group ABBA (with lead vocals by Frida) as part of a medley that also included "Pick a Bale of Cotton" and "Midnight Special". The medley featured as the B-side to the group's single "Summer Night City".

In 1979, Larry Groce and the Disneyland Children's Sing-Along Chorus sang it in volume 2 of Walt Disney Records "Children's Favorite Songs".

Bruce Springsteen performed the song in Portland, Oregon a few months after the 1980 eruption of Mount St. Helens as a tribute during The River Tour.

In 1991, Swedish comedy group(s) Galenskaparna och After Shave performed a variant in their "Grisen i Säcken" revue.

Alternative country band The Gourds gangstered the lyrics to "On Top of Old Smoky" in the song "I'm troubled" on their 1998 release Gogitchyershinebox.

== Parodies ==
- "On Top of Spaghetti" by Tom Glazer:

On top of spaghetti
All covered with cheese,
I lost my poor meatball
When somebody sneezed.

  - This version is widely known to children. The song reached #7 in Canada. The Dutch version, with as first line "een bord met spaghetti" ("a plate with spaghetti") by Rijk de Gooijer came out in 1963 as well. American musician Little Richard recorded a version of "On Top of Spaghetti" for his 1992 children's album Shake It All About.
- English football club Notts County use the tune of On Top Of Old Smoky for their signature club song “The Wheelbarrow Song.” The chant is believed to have originated in April 1990 during an away game against Shrewsbury Town. At half time and while 2–0 down, the traveling Notts County fans misheard a Shrewsbury chant that was also to the tune of On Top Of Old Smoky and mocked it using their own nonsensical lyrics. County would mount a second half comeback, drawing the game 2–2, and would end up getting promoted to the Football League Second Division (now the EFL Championship) at the end of the 1989/90 Football League Season. The chant would stick, especially after Notts County got promoted to the Football League First Division (now the Premier League) the following season, and would eventually become an official club anthem that is still passionately sung home and away by the Magpies faithful today.

I had a wheelbarrow
The wheel fell off,
I had a wheelbarrow
The wheel fell off.

- In 2006, a Peachtree Ridge High School student was suspended for singing a parody of the song:

On top of Old [Smoky]
All covered with blood,
I shot my poor teacher
With a .44 slug.

  - A similar parody is sung by Rocky, Colt, and Tum-Tum in the 1992 film 3 Ninjas, and an older parody where the teacher is shot by a rubber band emerged circa 1963.

== Use in classical music ==
In 1953, Ernő Dohnányi used the tune (and also two other traditional American folktunes) in his final composition American Rhapsody.

== See also ==
- American folk music
- Appalachian music
