= Eva Rydberg =

Swedish entertainer

Eva Rydberg KVO
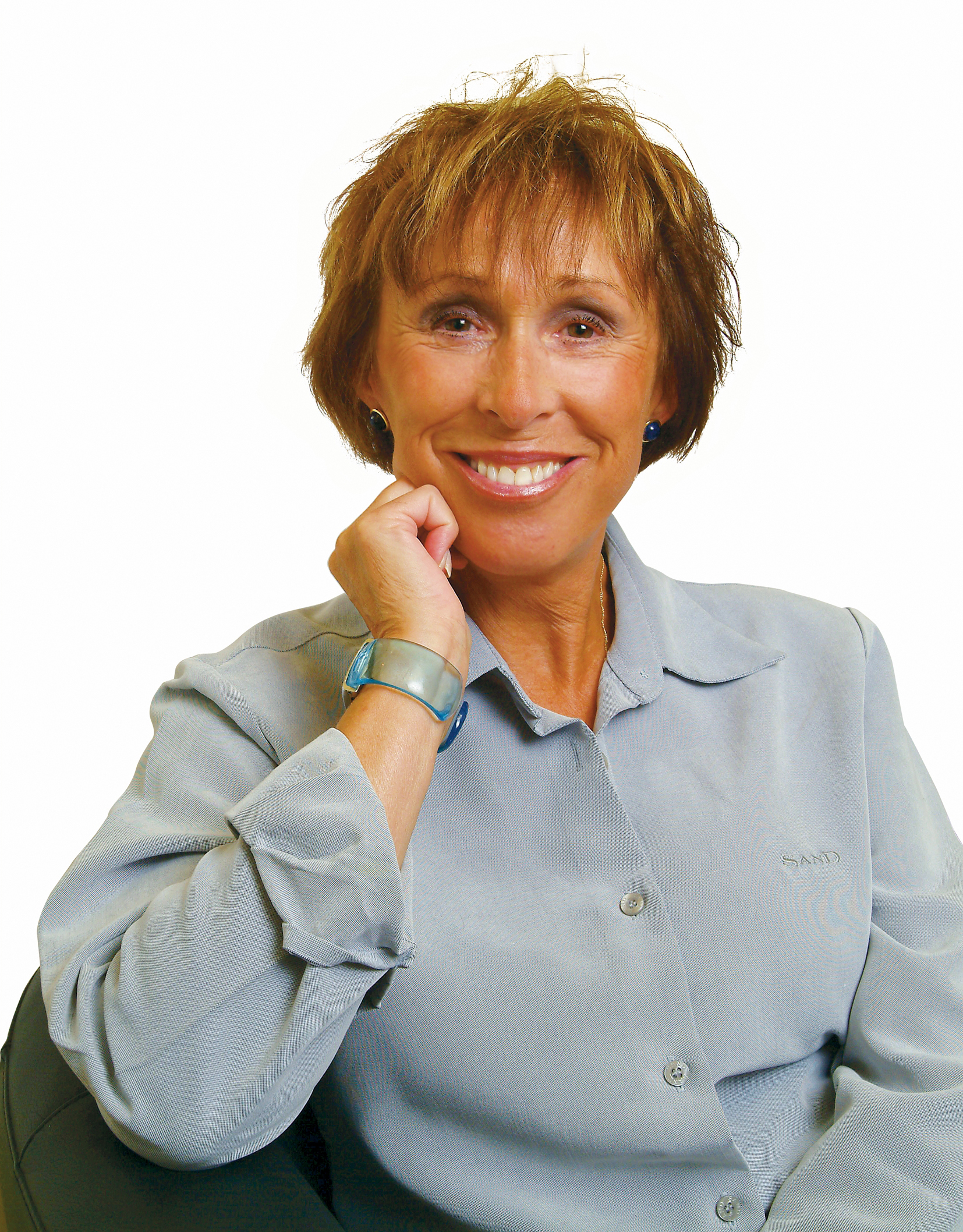
- Eva Rydberg (2013)
- Born: Eva Gunilla Johansson Rydberg; 20 June 1943 (age 82); Malmö, Sweden
- Occupations: Singer, actress, comedian, revue-artist, dancer

Eva Gunilla Johansson Rydberg KVO (born 20 June 1943) is a Swedish singer, actress, comedian, revue-artist and dancer.

== Biography ==
=== Early life ===
Eva Rydberg was born in Malmö. She started ballet school at a young age and acted at a children's theater at Malmö Folkets Park. In her teens, she danced ballet at Malmö Stadsteater. When she learnt that Povel Ramel was searching for dancers for the Knäppupp-Revue at the Ideontheater in Stockholm, she sent in a photo and got the job. During the summer of 1960, she toured Sweden with Knäppupp during the Karl Gerhards Jubelsommar tour. She then went to the Cirkus Schumann in Copenhagen and then toured with Cirkus Bennewis. At the end of the 1970s, she started working for Francois Bronett at Cirkus Scott and she has also performed at the Paris Olympia.

=== Theater and Geigert ===
Rydberg worked with Stora Teatern in Gothenburg and then Odense Theater in Denmark in 1965. There she played the part of the tomboy Anybody in the musical West Side Story. She got a three-year contract with Sandrews and did the same role at Oscarsteatern in Stockholm. In 1966, Rydberg appeared in her first television performance with the comedy segment during the Kvitt eller dubbelt show.

Owe Thörnqvist liked Rydberg's comedic skills and asked her to work with the Hamburger Börs bar shows in 1966. That was the start of a new era in her career. Lars Kühler was Rydberg's stage partner during several bar and television shows. She has also worked over the years with Björn Skifs, Siw Malmkvist, Tommy Körberg, Sten Ardenstam, Mikael Neumann and Ewa Roos.

=== Film, television, Theater ===
Rydberg has played in a few films, her first role on screen being aged 12 with the cult film Drra på, en kul grej på väg till Götet. She also had a part in the comedy film Sound of Näverlur in 1971. She has played parts in four of SVT's Julkalendern shows over the years: Teskedsgumman, Långtradarchaufförens berättelser, Trolltider and Superhjältejul.

She took part in Melodifestivalen 1977 with the entry "Charlie Chaplin" composed by Tomas Ledin, and placed seventh.

She starred in the musical Sweet Charity at Östgötateatern in Norrköping in 1989.

She participated in Melodifestivalen 2021 along with Ewa Roos with their song 'Rena Rama Ding Dong'. The song qualified for the Andra Chansen round, however lost to Clara Klingenström's song and was thus eliminated.

== Personal life ==
Rydberg is married to musician Tony Johansson with whom she has a daughter, singer Birgitta Rydberg. She also has a son Kalle Rydberg with Mats Hellqvist.

=== Distinctions ===
- Sweden: Royal Order of Vasa, Commander (21 March 2024)

== Productions ==
=== Filmography (selection) ===
- 1955 – Blue Sky
- 1967 – Drra på – kul grej på väg till Götet
- 1968 – Mysinge motell (TV)
- 1968 – Korridoren
- 1970 – Vicken vecka (TV)
- 1971 – Sound of Näverlur
- 1971 – Fixarverkstan (TV)
- 1975 – Långtradarchaufförens berättelser (TV)
- 1977 – Olle Blom – reporter (TV)
- 1978 – Det låter som en saga (TV-film)
- 1979 – Makten och hederligheten (TV)
- 1979 – Trolltider (TV)
- 1989 – The Journey to Melonia
- 2005 – Om Sara
- 2009 – Superhjältejul (TV)

=== Discography (selection) ===
- 1973 – Eva med E
- 1975 – Hallå där
- 1976 – Eva Rydberg
- 1978 – Sång à la Rydberg
- 1984 – Cirkuslivet

=== Theater work (Fredriksdalsteatern) ===
- 1993 – Bröderna Östermans huskors (with Nils Poppe)
- 1994 – Den tappre soldaten Bom
- 1995 – Husan också
- 1996 – Upp till camping
- 1998 – Sicken ärta
- 1999 – Fars lilla tös
- 2000 – Arnbergs korsettfabrik
- 2001 – Kärlek och lavemang
- 2002 – Hon jazzade en sommar
- 2003 – Kaos i folkparken
- 2004 – Mölle by the Sea
- 2005 – Hemvärnets glada dagar
- 2006 – Herrskap och tjänstehjon
- 2007 – Den stora premiären
- 2008 – Rabalder i Ramlösa
- 2009 – Lorden från gränden
- 2010 – Gröna hissen
- 2011 – Viva la Greta
- 2012 – Arsenik och gamla spetsar
- 2013 – 'Allå, 'allå, 'emliga armén|'Allo 'allo! emliga armén
- 2014 – Pang i bygget

=== Other theater work ===
- 1965 – West side story (Oscarsteatern)
- 1966 – Hello Dolly (Oscarsteatern)
- 1970 – Hagges revy – Oss jämlikar emellan (Lisebergsteatern)
- 1971 – Hagges revy – Hjärtat i Götet (Lisebergsteatern)
- 1972 – Hagges revy – Gatans barn (Lisebergsteatern)
- 1984 – Parneviks Revyparty (Chinateatern)
- 1989 – Sweet Charity (Östgötateatern)
- 1991 – Omaka par (Helsingborgs Stadsteater)
- 1993 – Pippi Långstrump (Nöjesteatern, Malmö)
- 1994 – Omaka par (Lisebergsteatern)
- 1995 – Husan också! (Lisebergsteatern)
- 1995 – Annie (Köpehamn)
- 1996 – Gröna Hissen (Palladium, Malmö)
- 1996 – Lilla Fransyskan (Palladium, Malmö)
- 1997 – Prosit! Kommissarien (Palladium, Malmö)
- 2000 – Kärlek till tusen (Turné med Riksteatern)
- 2001 – En midsommarnattsdröm (Hipp, Malmö)
- 2001 – Pippi Långstrump (Nöjesteatern Malmö)
- 2002 – Arnbergs korsettfabrik (Intiman Stockholm)
- 2003 – Änglar med glorian på sne (Nöjesteatern Malmö + turné)
- 2004 – Schlageryra i Folkparken (Intiman Stockholm)
- 2005 – Annie (Nöjesteatern Malmö)
- 2007 – Den stora premiären (Intiman Stockholm)
- 2009 – Boeing Boeing (Nöjesteatern Malmö)
- 2011 – Obesvarad Kärlek – En sann Broadwaykomedi (Slagthuset, Malmö)

=== Singles ===
Title	Year	Peak chart positions	Album
Title	Year	SWE	Album
"Rena rama ding dong" (with Ewa Roos)	2021	33	Non-album single
"Länge leve livet" (with Ewa Roos)	2023	-	Non-album single
