= George Reneau =

- Also known as: George Hobson
- Born: George McKinley Reneau; May 18, 1902; Dandridge, Tennessee, U.S.
- Died: June 5, 1938 (aged 36) Knoxville, Tennessee
- Genres: Country; traditional; gospel
- Occupations: Musician; street performer
- Instruments: Vocals; guitar; harmonica; banjo
- Years active: 1920s–1930s
- Labels: Vocalion; Edison; Regal; Domino; Silvertone

George McKinley Reneau (May 18, 1902 – June 5, 1938) was an American blind street musician who became one of country music's earliest recording artists. Known as "The Blind Musician of the Smoky Mountains", Reneau recorded more than 50 songs on the Vocalion and Edison labels in the mid-1920s. While he is credited on his early recordings as a solo artist on vocals, guitar and harmonica, the singing on many if not most of his songs was by an uncredited Gene Austin, a vaudville performer and Tin Pan Alley composer who would become one of the most successful recording artists of the era.

== Early life ==
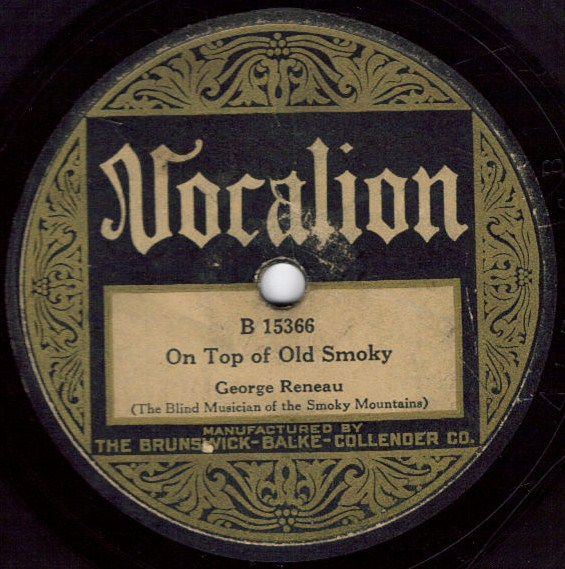
Vocalion Records label of one of George Reneau's 1925 releases

Reneau was born on May 18, 1902, in Dandridge, Jefferson County, Tennessee, between the Cumberland Plateau and the Smoky Mountains on the state's eastern border with North Carolina. While not much is known about his early life, Reneau is believed to have been born blind. At an early age, he attended the Nashville School for the Blind and eventually relocated from Dandridge to nearby Knoxville. Reneau, who began playing guitar and harmonica in his late teens or early 20s and later learned to play the banjo, became a street performer in the Market House area of the city's downtown.

== Career ==
In early 1924, the manager of the phonograph and record department in a Knoxville furniture store recommended Reneau to Vocalion Records, which was looking for new talent to record. Traveling to the company's studios in New York City several times over the next two years, Reneau recorded 50 songs for the label. While he was given solo credit on his Vocalion recordings, scholars later determined the vocalist on many of the releases was actually Gene Austin, since Reneau's harmonica playing can often be heard during the singing.

By late 1925, when he recorded the last of his Vocalion releases, Reneau was doing all of his own singing. Over this period, he also re-recorded 10 of his songs for the Edison label as the Blue Ridge Duo with Austin as vocalist. After his contract with Vocalion ended, he teamed up with Lester McFarland, another blind musician from Knoxville and a championship fiddler, and in 1927, the two recorded several sides for minor labels as the Gentry Brothers.

Between recording sessions, Reneau continued to perform on the streets of Knoxville, supporting himself, his wife and two step-children. In the summer of 1925, he was arrested for violating the city's anti-begging law as well as for drunkenness. The latter charge was dismissed, and Reneau was found not guilty of begging by a magistrate who was sitting in for the regular judge. When the police arrested Reneau again for performing on the streets, the judge ruled in the musician's favor on the grounds he had not specifically asked for contributions from passers-by.

== Final years ==
Reneau's recording career ended by his mid-20s, and over the next decade he eked out a living on Knoxville's streets. After contracting rheumatism in his arms, he was no longer able to play guitar or banjo, and in 1932, his brother-in-law, who was also blind, began accompanying him, playing guitar while Reneau sang along. By the late 1930s, Reneau's health had deteriorated further, and he died of pneumonia on June 5, 1938, at the age of 36.

== Recordings ==
Following are all of Reneau's releases for the Vocalion label as well as his recordings on Edison with Gene Austin as the Blue Ridge Duo. Note that a few of Reneau's Vocalion recordings featured Tennessee champion fiddler "Uncle Am" Stuart. This listing does not include Reneau's releases for miscellaneous labels under various pseudonyms, nor does it cover his work with Lester McFarland.

=== Vocalion Records as solo artist ===
- Arkansaw Traveler, 1924
- Bad Companions, 1925
- Baggage Coach Ahead, The, 1925
- Bald Headed End of the Broom, 1924
- Birmingham, 1924
- Blue Ridge Blues, 1924
- C. & O. Wreck, The, 1924
- Casey Jones, 1924
- Fatal Wedding, The, 1925
- Gambling on the Sabbath Day, 1925
- Hand of Fate, The, 1925
- Here, Rattler, Here (Calling the Dog), 1924
- I'm Glad My Wife's in Europe, 1925
- I've Got the Railroad Blues, 1924
- Jack and Joe, 1925
- Jesse James, 1924
- Letter Edged in Black, The, 1925
- Life's Railway to Heaven, 1924
- Lightning Express, The, 1925
- Little Brown Jug, 1924
- Little Rosewood Casket, 1925
- Lonesome Road Blues, 1924
- Love Always Has Its Way, 1925
- May I Sleep in Your Barn Tonight, Mister?, 1925
- My Redeemer, 1924
- New Market Wreck, The, 1924
- Old Man on the Hill, The, 1925
- Old Rugged Cross, The 1925
- On Top of Old Smoky, 1925
- Prisoner's Song, The, 1925
- Railroad Lover, 1925
- Red Wing, 1924
- Rock All Our Babies to Sleep, 1925
- Rovin' Gambler, 1925
- Sinking of the Titanic, The, 1925
- Smoky Mountain Blues, 1924
- Softly and Tenderly, 1925
- Susie Ann, 1924
- Turkey in the Straw, 1924
- Two Orphans, The, 1925
- Weeping Willow Tree, The, 1925
- We're Floating Down The Stream Of Time, 1925
- When I Shall Cross Over the Dark Rolling Tide, 1925
- When the Work's All Done This Fall, 1925
- When You and I Were Young, Maggie, 1924
- Wild and Reckless Hobo, 1925
- Wild Bill Jones, 1925
- Woman"s Suffrage, 1925
- Wreck of the Southern 97, The, 1924
- You Will Never Miss Your Mother Until She Is Gone, 1924

=== Edison Records as Blue Ridge Duo ===
- Arkansas Traveler, 1924
- Blue Ridge Blues, 1925
- Life's Railway to Heaven, 1925
- Little Brown Jug, 1924
- Lonesome Road Blues, 1925
- Sinking of the Titanic, 1926
- Susie Ann, 1924
- Turkey in the Straw, 1924
- Wreck of the C. & O., 1926
- You Will Never Miss Your Mother Until She Is Gone, 1925
