= Jim Ramel Kjellgren =

Swedish actor

Jim Love Ramel Kjellgren (born 18 July 1987) is a Swedish actor. He is the son of Lotta Ramel and Johan H:son Kjellgren and the grandchild of Povel Ramel. He is perhaps best known as the character Jonte in the SVT series Eva & Adam, he reprised the role in the film Eva & Adam – fyra födelsedagar och ett fiasko.

In 2020, Jim married Bernadette Gisele Hutson, who is French-American.

== Filmography ==
- 1999–2000 – Eva & Adam (TV-series)
- 2001 – Eva & Adam – fyra födelsedagar och ett fiasko
- 2001 – Days Like This
- 2004 – Kyrkogårdsön
- 2005 – Storm
