= Ålder okänd =

1991 Swedish miniseries

- Written by: Richard Hobert
- Directed by: Richard Hobert
- Starring: Harriet Andersson; Sven-Bertil Taube
- Music by: Åke Parmerud
- Country of origin: Sweden
- Original language: Swedish
- No. of seasons: 1
- No. of episodes: 3

Production
- Producer: Aina Behring
- Cinematography: Lars Crépin
- Running time: 131 minutes

Original release
- Network: SVT2
- Release: 9 January – 23 January 1991

Ålder okänd (translates to Age Unknown) is a 1991 miniseries written and directed by Richard Hobert. The miniseries was shown on Swedish SVT2 in three parts of 50 minutes each.

== Plot ==
A scientist discovers what he believes to be a way of slowing down the ageing process, and has started to administer the substance to select people.

== Cast ==
- Harriet Andersson as Marianne Retke
- Christian Fiedler as Max Hoffman
- Henri Garcin as François Monet
- Lars Humble as Kurt Retke
- Patricia Lawrence as Barbara Heynes
- Sven Lindberg as Dahlberg
- Evert Lindkvist as Flygvapenchefen
- Lars Passgård as Actor
- Kajsa Reingardt as Katarina Retke
- Göran Stangertz as Business lawyer
- Eva-Britt Strandberg as Christina Lind
- Sven-Bertil Taube as Peter Wall
- Jan Tiselius as Borelius
- Thomas Ungewitter as Doctor
