= Halvar Björk =

Swedish actor (1928–2000)

- Born: Erik Halvar Bertil Björk; 22 September 1928; Borgvattnet, Sweden
- Died: 12 November 2000 (aged 72); Huddinge, Sweden
- Occupation: Actor
- Years active: 1944–1982
- Spouse: Alice Strid-Word (born 1930)

Erik Halvar Bertil Björk (22 September 1928 – 12 November 2000) was a Swedish actor. He worked at the Malmö City Theatre from 1962 to 1986, and he had many substantial film and TV roles; for example, he acted in Autumn Sonata (1978) and Sunday's Children (1992) by Ingmar Bergman and The Emigrants (1971) and The New Land (1972) by Jan Troell.

Björk won the Best Actor at the 5th Guldbagge Awards for his performance in the Yngve Gamlin film Badarna (1968). He died of lung cancer.

== Filmography ==
Year	Title	Role	Notes
1965	The Chasers	Kalle Olofsson	
1967	Kärlek 1-1000		
1968	Badarna	Knoppen Berglund	
1969	The Shot	Len's Father	
1969	Den vilda jakten på likbilen	Sven	
1971	The Emigrants	Anders Månsson, Hennes Son	
1972	Deadline	Halvar	
1972	The New Land	Anders Månsson, hennes son	
1974	Dunderklumpen!	Dunderklumpen / Jorm	Voice
1977	Tabu	Lennart / Margareta	
1978	Autumn Sonata	Viktor	
1980	Blomstrande tider	Dallas	
1980	Barna från Blåsjöfjället	Uno Hus	
1983	Raskenstam	Oskar Mattsson	
1989	The Pitfall	Westin	
1991	Önskas	Pfeiffer	
1992	Sunday's Children	Ericsson	
1992	Night of the Orangutan	Sunden	
1994	Illusioner	Yngve	
1997	Svenska hjältar	Marklund	
