= Johan H:son Kjellgren =

Swedish actor

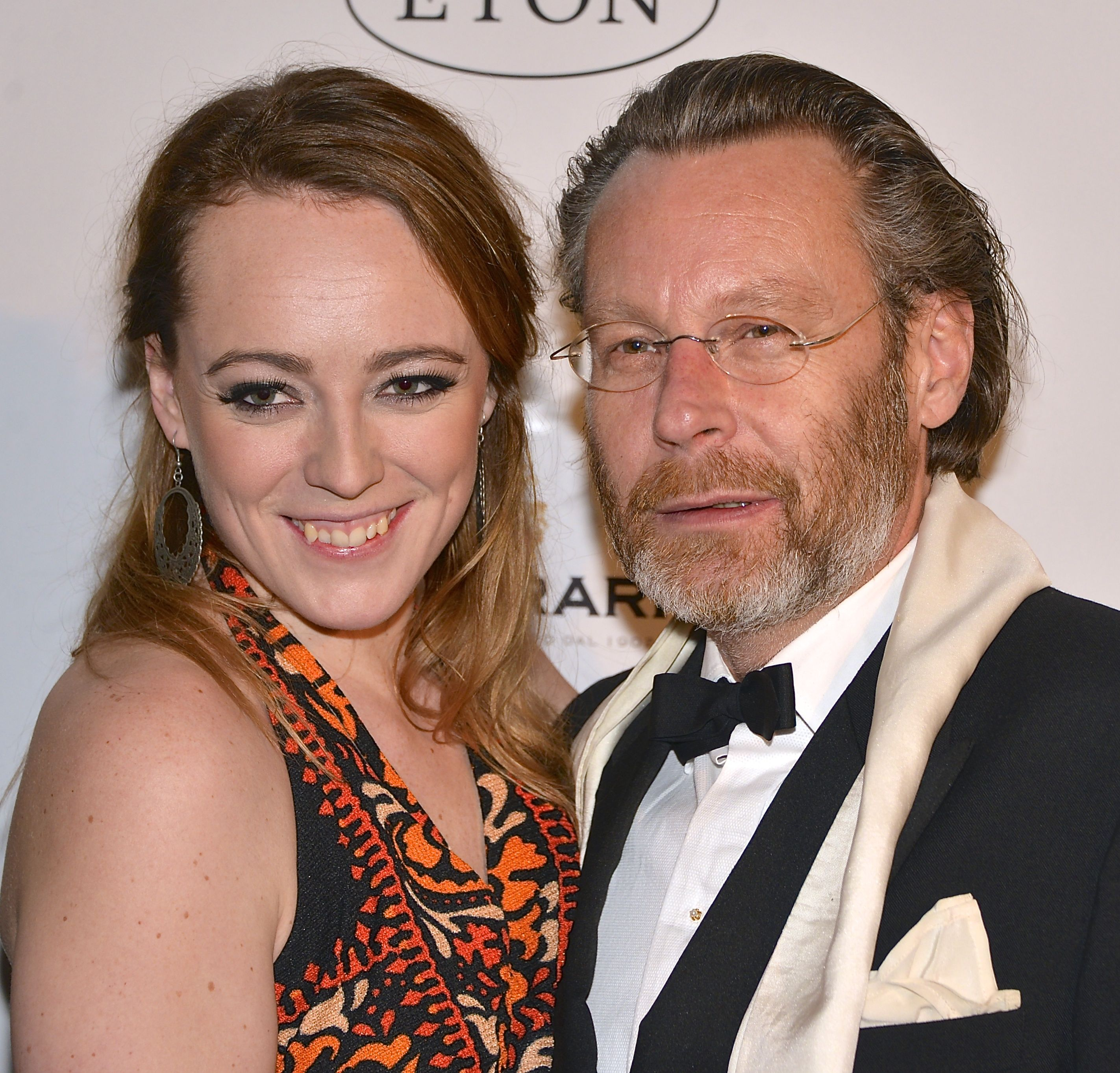
- Born: 6 January 1959

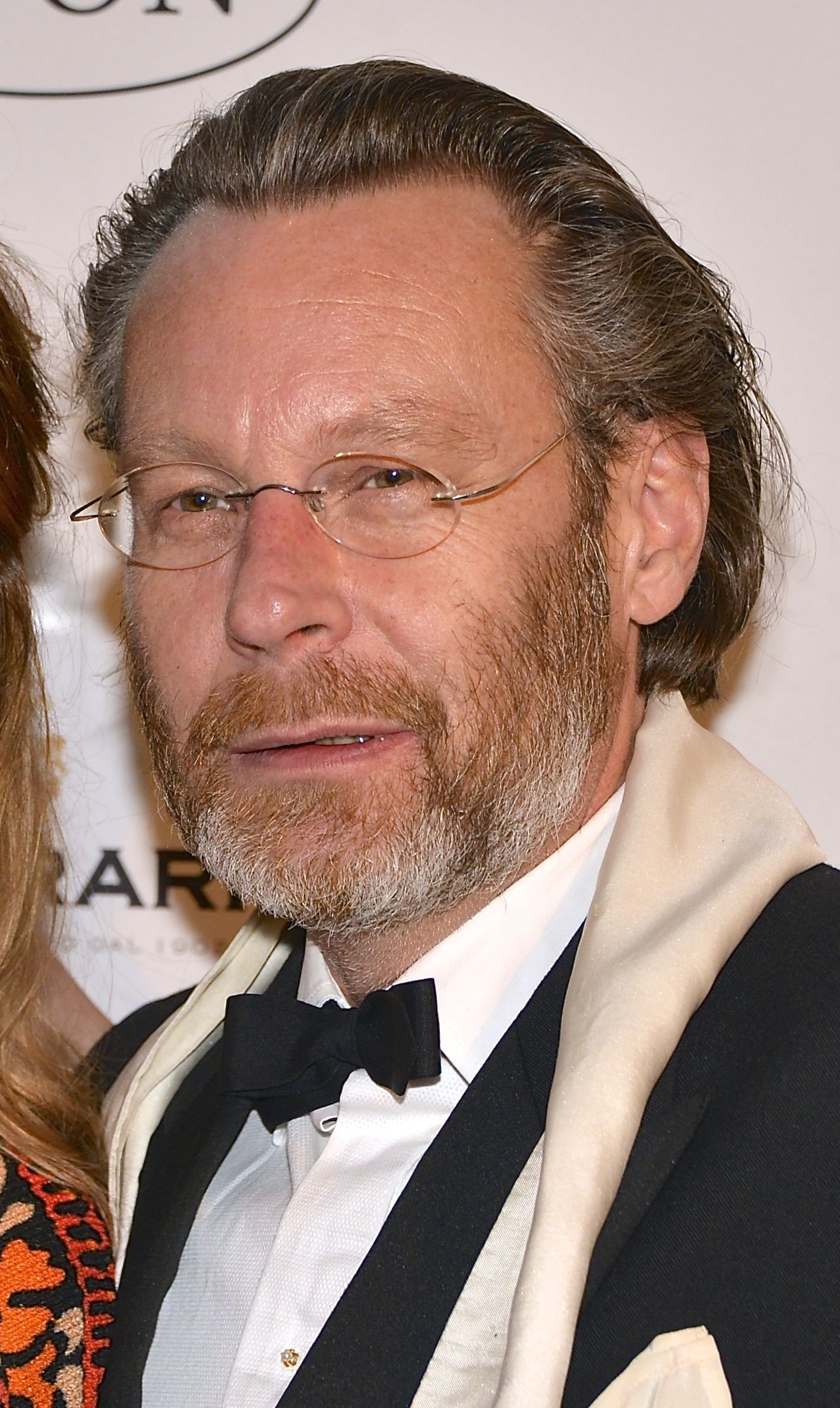
Johan H:son Kjellgren in 2013

Hans Erik Johan Hansson Kjellgren (born 6 January 1959) is a Swedish actor. Kjellgren grew up in Östermalm, Stockholm. He studied acting at Scenskolan in Gothenburg between 1981 and 1984 and first got work at the Folkteater in Gothenburg and then the Stockholm City Theatre.

He made his film debut in the Oscar Björk film Hip hip hurra! (1987), he then played in the SVT series Rederiet, and he won a Guldbaggen award in 1999 for Best Actor, for his role in the film Veranda för en tenor.

He has been married to Lotta Ramel, and together they have the son Jim Ramel Kjellgren.
