= Badarna =

1968 film

- Film poster
- Directed by: Yngve Gamlin
- Written by: Yngve Gamlin; Lars Ardelius
- Produced by: Göran Lindgren
- Starring: Ingrid Thulin
- Cinematography: Jan Lindeström
- Release date: 6 April 1968
- Running time: 98 minutes
- Country: Sweden
- Language: Swedish

Badarna is a 1968 Swedish drama film directed by Yngve Gamlin. Halvar Björk won the award for Best Actor at the 5th Guldbagge Awards.

== Cast ==
- Ingrid Thulin as Cook
- Halvar Björk as Knoppen Berglund
- Gunilla Olsson as Bua
- Björn Gustafson as Gott-Melker
- Åke Lindström as Kjellgren, social servant
- Betty Tuvén as Minni
- Gustaf Färingborg as Löfgren, Bua's father
- Leif Hedberg as Sam
- Lars Andersson as Karl
- Göthe Grefbo as Supervisor
- Stig Engström as Young man with big car
