= The Chasers (1965 film) =

1965 film

- Directed by: Yngve Gamlin
- Based on: "Jägarna II" by Per Olof Sundman
- Starring: Halvar Björk
- Cinematography: Jan Lindeström
- Edited by: Wic Kjellin
- Release date: 19 April 1965
- Running time: 94 minutes
- Country: Sweden
- Language: Swedish

The Chasers (Swedish: Jakten) is a 1965 Swedish drama film directed by Yngve Gamlin. It is based on the short story "Jägarna II" by Per Olof Sundman. It was entered into the 16th Berlin International Film Festival where it won the Silver Bear Extraordinary Jury Prize.

== Cast ==
- Halvar Björk as Kalle Olofsson
- Leif Hedberg as Olle Stensson
- Lars Passgård as Desperado
- Curt Broberg as Commissioner
- Curt Ericson as Old Hunter
- Olle Nordgren as Young Hunter
