= La felicidad =

Song
- Written: 1966
- Songwriter(s): Palito Ortega

"La felicidad" is a song by Argentine singer Palito Ortega.

== Covers ==
- Swedish singer Ewa Roos cover "Vilken härlig dag" ("What a Wonderful Day") charted on Svensktoppen for 12 weeks in 1968, topping the chart for three weeks in July.
- Paraguayan singer Digno Garcia had a hit with the song in Belgium and The Netherlands, peeking at nr 4.
