= Ewa Roos =

Swedish singer and actress (born 1949)

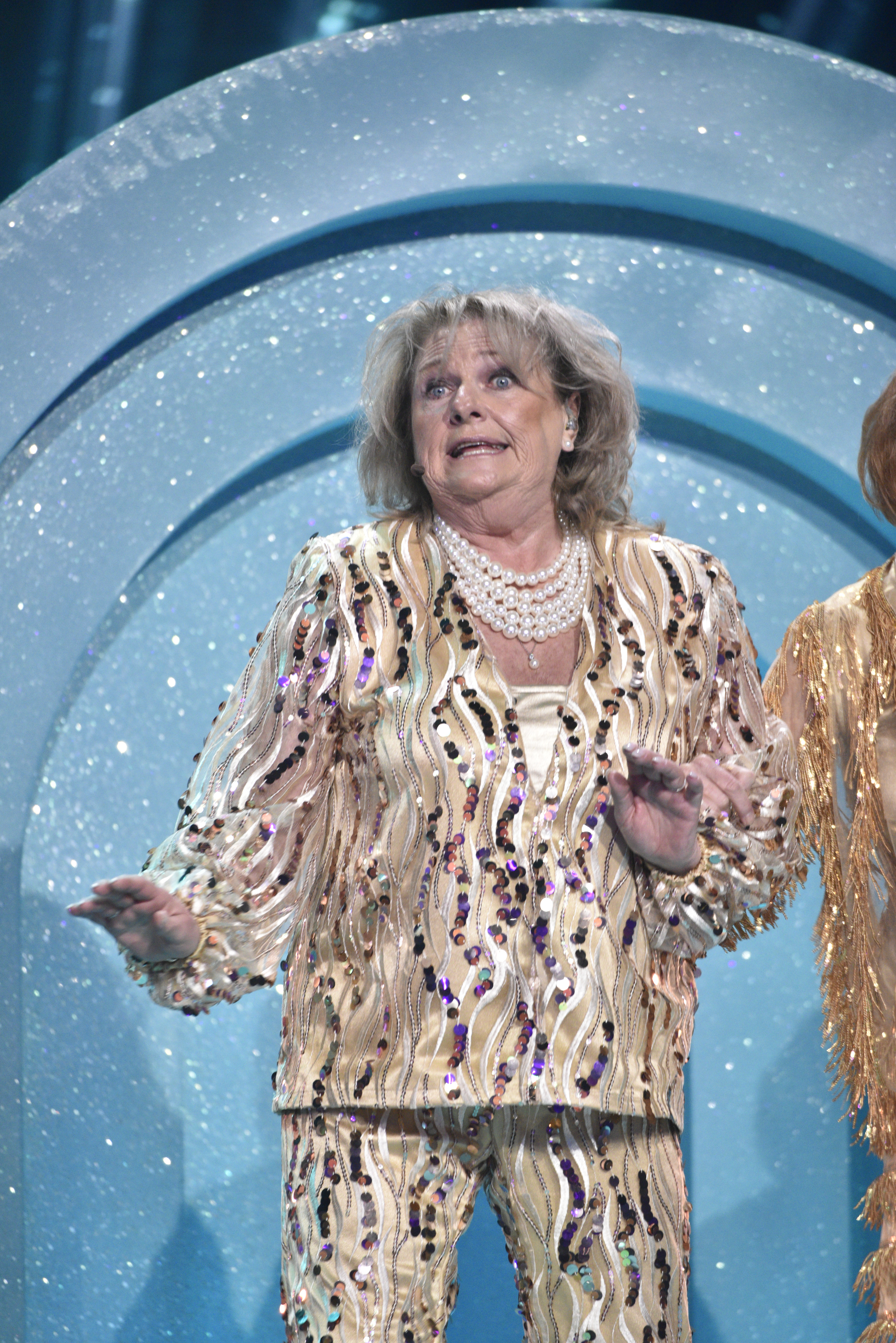
- Ewa Roos in 2023
- Born: Ewa Maria Roos; 12 June 1949 (age 76); Borås, Sweden
- Occupations: Singer, Actress

Ewa Maria Roos Sevenheim (born 12 June 1949 in Borås) is a Swedish singer and actress. Roos started her career at the age of thirteen when she won a talent search by the radio show Landet runt. She won a lead singer place in the orchestra Bosse Lidéns orkester; she was so young that she needed permission from childcare services to sing at nights and evenings. She recorded her first record called Polly the same year. In 1963, she won a talent competition hosted by Bildjournalen, and she represented Sweden in a singing competition in Riccone, Italy. She sang the song "I valet och kvalet", which was written by Owe Thörnqvist.

In 1968, she entered fourth place on Svensktoppen with the song "Tre små ord och jag förlåter", the same year she had her big breakthrough with the song "Vilken härlig dag" (the Swedish version of Argentine singer Palito Ortega's song "La felicidad"). After that followed hit singles "Amors pilar", "Ole Okay", "Ding dång jag hör bröllopsklockor" and "Sjung bort bekymren".

She was the very first guest in the televised Allsång på Skansen in 1979.

She also acted in several revue shows, among them along with Hagge Geigert at Lisebergsteatern in Gothenbyrg in 1970, and has also ventured in to theater with the role of Dolly Tate in Annie Get Your Gun at the Chinateatern.

She participated in Melodifestivalen 2021 along with Eva Rydberg with their song 'Rena Rama Ding Dong'. The song qualified for the Andra Chansen round, however lost to Clara Klingenström's song and was thus eliminated.

== Discography ==
=== Singles ===
Title	Year	Peak chart positions	Album
Title	Year	SWE	Album
"Rena rama ding dong" (with Eva Rydberg)	2021	33	Non-album single
"Länge leve livet" (with Eva Rydberg)	2023	-	Non-album single
