= The Great Amateur =

1958 film

- Directed by: Hasse Ekman
- Written by: Hasse Ekman
- Produced by: Povel Ramel; Felix Alvo
- Starring: Martin Ljung; Marianne Bengtsson; Hasse Ekman
- Cinematography: Martin Bodin
- Edited by: Ingemar Ejve
- Music by: Bengt Hallberg; Erik Nordgren; Harry Arnold; Allan Johansson
- Production company: Knäppupp
- Distributed by: Svensk Filmindustri
- Release date: 23 June 1958
- Running time: 92 minutes
- Country: Sweden
- Language: Swedish

The Great Amateur (Swedish: Den store amatören) is a 1958 Swedish comedy film directed by Hasse Ekman and starring Martin Ljung, Marianne Bengtsson and Yngve Gamlin. It was shot at the Råsunda in Stockholm. The film's sets were designed by the art director P.A. Lundgren.

== Cast ==
- Martin Ljung as constable Alfred Erlandsson
- Marianne Bengtsson as Linda Svensson
- Hasse Ekman as Max Wallby, Theatre director
- Yngve Gamlin as Lilja, mayor in Fårtuna
- Sven-Eric Gamble as Roffe, Max valet
- Einar Axelsson as Victor Wirén
- Brita Borg as artist "Fat Mammy Brown"/Viking woman
- Bullan Weijden as Olga af Klinting
- Berndt Westerberg as Police Commissary
- Margit Andelius as Ms Krans-Wetterlund
- Ludde Juberg as kapellmeister in anniversary play
- Povel Ramel as artist, Viking in anniversary play
- John Melin as Grönwall
- Georg Skarstedt as Nibbelöf
- Hanny Schedin as Linda's Aunt
- John Norrman as Auto Repair Man
- Astrid Bodin as Ms. Knarring
- Karl Erik Flens as Torsten, Actor
- Marianne Nielsen as Desdemona in 'Othello'
- Wiktor Andersson as Oskar, Electrician
- Bellan Roos as Mrs. Lithander
- Birgitta Andersson as Lita
- Gerd Andersson as Dancer
- Axel Högel as Jonasson, Janitor
- Jan Kings as Kalle, School Pupil
- Curt Löwgren as Messenger from the Mayor
- Olof Olsson as Major af Klinting
- Lars-Evert Peterson as Ulf, School Pupil
- Teddy Rhodin as Dancer
- Bo Samuelsson as Photographer
- Håkan Serner as Actor

== Bibliography ==
- Gustafsson, Fredrik. The Man from the Third Row: Hasse Ekman, Swedish Cinema and the Long Shadow of Ingmar Bergman. Berghahn Books, 2016.
