= Last Leap =

1970 film

- Directed by: Édouard Luntz
- Written by: Antoine Blondin; Jean Bolvary; Édouard Luntz
- Starring: Maurice Ronet
- Cinematography: Jean Badal
- Edited by: Colette Kouchner
- Release date: 7 August 1970
- Running time: 100 minutes
- Country: France
- Language: French

Last Leap (French: Le Dernier Saut) is a 1970 French crime film directed by Édouard Luntz. It was entered into the 1970 Cannes Film Festival.

== Cast ==
- Maurice Ronet - Garal
- Michel Bouquet - Jauran
- Cathy Rosier - Florence
- Eric Penet - Peras
- André Rouyer - Salvade
- Michel Garland - L'avocat
- Sady Rebbot - Le professeur
- Betty Beckers - La préposée
- Douchka - La serveuse
- Catherine Arditi - Christiane Dancour
- Albertine Bui - Tai
- Michel Charrel - Le patron du café
- Pierre Arditi
