= Édouard Luntz =

French film director

- Born: 8 August 1931; La Baule-Escoublac, France
- Died: 26 February 2009 (aged 77); Paris, France
- Occupations: Film director, screenwriter
- Years active: 1959–1980

Édouard Luntz (8 August 1931 – 26 February 2009) was a French film director. He directed nine films between 1959 and 1973. His 1966 film Les coeurs verts was entered into the 16th Berlin International Film Festival and his 1970 film Le dernier saut was entered into the 1970 Cannes Film Festival.

== Filmography ==
- ...Enfants des courants d'air (1959)
- Le silence (1960)
- Insolites et clandestins (1961)
- Bon pour le service (1963)
- L'escalier (1964)
- Les coeurs verts (1966)
- Le dernier saut (1970)
- L'humeur vagabonde (1972)
- Le grabuge (1973)
