= Martin Ljung =

Swedish comedian, actor and singer (1917–2010)

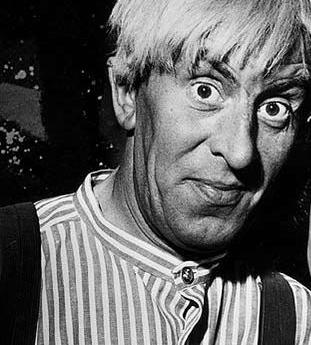
- Martin Ljung in 1960.
- Born: Martin Vilhelm Ljung; 15 August 1917; Luleå, Sweden
- Died: 30 September 2010 (aged 93); Stockholm, Sweden
- Occupations: Comedian, actor and singer
- Years active: 1947–2010
- Spouse: Birgit Kahlin (m. 1946)

Martin Vilhelm Ljung (15 August 1917 – 30 September 2010) was a Swedish comedian, actor and singer.

An apprentice blacksmith turned entertainer, his movie debut was in 1947, when he had uncredited appearances in several films, including the comedy Stackars lilla Sven with Nils Poppe and the drama Rallare (Navvies), directed by Arne Mattsson.

Ljung worked together with Povel Ramel for many years, and acted and sang in several of Ramel's revues, where he also performed comic monologues, including Ester and Fingal Olsson, which have become Swedish comedy classics.

He also worked with Hasse Alfredson and Tage Danielsson, in revues such as Spader, Madame! and Glaset i Örat, and movies such as The Apple War.

== Selected filmography ==
- Rail Workers (1947)
- The Realm of the Rye (1950)
- Kalle Karlsson of Jularbo (1952)
- Dance in the Smoke (1954)
- The Staffan Stolle Story (1956)
- The Great Amateur (1958)
