= Naked Hearts (1966 film) =

1966 film

- Directed by: Édouard Luntz
- Written by: Édouard Luntz
- Produced by: Raoul Ploquin
- Starring: Gérard Zimmermann
- Cinematography: Jean Badal
- Edited by: Colette Kouchner
- Release date: 1966
- Running time: 90 minutes
- Country: France
- Language: French

Naked Hearts (French: Les Cœurs verts) is a 1966 French drama film directed by Édouard Luntz. It was entered into the 16th Berlin International Film Festival.

The film tells the story of a group of young people from Nanterre, a suburb to the west of Paris. The main characters, Zim and Jean-Pierre, are part of a gang of greasers (referred to in French as «blousons noirs»), and meet in prison at the beginning of the film. The narrative traces their efforts to negotiate the dynamics of the group, find a job, and stay out of trouble (both are on provisional release after their initial brush with the law).

Naked Hearts is unusual for its period in its use of non-professional actors and for its mix of narrative and documentary elements. The group of young men at the center of the film is composed of residents of Nanterre, and Luntz purportedly worked closely with them in writing the story. Segments of voiceover appear at several points in the film, apparently recorded conversations with young people from the area.

== Cast ==
- Gérard Zimmermann as Zim
- Marise Maire as Jacqueline
- Eric Penet as Jean-Pierre
- Françoise Bonneau as Patricia
- Arlette Thomas as Jean-Pierre's Mother
- Elliott Stein
- Paul Préboist
