= Betty Tuvén =

Swedish actress

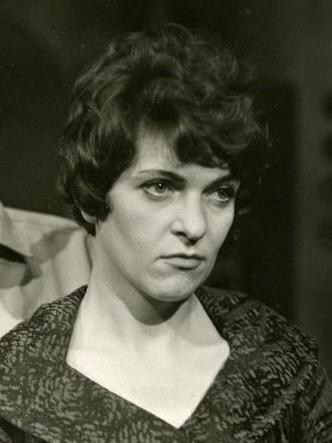

Betty Tuvén (born 30 May 1928 in Gothenburg - died 17 June 1999 in Stockholm) was a Swedish actress. She was engaged at Gothenburg City Theatre.

== Selected filmography ==
- 1996 - Anna Holt (TV)
- 1973 - Den vita stenen (TV)
- 1968 - Badarna
