= 16th Berlin International Film Festival =

1966 film festival in West Berlin, Germany

- Festival poster
- Location: West Berlin, Germany
- Founded: 1951
- Awards: Golden Bear: Cul-de-sac
- Festival date: 24 June – 5 July 1966
- Website: Website

Berlin International Film Festival chronology
- 17th 15th

The 16th annual Berlin International Film Festival was held from 24 June to 5 July 1966.

The Golden Bear was awarded to film Cul-de-sac directed by Roman Polanski.

== Jury ==
The following people were announced as being on the jury for the festival:

- Pierre Braunberger, French producer - Jury President
- Franz Seitz, West-German filmmaker and producer
- Emilio Villalba Welsh, Argentinian writer
- Khwaja Ahmad Abbas, Indian filmmaker, journalist and writer
- Pier Paolo Pasolini, Italian filmmaker, poet and writer
- Lars Forssell, Swedish poet, journalist and academic
- Hollis Alpert, American writer and film critic
- Helmuth de Haas, West-German journalist and writer
- Kurt Heinz, West-German composer

== Official Sections ==
=== Main Competition ===
The following films were in competition for the Golden Bear award:

English title	Original title	Director(s)	Production Country
A Question of Honour	Una questione d'onore	Luigi Zampa	Italy, France
The Chasers	Jakten	Yngve Gamlin	Sweden
Cul-de-sac		Roman Polanski	United Kingdom
Der Weibsteufel		Georg Tressler	Austria
The Fear	Ο φόβος	Kostas Manoussakis	Greece
Georgy Girl		Silvio Narizzano	United Kingdom
The Group		Sidney Lumet	United States
High Steel		Don Owen	Canada
The Hunt	La caza	Carlos Saura	Spain
Knud		Jørgen Roos	Denmark
Lord Love a Duck		George Axelrod	United States
Masculin Féminin	Masculin féminin: 15 faits précis	Jean-Luc Godard	France
Naked Hearts	Les coeurs verts	Édouard Luntz	France
Nayak	নায়ক	Satyajit Ray	India
No Shooting Time for Foxes	Schonzeit für Füchse	Peter Schamoni	West Germany
The Priest and the Girl	O Padre e a Moça	Joaquim Pedro de Andrade	Brazil
Rosalie		Walerian Borowczyk	France
Seasons of Our Love	Le stagioni del nostro amore	Florestano Vancini	Italy

== Official Awards ==
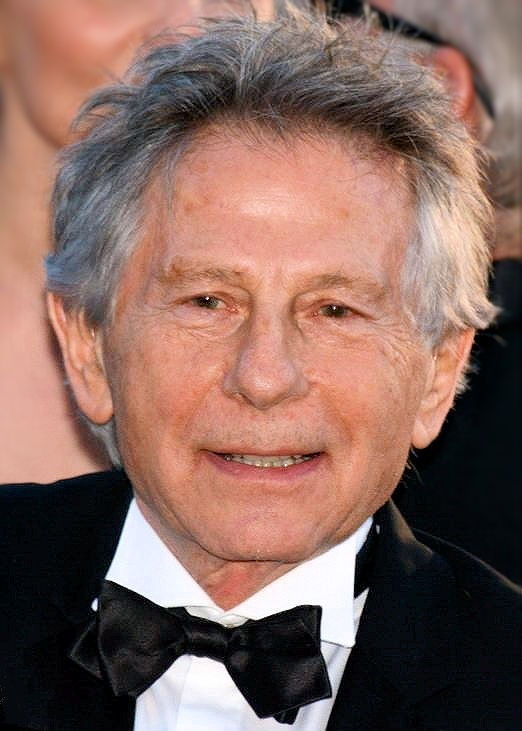
Roman Polanski, winner of the Golden Bear at the event

The following prizes were awarded by the Jury:

- Golden Bear: Cul-de-sac by Roman Polanski
- Silver Bear for Best Director: Carlos Saura for The Hunt
- Silver Bear for Best Actress: Lola Albright for Lord Love a Duck
- Silver Bear for Best Actor: Jean-Pierre Léaud for Masculin Féminin
- Silver Bear Extraordinary Jury Prize:
  - The Chasers by Yngve Gamlin
  - No Shooting Time for Foxes by Peter Schamoni
- Special Recognition: Nayak by Satyajit Ray

== Independent Awards ==
=== Youth Film Award ===
- Best Short Film Suitable for Young People: High Steel by Don Owen
- Best Feature Film Suitable for Young People: Masculin Féminin by Jean-Luc Godard
  - Honorable Mention: Naked Hearts by Édouard Luntz

=== FIPRESCI Award ===
- Seasons of Our Love by Florestano Vancini
  - Honorable Mention: Max Ophüls

=== Interfilm Award ===
- Seasons of Our Love by Florestano Vancini
  - Honorable Mention: Masculin Féminin by Jean-Luc Godard

=== OCIC Award ===
- Georgy Girl by Silvio Narizzano

=== UNICRIT Award ===
- Nayak by Satyajit Ray
