= Richard Hobert =

Swedish film director (1951–2025)

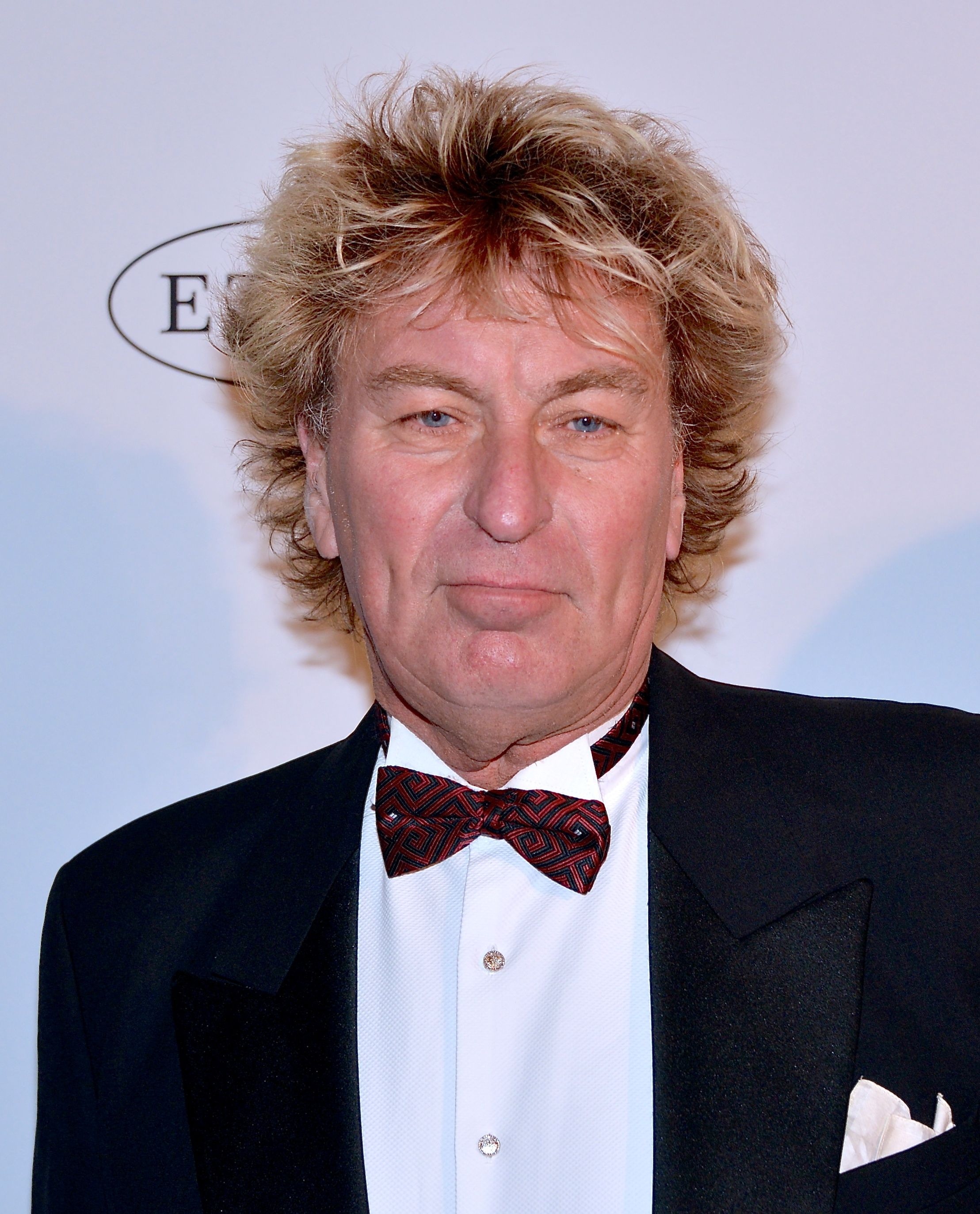
- Born: 1 December 1951; Kalmar, Sweden
- Died: 24 August 2025 (aged 73)
- Occupations: Scriptwriter; director
- Years active: 1969–2025
- Awards: Ingmar Bergman Award (1994); Den Spillende Faun (Lena Endre, 2005)

Richard Hobert (1 December 1951 – 24 August 2025) was a Swedish scriptwriter and film director. He is known especially for his 2002 film Everybody Loves Alice.

== Early life and education ==
Richard Hobert was born on 1 December 1951 in Kalmar, Sweden.

He studied political science, languages and film and theatre at Lund University from 1970 to 1973.

== Career ==
Hobert debuted as a radio playwright in 1974. Hobert worked as a writer and assistant director up to his debut as a director in 1978. During the eighties, he wrote and directed several TV-films, among them the internationally awarded The Twelve Months of Summer, Age Unknown and The Fifteenth Chieftain.

His debut on the big screen in 1993, Spring of Joy, was the first film in a cycle of seven, called "The Seven Deadly Sins". The stories were focused on the same Swedish family, ranging from comedy to drama and a thriller. He wrote, directed and co-produced the project during the nineties. Spring of Joy was awarded the Ingmar Bergman Prize. This film as well as the other films in the cycle: The Birthday Födelsedagen (2000); Where the Rainbow Ends Där regnbågen slutar (1999); "The Eye" Ögat (1998); Run for Your Life) (1997); Autumn in Paradise Höst i paradiset - Glädjekällan 2 (1995); and The Hands Händerna (1994) received Scandinavian and international awards.

In 2002, Everybody Loves Alice was a major critical and box office success. The film won the "Best European Film" award at the Hollywood Film Festival. "This powerful film is reminiscent in intensity and intimacy of Ingmar Bergman's gripping 1973 film Scenes from a Marriage (Hollywood Reporter).

His next film, Three Suns, a medieval love story, was considered a disappointment and was widely criticised. A year later, 2005, Hobert returned to the big screens with Harry's Daughters, starring Lena Endre and Amanda Ooms. The film, about the violent conflict between two sisters after the loss of a child, was generally received as a powerful comeback and praised as one of his best films ever. In the following years, Hobert wrote several theatre plays. He also directed one of them, Security, (USA: "Manhattan Security") at the Royal Dramatic Theatre in Stockholm.

In 2011 he once again returned to the cinema. He wrote and directed A One-Way to Antibes .The tragicomic drama, about a half-blind widower who learns that his children have conceived an elaborate plan to get their hands on his assets before he dies—and then does a counterattack—was a big critics' success and the actor Sven-Bertil Taube received a National Award for "Best Leading Male Actor" in January 2012. The film was also very successful in the theatres, running for seven months.

== Personal life and death ==
Hobert was married to actress Lena Endre from 2000 to 2012. He died on 24 August 2025, at the age of 73.

== Filmography ==
- "A One - Way to Antibes " (2011) "En Enkel Till Antibes"
- "Harry's Daughters" Harrys döttrar (2005)
- "Three Suns" Tre solar (2004)
- "Everyone loves Alice" Alla älskar Alice (2002)
- "The Birthday" Födelsedagen (2000)
- "Where the Rainbow Ends" Där regnbågen slutar (1999)
- "The Eye" Ögat (1998)
- Run for Your Life) (1997)
- "Autumn in Paradise" Höst i paradiset - Glädjekällan 2 (1995)
- "The Hands" Händerna (1994)
- "Spring of Joy" Glädjekällan (1993)
- "The Fifteenth Chieftain" Den femtonde hövdingen (TV) (1992)
- "Age Unknown" Ålder okänd (TV) (1991)
- "The Twelve Months of Summer" Sommarens tolv månader (TV) (1988)
- Skånska mord - Yngsjömordet (TV) (1986)
- Skånska mord - Esarparen (TV) (1986)
- Polskan och Puckelryggen (TV) (1983)
- Två slår den tredje (TV) (1981)
- Gänget (TV) (1978)
