= The Staffan Stolle Story =

1956 film

- Directed by: Hasse Ekman
- Written by: Hasse Ekman
- Produced by: Felix Alvo
- Starring: Povel Ramel
- Cinematography: Åke Dahlqvist
- Release date: 10 September 1956
- Running time: 107 minutes
- Country: Sweden
- Language: Swedish

The Staffan Stolle Story (Swedish: Ratataa eller The Staffan Stolle Story) is a 1956 Swedish musical comedy film directed by Hasse Ekman. The film was selected as the Swedish entry for the Best Foreign Language Film at the 29th Academy Awards, but was not accepted as a nominee. The film stars Povel Ramel in a leading role, and features many scenes where Ramel performs musical numbers.

== Cast ==
- Povel Ramel as Staffan Stolle
- Martin Ljung as Vicke Wickberg
- Gunwer Bergkvist as Tipsie Blink
- Yvonne Lombard as Charlotte Nibbing
- Hasse Ekman as Klad Traenger
- Sigge Fürst as Överste Nibbing
- Georg Funkquist as Fabiansson (as Georg Funkqvist)
- Siv Ericks as Fröken Lefverhielm
- Stig Järrel as Ulf Christer Lefverhielm
- Oscar Rundqvist as Sjungande badare

== See also ==
- List of submissions to the 29th Academy Awards for Best Foreign Language Film
- List of Swedish submissions for the Academy Award for Best Foreign Language Film
