= Yngve Gamlin =

Swedish actor

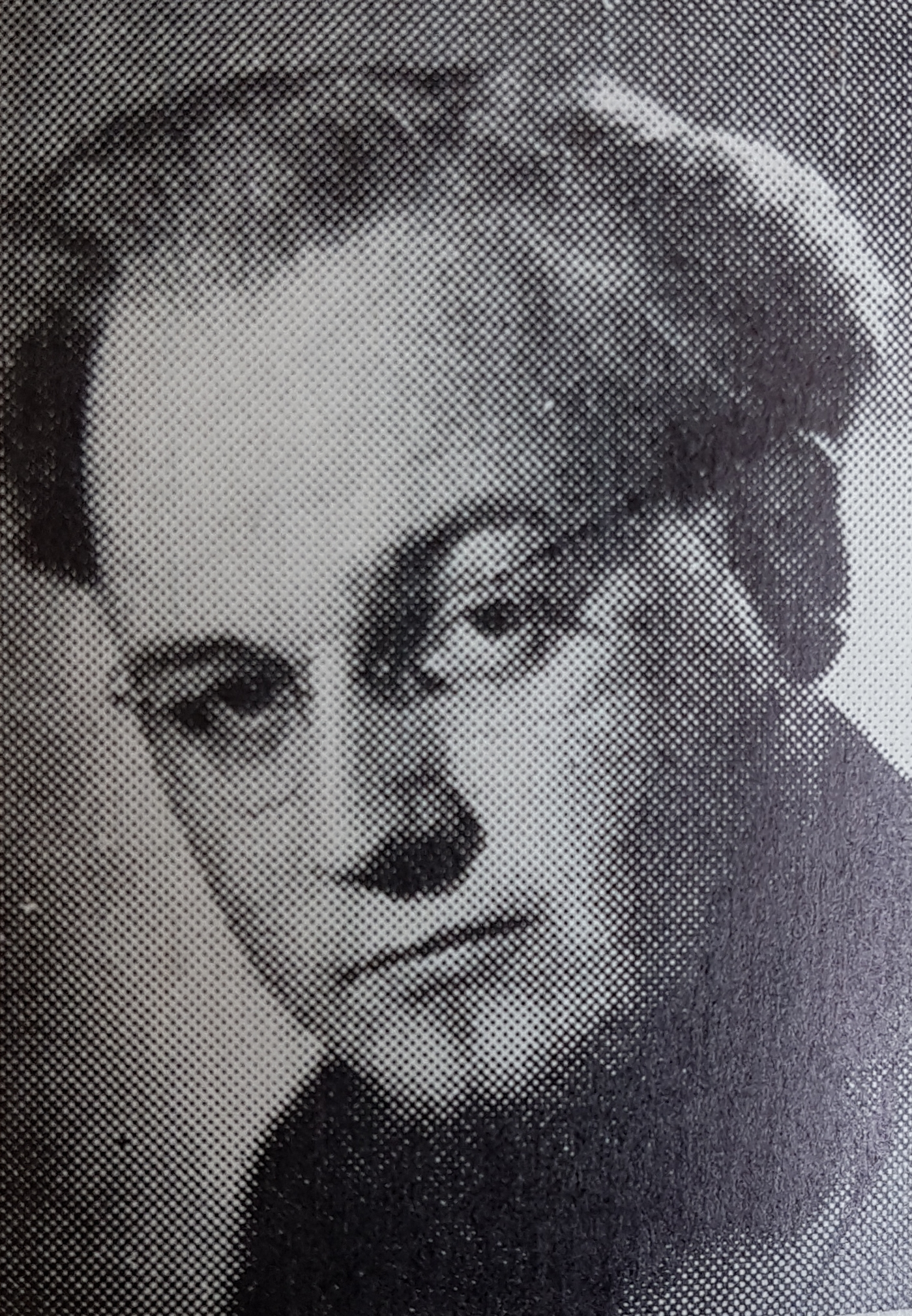

President of the Republic of Jamtland
- In office 1963–1983
- Preceded by: Office established
- Succeeded by: Moltas Erikson

Personal details
- Born: 17 March 1926 Strömsund, Sweden
- Died: 1 February 1995 (aged 68) Stockholm, Sweden
- Occupation: Actor, film director

Yngve Gamlin (17 March 1926 – 1 February 1995) was a Swedish actor and film director. His 1965 film The Chasers was entered into the 16th Berlin International Film Festival where it won the Silver Bear Extraordinary Jury Prize.

Gamlin was also President of the humorous micronation the Republic of Jamtland from 1963 to 1983.

== Filmography ==
Year	Title	Role	Notes
1953	I dur och skur	Magnus, theater painter	(scenes deleted)
1954	Dance in the Smoke	Gusten II	
1956	The Staffan Stolle Story	Olja Schlaskokowitsch	
1958	The Great Amateur	Mayor Lilja	
1959	Fröken Chic	Gårdvar	
1959	Sköna Susanna och gubbarna	Vicar	
1960	Summer and Sinners	Prof. Cornelius	
1962	Ticket to Paradise	Italian Violinist	
1965	The Chasers		Director
1968	Badarna		Director
1978	The Adventures of Picasso	Djagilev	
1980	Barna från Blåsjöfjället	Governor	
