= Povel Ramel =

Swedish entertainer

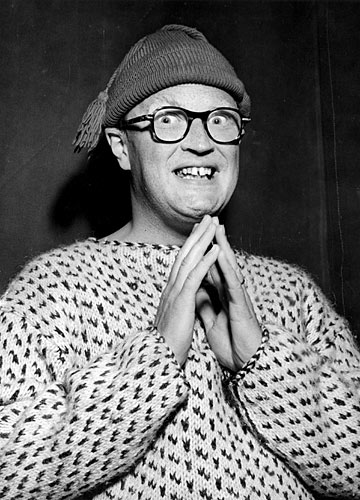
- Ramel in 1955

Background information
- Born: Baron Povel Karl Henrik Ramel; 1 June 1922; Stockholm, Sweden
- Died: 5 June 2007 (aged 85) Lidingö, Sweden
- Genre: Vaudeville
- Occupations: Singer, musician, writer
- Instruments: Vocals, piano
- Years active: 1939–2007
- Label: Pygmé Musikförlag

Baron Povel Karl Henric Ramel (Swedish pronunciation: [ˈpǒːvɛl ˈrǎmːɛl]; 1 June 1922 – 5 June 2007) was a Swedish entertainer. Ramel was a singer, pianist, vaudeville artist, author and a novelty song composer. His style was characterized by imaginative wit, both verbal and musical. He took inspiration from US and UK 'crazy' style humor and created his own personal Swedish version, unusual combinations of lyrics and music, word play, pastiche and general unexpectedness. He wrote approximately 1700 songs, skits and monologues, and he is regarded as a legend and an institution in Swedish entertainment.

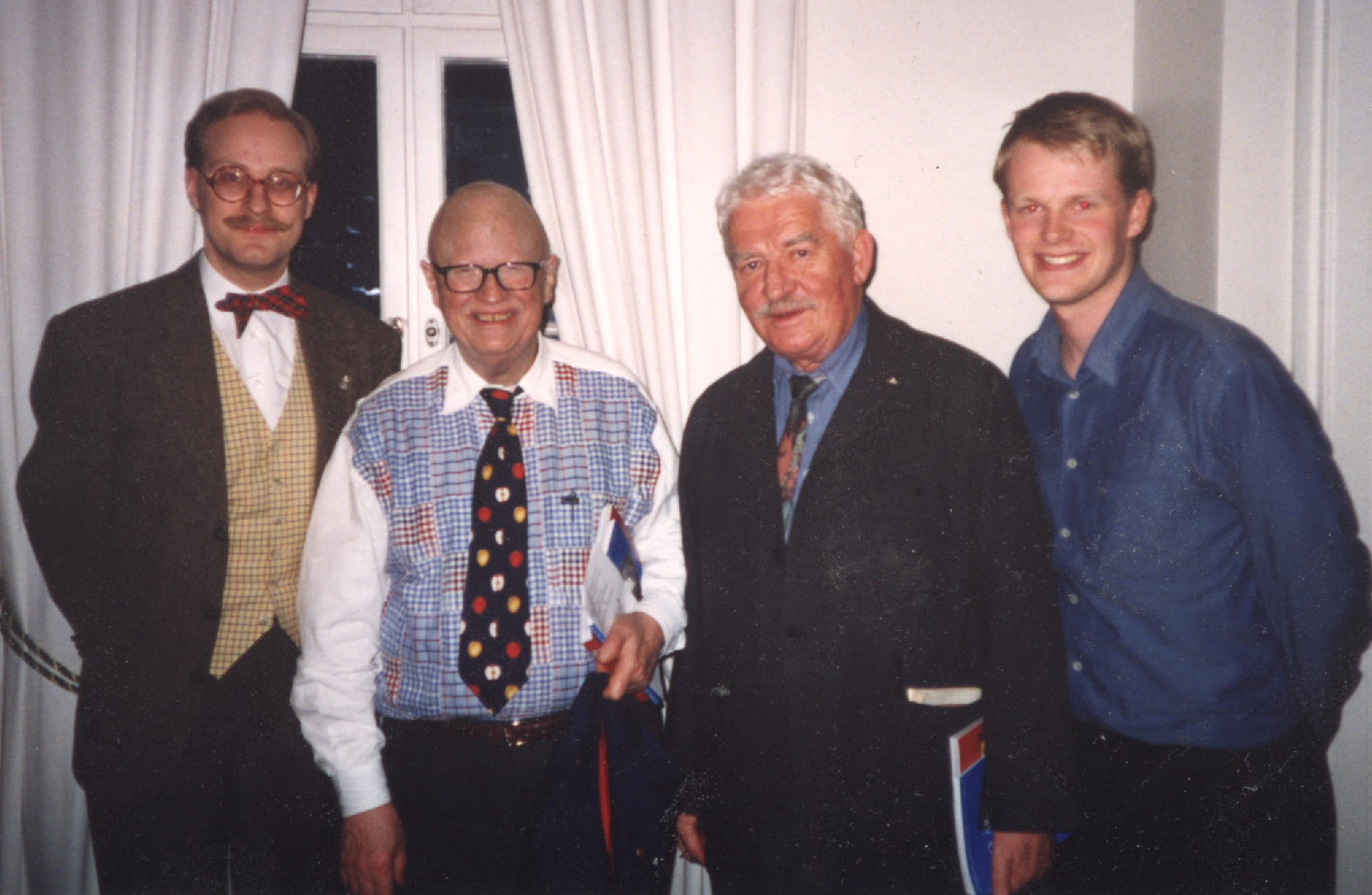
Povel Ramel (second from left) and Hans Alfredson (second from right) being hosted by a student association at Lund University in 1999

== Early life ==
Povel Ramel was born in Östermalm, Stockholm into an affluent noble family. His father, Karl Ramel, was a lawyer. At a young age, Ramel found a loving audience for his talents in the family nurses, maids and cooks, and also his parents. His family often went on extensive holidays, and on such an occasion, on a beach in Belgium, when Povel was two years old he stepped on a nail. With the wound infected Povel was not expected to survive, although he recovered, with a slight permanent injury.

Ramel's school-life was troubled. He cut classes, often going to Skansen, an open-air museum and zoo, favouring their monkey house. To avoid getting into trouble, Ramel told his teachers that he had lost his attendance book, thereby getting a new one, while showing his parents the old one, free from absence remarks. However, one day his father spotted Ramel visiting the monkey house. Subsequently, his father tried sending Ramel to various schools, but with little success.

At the age of 15, Ramel accompanied his parents on a car trip. There was a collision and Ramel's mother, Märta Tesch, died the following day in hospital. His father died a few months later.

== Career ==
After his parents' death, Ramel was raised by his paternal aunt, who recognised his artistic potential. He went to art school, but his infatuation with painting did not last. However, he developed a love for playing the piano and for words, as he became inspired by musicians such as Bing Crosby, Fats Waller, British trumpeter Nat Gonella, Spike Jones and British dance band leader Harry Roy. Entering Aftonbladet's talent hunt, Vi som vill opp in 1939, Ramel sang and yawned his own composition, "En sömnig serenad" ("A Sleepy Serenade"). By this time Ramel was already a prolific songwriter. His aunt wrote the lyrics to one of his songs, "En vår utan dig" ("A Spring Without You"), which he recorded. Ramel's lyrics are noted for their humor and dramatic wordplay. Musically he was able to adopt styles from most types of music for his own purposes.

Later, when called to do his military service, his foot condition kept him out of active duty, and he was given an administrative role. When studying the military code, he learned that most everything was forbidden. But, with no rules to be found against Boogie Woogie Waltzes, he dutifully wrote Johanssons boogie-woogie-vals, the song that was later to become his first hit.

STIM (a musical copyright agency) required the record have a label, banning its airplay. As a result, the sales were minimal. Then a friend at the record company sent a copy with the label pulled off to Radiotjänst (The Swedish Broadcasting Corporation), and the sales jumped. Ramel was hired by Radiotjänst in 1945, which ushered in a new era of radio entertainment. With several series of innovative radio shows featuring the crazy style of humor, he became a household name in Sweden.

=== Knäppupp ===
In 1952, Ramel and Felix Alvo started the Knäppupp AB (Unbutton Inc.) company. The Knäppupp vaudeville shows were popular with Swedish audiences. His first vaudeville show was "Akta Huvet" ("Mind Your Head") and Ramel made his entrance hanging from a cable over the auditorium. The show opened at the Cirkus theatre in Gothenburg in 1952. Knäppupp AB also produced a number of movies, such as Ratataa in 1956. Ramel had several pub shows such as, "Karamelodier". "Karamelodier" is one of Ramel's typical puns, as the word karamelodier is a combination of the words "karamell" (bon-bon), "Ramel" and "melodier" (melodies).

=== Some of his most famous songs ===
Ramel made somewhere around 900 songs in total Here is a list of his more famous ones:

- Johanssons boogie woogie vals (Johansson's Boogie Woogie Waltz)
- Måste vägen till Curaçao gynga så (Why must the Boat to Curaçao sway like this)

Gynga is a broken Swedish version of Gunga (Swing/Sway)
This song was written by Povel on the M/S San Blas, in a storm, and sung at the stage in San Blas later.

- Lingonben (Lingonberry legs)
- Släkt-huset (The Family House, mocking "the old family fam" theme)
- Högt uppe på berget (High up on the Mountain)

Swedish version of On Top of Old Smoky

- Far, jag kan inte få upp min kokosnöt (Daddy, I Can't Break Open my Coconut)

Swedish version of I've Got a Lovely Bunch of Coconuts, featured in My Life as a Dog

- Skratt (Laughs)

Presented with some "laughing types" as the engineer's laugh "Hoho hooooooooo" (Like a steam whistle), "ping-pong laugh" Ha-ha-ha-ha-ha-ha

- Underbart är kort (Wonderful is short), one of the few Ramel songs that are purely romantic
- Nya Skrytvalsen (The New Bragging Waltz)
- Tjo va de va livat i holken i lördags (Whoopee Whatta Bustle in the Nesting Box last Saturday)
- Naturbarn (Children of Nature)
- En strut karameller (A cone of caramels)
- En kaka pemmikan (A slice of pemmican)
- Är det nån som har en våning åt mej? (Anyone Got an Apartment for me?)
- Sorglösa brunn (Carefree Spa, a play based on his time in "Källviks brunn" in Loftahammar)
- Varför är där ingen is till punschen? (Why no Ice with the Punsch?, mocking the "good old days" theme)
- De sista entusiasterna (The Last Enthusiasts)
- Karl Nilsson
- Det skulle aldrig delfinerna göra (That, the Dolphins Would Never do)

A song about the fact that no dolphin would ever become a singer, as they are (as sung by Ramel) all too smart.

- Jag diggar dig (I dig you)

Anticipating rap music.

- Köp inte en zebra! (Don't buy a zebra!)
- While he almost exclusively worked in Swedish, he has written at least one song in English, "The Sukiyaki Syndrome", about a visit to a Japanese restaurant, and others with a brief English introduction such as "Birth of the Gammeldans".

=== Later years ===
While he wasn't much of an active dubber, he did at one point voice Professor Archimedes Q. Porter in the Swedish dub of Disney's Tarzan from 1999.

== Karamelodiktstipendiet ==
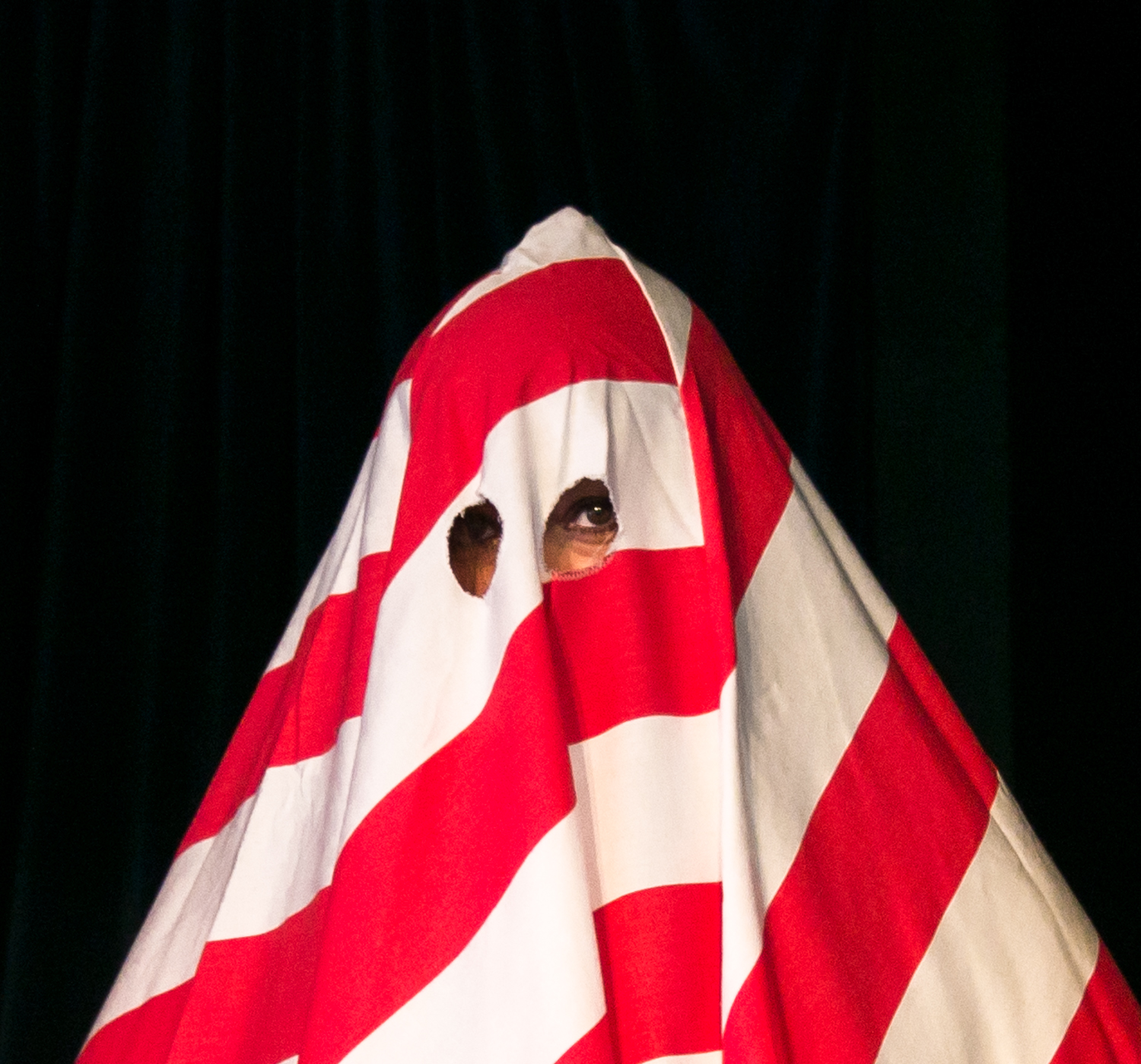
Karamelodiktstipendiet recipient, before their identity has been revealed

In 1982, in connection with his 60th birthday, Ramel founded Karamelodiktstipendiet, an award given annually to a Swedish entertainer or group of entertainers, known for inventiveness and renewal in their use of Swedish, or for important musical contributions. Ramel personally selected the recipient each year; after his death, a jury led by his daughter Lotta makes the selection. The name of the prize is a pun on karamell (piece of candy) and Ramel, melodi (melody), and dikt (poem or inventive story). The award itself consists of a paper cone filled with sweets, which alludes to one of Ramel's songs, a diploma, and a sum of money which is "sufficient to make the recipient financially independent, at least for the rest of the day". As of 2014, the prize sum was 20,000 SEK.

The prize ceremony is held at the beginning of June each year, and it was led by Povel Ramel until 2007, when he was unable to attend due to his failing health; he died on the following day from a heart disease. From 2007 onwards, it has been hosted by Ramel's children Mikael and Lotta. The awardee is led onto the scene of the venue covered by a sheet striped in red and white (an allusion to a polkagris, a form of peppermint rock), which is removed as the identity of the recipient is revealed through a poem written for the occasion.

Holders:

- 2020 (ceremony postponed until 2021 due to the Covid-19 pandemic) – Bengan Janson
- 2019 – Suzanne Reuter
- 2018 – Felix Herngren
- 2017 – Lisa Nilsson
- 2016 – Per Andersson
- 2015 – Niklas Strömstedt
- 2014 – Kristina Lugn
- 2013 – Carl-Einar Häckner
- 2012 – Eva Rydberg
- 2011 – Johan Glans
- 2010 – Maria Lundqvist
- 2009 – Johan Ulveson
- 2008 – Babben Larsson
- 2007 – Henrik Dorsin
- 2006 – Kalle Moraeus from Orsa Spelmän
- 2005 – Sissela Kyle
- 2004 – Lena Philipsson
- 2003 – Peter Carlsson
- 2002 – The Real Group
- 2001 – Fredrik Lindström
- 2000 – Robin Carlsson (Robyn)
- 1999 – Viba femba
- 1998 – Hannes Holm and Måns Herngren
- 1997 – Wille Crafoord
- 1996 – Louise Hoffsten
- 1995 – Peter Dalle
- 1994 – I manegen med Glenn Killing
- 1993 – Marie Bergman
- 1992 – Tomas von Brömssen
- 1991 – Magnus Uggla
- 1990 – Ulla Skoog
- 1989 – Robert Broberg
- 1988 – Ainbusk
- 1987 – Claes Eriksson
- 1986 – Mikael Ramel
- 1985 – Anne-Lie Rydé
- 1984 – Björn Skifs
- 1983 – Totte Wallin

== Bibliography ==
Povel Ramel wrote a number of books, his first in 1945, though his main focus was always on his music. Here is a list of his books (not including the many book of lyrics that he published):

=== Från Asar till Wasar ===
- (From Asar to the House of Vasa), 1945.

In this book, Ramel presents himself as an 'eternity-human', born in the ice age. He describes the history of Sweden "as it was" from the old Norse "Asar"-gods to Gustav Vasa. He also has some 'eternity-friends' and an 'eternity-dog' called Missräkningen (The miscalculation).

=== Min galna hage ===
- (My Looney Pasture), 1957.

Ramel's pasture is said to have corners. 5 of them. It is a crazy pasture.

This book has sections, called corners. These are:

- Poetiska hörnet (The poetry corner)
- * Poems written by a fictional lady called Ewa Sophi Drömmington
- De smås hörn (The tiny ones' corner)
- * Some stories about Little Huno and his 36 siblings, for example Lille Päron (Little Pear) whom all the siblings used to hit because he liked it
- Blandade Hörnet (The mixed corner)
- * Includes a part from Från Asar till Wasar and some other mixed writings.
- Makabra Hörnet (The macabre corner)
- * Among others, a story about a girl who loved the colours black and red, and therefore bit her own family to see red blood.
- * * Povel wrote here: 'Don't read this if you already doubt my mental sanity!'
- Helraspiga hörnet (Completely crazy corner)
- * Stories Den trasiga middagen (The broken dinner), about Det Lilla Polki (The Little Polki) Far och Pappa (Father and Dad) and some other strange characters such as Onkel Zebraton från Afrika (Uncle Zebraton from Africa), Farbror Flicka (Uncle Girl) and Bästekock Lortig (Best-cook Dirty), whom after the third time slipped on a ratshell and became lying and stopping potatoes.
- * * This corner also includes a dictionary with strange definitions of words

=== Knäppupplevelser ===
- (Knäppupp experiences, the upp is used both for Knäppupp and Upplevelser), 1976

This book is about the time of Knäppupp. It came with a vinyl album with the same name, and is really hard to find today.

=== Lingonben ===
- (Lingonberry legs), 1978.

This is a lyric book with some famous songs (like Naturnbarn, and Johansson's boogie woogie vals) and some less well known songs by Ramel (As Balladen Om Kung Styggfrid {The Ballad about King Wickedfrid})

=== Tänk dej en strut karameller ===
- (Imagine a cone of bon-bons), 1981

With sheet music to many of Ramel's most popular songs. The title is also the title of one of Ramel's songs.

=== Min ordkynniga penna ===
- (My word-capricious pen), 1987.

This includes some random poems and writings of Ramel, as "How to Convince an American Businessman"

=== Vanliga palsternackan för gottegrisar ===
- (The ordinary parsnip for sweet teeth)

Vanliga palsternackan is a play on the famous Swedish almanac, Vanliga Almanackan (The ordinary almanac) It includes some strange ideas such as a list of kings who died from overeating (with space to keep the list up-to-date) This book was co-written with Hans Alfredson

=== Följ mej bakåt vägen, Povels Livs-stycken del 1 ===
- (Walk with me back along the road, Ramel's "life-parts" part 1), 1992.

This begins with Ramel's youth and ends when he married his wife in 1949. He describes many things of his life, such as when he, as a child, cut big holes in his clothes, to find out what it was like to be poor! Ramel choose to not call the book his 'memoarer' (memoirs), as that would sound too boring! "Följ mej bakåt vägen" is also a title of one of Ramel's songs.

=== Förflerade Lingonben ===
- Increased Lingonberry legs), 1992

This is a longer edition of Lingonben with some well-known and less well known unknown songs.

It has been reprinted many times, most recently in 1997.

=== Som om inget hade hänt, Povels Livs-stycken del 2 ===
- (As if nothing had happened, Povel's "life-parts" part 2), 1999

This is Ramel's 'life-parts' part two, including the Knäppupp years, which includes a section from the book Knäppupplevelser.

=== Djur I Dur ===
- (Animals in major key), 2001

This book includes a CD and sheet music to some new and some old songs about animals. especially those poor animals that never had a song written about them, such as Acke Asgam (Acke Carrion Vulture), Gary Gråsugga (Gary Isopoda) and Tvigge Tvestjärt (Tvigge Earwig) who crawled far into grannie's ear.

== The Knäppupps ==
- 1952 – Knäppupp 1: Akta Huvet (This means both 'watch out for your head' and 'mind your head'. It was because Ramel entered the show on a cable over the crowd in Circus in Gothenburg, crying "Watch Out! Here comes Grandfather!")
- 1953 – Djuprevyn: 2 meter (The deep-vaudeville, 2 metre)
- 1954–55 – Knäppupp 2: Denna sida upp (This side up)
- 1955–56 – Spectacle
- 1956–67 – Knäppupp 3: Tillstymmelser (Suggestions)
- 1958–59 – Funny Boy
- 1960–61 – Alla 4 (All 4) [The summer version was called Semestersångarna (The vacation singers)]
- 1961–62 – I hatt och strumpa (Wearing a hat and a sock)
- 1962–63 – Dax igen (It's time again)
- 1963–64 – Ryck mej i snöret (Pull my string)
- 1964–65 – Ta av dej skorna (Take your shoes off)
- 1966–67 – På avigan (The wrong way around)
- 1968 – De sista entusiasterna (The last enthusiasts)

== Other revues ==
The year of the opening is listed. Normally the revues stayed in production for two years, but, for example, Pratstund med Povel only stayed 1 year.

- 1969 – The POW-Show I (Pow = Povel och Wenche {Povel and Wenche})
- 1971 – Vid Pianot P. Ramel (At the Piano P. Ramel)
- 1972 – Karamellodier (Karamell = Caramel/Candy. Ramel = Ramel. Melodier = Melodies.)
- 1973 – Povel på Berns (Povel at Berns)
- 1974 – The POW-Show II, Andra Varvet Runt (The second round around)
- 1979 – Povel på Maxim (Povel at Maxim)
- 1981 – Minspiration (Min = My. Inspiration = Inspiration.)
- 1984 – Povel på Berns 2, The Sukiyaki Syndrome.
- 1989 – Tingel Tangel på Tyrol (Tinsel and Glitter at Tyrol), with Margaretha Krook and Hans Alfredson
- 1991 – Återbesök i Holket (Re-visit in the birdhouse)
- 1992 – Knäpp Igen (Re-Button or Crazy Again)
- * Knäpp can mean Crazy or button!
- 1996 – Kolla Klotet (Look the Earth!) with Tomas von Brömssen
- 2000 – Som om inget hade hänt (As if nothing had happened), with Wenche Myhre and Putte Wickman
- 2001 – Ramelodia Lusticana
- 2003 – Some like it i höet (Höet = the hay) (With Lasse Brandeby, Maria Lundqvist and Lill-Babs)
- 2004 – Pratstund med Povel (Chat with Povel)
- 2005 – Förnyad Povelpratstund, nu med musik! (Renewed Povel-chat, now with music!)
- 2006 and spring 2007 – Povel à la carte

== Select filmography ==
- I dur och skur (A pun on the expression 'I ur och skur', meaning 'through all kinds of weather' and more or less corresponding to the English expression 'through thick and thin'. Dur is the Swedish word for Major musical key.) 1953
- I rök och dans (In smoke and dance) 1954 (Wordplay on 'Smoke and Dust')
- In 1955 he was supposed to make Afrikafilmen (The Africa Movie), and some scenes were recorded, for example one where Ramel and Yngve Gamlin are riding a hippopotamus. War broke out in the country, so he never completed the film.
- Hoppsan! (Whoops!) 1955
- Ratataa eller Staffan Stolle Story (Ratataa or Staffan Stolle Story). (Staffan Stalledräng is a famous Swedish Christmas song, "stolle" means fool) 1956.
- The Great Amateur (1958)

== Radio Shows ==
- 1946 – Föreningen för flugighetens främjande (The society for promotion of flyism)
- 1949 – Jakten på Johan Blöth (The hunt for John Wet) – "Blöth" is an older form of the word "blöt", meaning wet
- 1950 – Herr Hålms öden och Angantyr (Mister Hålms [pronounced Holmes] fate and Angantyr)
- * Öden och Angantyr is a play on the often used Öden och Äventyr (Fates and Adventures)
- 1953 – Rameldags (Ramel-Time)
- * Probably a play on gammaldags, meaning old-fashioned
- 1955 – När Schlagern dog (When the Schlager died)

== Television ==
- 1965 – Ramel I Rutan (Ramel on the Screen)
- 1977 – Semlons gröna dalar (The green valleys of Semlon)
- 1986 – Affären Ramel (has the dual meaning of "The Ramel Shop" and "The Ramel Affair")

== Povel Ramel at Allsång på Skansen ==
At Allsång på Skansen, on 27 of June 2006, Povel sang many of his well-known songs to a melody of a different well-known song. A quite uncommon way of rendering old songs.

The whole song (preceded by a version of Side by side performed by Povel on piano) may be heard at Sveriges Television's webpage here. The recording lasts 9 minutes 41 seconds.
