= Who Do You Think You Are =

Who Do You Think You Are may refer to:

== Television series ==
- Who Do You Think You Are? (British TV series), a genealogy documentary with many adaptations:
  - Who Do You Think You Are? (American TV series)
  - Who Do You Think You Are? (Australian TV series)
  - Who Do You Think You Are? (Canadian TV series)
  - Who Do You Think You Are? (Irish TV series)
  - Ved du hvem du er?, Danish adaptation
  - Hvem tror du at du er?, Norwegian adaption
  - Vem tror du att du är?, Swedish adaptation
- Who Do You Think You Are? (1976 Australian TV series), an Australian comedy series

== Music ==
- "Who Do You Think You Are" (Candlewick Green song), 1973; covered by Bo Donaldson and The Heywoods (1974), Saint Etienne (1993), and others
- "Who Do You Think You Are" (Colette Carr song), 2013
- "Who Do You Think You Are" (Collette song), 1990
- "Who Do You Think You Are" (Kim Wilde song), 1992
- "Who Do You Think You Are" (Spice Girls song), 1997
- Who Do You Think You Are, a 2007 album by Dala, and its title track
- "Who Do You Think You Are", a song by Angus & Julia Stone from Snow, 2017
- "Who Do You Think You Are?", a song by Cascada from Perfect Day, 2007
- "Who Do You Think You Are?", a song by Gamma Ray from Heaven Can Wait, 1990
- "Who Do You Think You Are?", a song by Gentle Giant from The Missing Piece, 1977
- "Who Do You Think You Are?", a song by Paco from This Is Where We Live, 2004
- "Who Do You Think You Are?", a song by S Club from Seeing Double, 2002

== Books ==
- Who Do You Think You Are?, a 1976 collection of short stories by Malcolm Bradbury
- Who Do You Think You Are? (book), a 1978 collection of short stories by Alice Munro

== Other uses ==
- Who Do You Think You Are Live?, a family history conference held annually in London
- Who Do You Think You Are? (Friday Night Lights), an episode of the TV series Friday Night Lights
- "Who Do You Think You Are?" (Ghosts), 2019 TV episode
- "Who Do You Think You Are?", an episode from the 2008 season of This American Life

== See also ==
- "Jar of Hearts", a 2010 single by Christina Perri whose chorus starts and ends with "Who do you think you are?"
