= Christine Neubauer =

German actress, writer

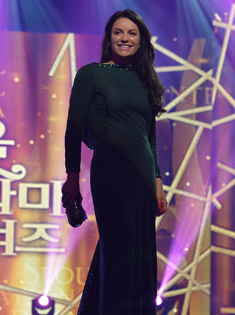
- Seoul International Drama Awards 2012 in Korea
- Born: 24 June 1962 (age 64); Munich, West Germany
- Occupations: actress, author

Christine Neubauer (born 24 June 1962 in Munich) is a German actress and author.

== Life and work ==
=== Background and education ===
Christine Neubauer is the daughter of a printer. Her ancestors came from Munich, Lower Bavaria and Swabia. She attended Mary Ward Secondary School in Nymphenburg and graduated in 1978 with an intermediate certificate. She studied psychology for two semesters and then took acting lessons. She attended the Lee Strasberg Theatre and Film Institute in New York. In the early 1980s she was engaged at the Munich Volkstheater and the Theater der Jugend.

=== Film and television ===
After her television debut as the mother of a missing baby in the series The Andro-Jäger (1984) Neubauer made her film debut in the film Knock on the Wrong Door. After she had been involved in other television films in small roles, she earned wide recognition in 1987 in the television series Löwengrube.

In 1992 she won an award for her portrayal of Traudl Grandauer.

On 14 April 2008, she explored her family history in an episode of Das Geheimnis meiner Familie, the German adaptation of the UK TV series Who Do You Think You Are?.

Besides her work as an actress Neubauer made a name as an author of books.

=== Private life ===
Neubauer married her childhood sweetheart Lambert Dinzinger, a sports journalist and presenter at the Bayerischer Rundfunk. They have a son (born 1992), who played a supporting role in Neubauer's film Eva Zacharias in 2004. Even after announcing their separation in January 2011 the couple lived together in Pullach. In November 2011, Neubauer filed for divorce, which took place in November, 2014. Since mid-2012, she is in a relationship with the Chilean photographer José Campos.

== Social engagement ==
Since 2007, Christine Neubauer committed to the children's charity Save the Children. In addition, she was appointed in October 2007 to the Ambassador of the German Red Cross. She is also a mentor of LILALU and committed to Plan International.

== Filmography ==
- 1984: Knock on the Wrong Door
- 1984: Wie im Paradies oder Ein gnadenloser Tag im Leben des Alois B.
- 1984: Der Alte
- 1984: Polizeiinspektion 1 – Zwei Furchen auf dem Sonnenberg
- 1985: Sailor Beware!
- 1986: Prämienkind
- 1986: Stinkwut
- 1986: Der Unfried
- 1987: Smaragd
- 1987: Taxi nach Kairo
- 1987: Korkmazlar
- 1988: Der Rosenhain
- 1989: Otto: The Alien from East Frisia
- 1989: Der neue Mann
- 1989: Löwengrube – Die Grandauers und ihre Zeit (TV series)
- 1991: Abgetrieben
- 1991: Dido – Das Geheimnis des Fisches (TV series)
- 1992: Forsthaus Falkenau (TV series)
- 1992: Ein Fall für TKKG: Drachenauge
- 1993: At the Edge of Paradise
- 1994: Robert darf nicht sterben
- 1994: Kommissar Rex – Ein perfekter Mord
- 1995: Der Mann, der Angst vor Frauen hatte
- 1995: Knallhart daneben
- 1995: Mordanklage ohne Leiche
- 1996: Alle für die Mafia
- 1996: Gestohlenes Mutterglück
- 1996: Rex – Die frühen Jahre
- 1997: Baby Rex – Der kleine Kommissar
- 1997: Liebling Kreuzberg – Unter uns Machos
- 1997: Weihnachten mit Willy Wuff – Mama braucht einen Millionär
- 1997: Mali
- 1997: Die unerwünschte Zeugin
- 1997: König auf Mallorca
- 1997: Du hast mir meine Familie geraubt
- 1998: Krambambuli
- 1998: Liebe mich bis in den Tod
- 1998: Gefährliche Hochzeit
- 1998: The Devil and Ms. D
- 1998: Die Kinderklinik
- 1998: Ich bin kein Mann für eine Frau
- 1998: Papa, ich hol dich raus
- 1999: Der Kapitän
- 1999: Fresh Produce
- 1999: Pain au chocolat – Chocolate Pain
- 2000: Altweibersommer
- 2000: Preis der Schönheit
- 2000: Einmal Himmel und retour
- 2001: Tatort – Böses Blut
- 2001: Men Are Dispensable
- 2001: Kleeblatt küsst Kaktus
- 2001: Auf immer und ewig
- 2001: Mein Vater und andere Betrüger
- 2001: Verdammt verliebt
- 2001: Schloss Einstein
- 2001: Abschnitt 40
- 2002: A Two-Time Woman
- 2002: Die Rosenheim-Cops – Hopfen und Malz
- 2002: Complete Woman Needs Half-Time-Man
- 2002: Die Rettungsflieger
- 2002: Trenck
- 2002: SOKO 5113
- 2002: More Ants in the Pants
- 2002: Abschnitt 40
- 2003: Tochter meines Herzens
- 2003: Trade Office for Household
- 2003: Für alle Fälle Mama – Glück auf halber Treppe
- 2003: Liebe Zartbitter
- 2003: Pumuckl und sein Zirkusabenteuer
- 2004–2008: In the Valley of Silence (TV series, 4 episodes)
- 2004: Eva Zacharias
- 2004–2005: Unter weißen Segeln (3 episodes)
- 2004–2012: München 7 (TV series, 13 episodes)
- 2004: Weißblaue Wintergeschichten
- 2004: My Brother Is a Dog
- 2005: The Chocolate Queen
- 2005: The Vulture Wally
- 2005–2013: Die Landärztin (TV series, 10 episodes)
- 2005: A Christmoose Carol
- 2005: The Best Year of My Life
- 2005: Lauras Wunschzettel
- 2005: Happiness on the Staircase
- 2005: Follow Your Heart
- 2006: Momella: A Farm in Africa
- 2006: The Wife of the Returnee
- 2006: Forever Africa
- 2006: At the End of the Silence
- 2007: Chubby Me
- 2007: Africa in the Heart
- 2007: The Harvest Helper
- 2007: Lost Child 312
- 2008: Island of Light
- 2008: Das zweite Leben
- 2008: Loyalty Points
- 2008: Der Nikolaus im Haus
- 2008: Tischlein deck dich
- 2009: Cry No More
- 2009: All the Longing in the World
- 2009: Meringue Kisses
- 2009: The Great Lie
- 2009: Meine Heimat Afrika
- 2010: Who Dares to Love
- 2010: Stop the World
- 2010: Love Under Construction
- 2010: Wie ein Stern am Himmel
- 2010: A Summer on Sylt
- 2010: Pius XII: Under the Roman Sky
- 2010: Gurbet – Fremde Heimat
- 2011: The Cold Sky
- 2011: The Mine Sweeper
- 2011: God's Mighty Servant
- 2011: Das Mädchen aus dem Regenwald
- 2012: Kennen Sie Ihren Liebhaber?
- 2012: Hanna's Decision
- 2012: When It's Hot, at Least It's Not Cold
- 2012: Mein verrücktes Jahr in Bangkok
- 2012: The Wood Baroness
- 2013: Das Traumhotel – Myanmar
- 2013: The Pastor
- 2013: Bella und der Feigenbaum
- 2013: Heroes
- 2014: Letters from Santiago
- 2015: Franziska's World

== Works ==
- Das Vollweib-Kochbuch: Schlemmen ohne Reue – Meine Lieblingsrezepte. Knaur, München 2004, ISBN 978-3-426-64113-2.
- Die Vollweib-Diät. Mein Weg zur Wohlfühl-Figur. Knaur, München 2004, ISBN 978-3-426-77689-6.
- Das Vollweib-Training: Meine Workouts für eine Wohlfühl-Figur. Knaur, München 2005, ISBN 978-3-426-77773-2.
- Vollweib pur! Mein 4-Wochen-Programm. Knaur-Ratgeber-Verlag, München 2006, ISBN 978-3-426-64366-2.
- Vollweib-Beauty: Mein Weg zu einer attraktiven Ausstrahlung. Knaur-Taschenbuch-Verlag, München 2006, ISBN 978-3-426-77842-5.
- Die Memoiren der Fanny Hill. (Hörbuch mit John Cleland). Oskar Verlag, München 2006, ISBN 978-3-938389-17-1.
- Das Leben ist jo-jo: Meine Wohlfühlgeheimnisse. Rütten & Loening, Berlin 2012, ISBN 978-3-352-00837-5.
- Weight Watchers. Mein Genießerkochbuch Büchlein – Christine Neubauer Freundschaftsedition. Weight Watchers, 2012.

== Awards ==
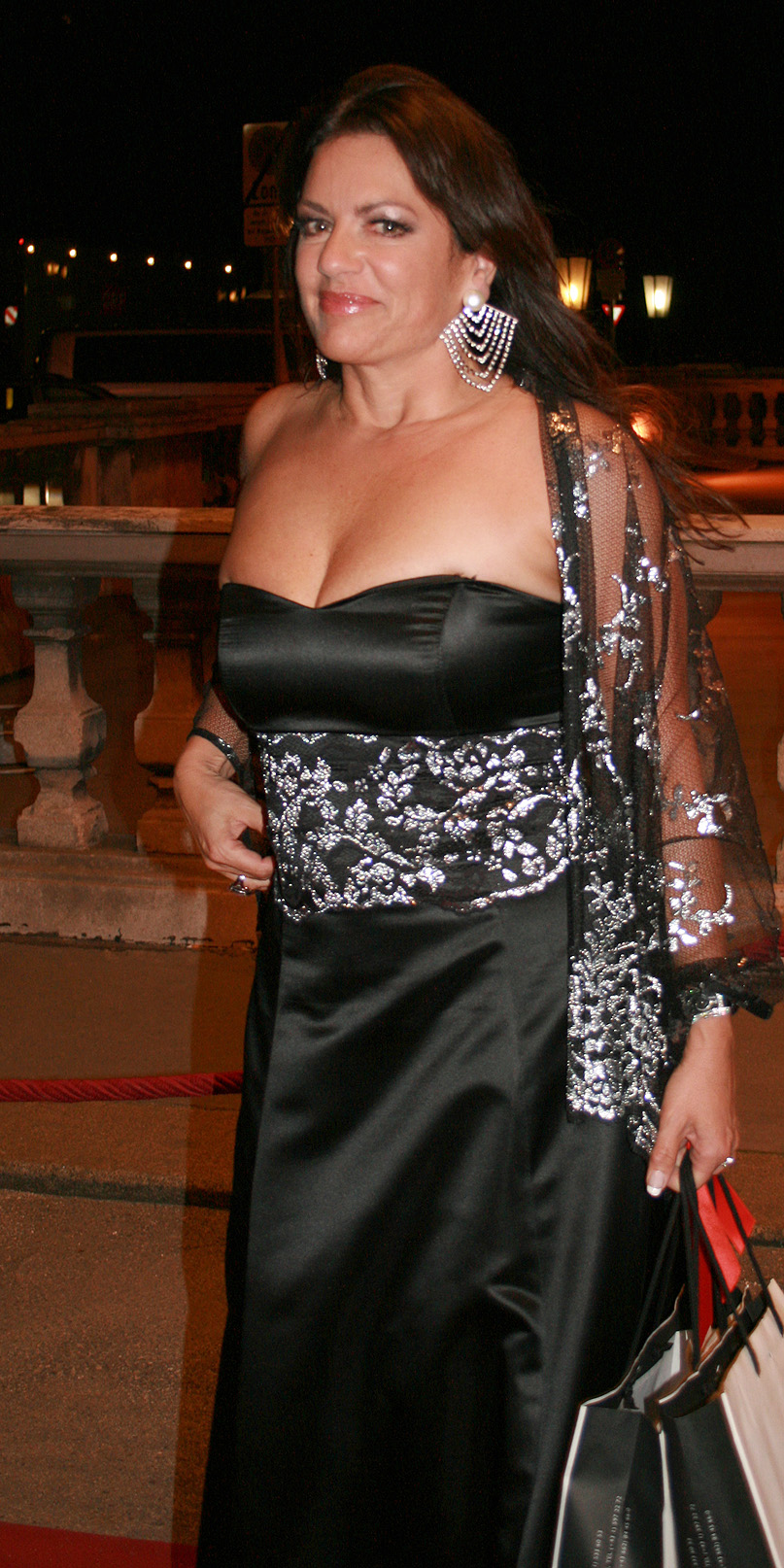
Neubauer at the Romy TV awards in 2008 in Wien

- 1992: Adolf-Grimme-Preis in Gold for Löwengrube
- 1996: Telestar "Best actress in a tv series" for Solange es die Liebe gibt
- 1999: Adolf-Grimme-Preis for Krambambuli
- 2000: Bavari Awards for Frische Ware
- 2002: Pro meritis scientiae et litterarum
- 2002: Bayerischer Poetentaler
- 2006: Golden Romy award for most popular actress
- 2007: Bavarian Order of Merit
- 2008: Romy TV award for most popular actress
- 2008: Bambi Award in the category "TV"
- 2012: Monte-Carlo Television Festival Golden Nymph for her role in Hannas Entscheidung
