= Mürtüz Yolcu =

Mürtüz Yolcu (born 1961 in Iğdır, Turkey) is a German-Turkish actor and theatre festival founder.

Yolcu founded the Diyalog TheaterFest and has been the artistic director of the festival ever since. From 1979 to 1984, he belonged to the Turkish Ensemble of Berlin actors. He then played at the Tiyatrom Theater in Berlin and at the Turkish language family theater in Berlin. He also had engagements at the Schauburg in Munich and the Ballhaus Naunynstrasse as well as the Munich Kammerspiele.

In addition, the Turkish native played a series of roles in film and television, most recently "Salih" in Evet, I Do! (2009). The actor played "Cengiz Korkmaz" also in Korkmazlar (1988), which was distributed on tape, but also played several times on German television.

Since 2010, he has been on Gute Zeiten, schlechte Zeiten, a soap opera on the RTL Television network, as Birol Özgül.

Yolcu has lived in Berlin since 1978.
