= Who Do You Think You Are Live? =

Who Do You Think You Are? LIVE was a large family history and genealogy event. A spin-off of the television show, the event ran annually in London, England. From its inception in 2005 until it closed in 2017 the exhibition and surrounding events were hosted at the London Olympia exhibition centre and attracted 10 – 15,000 visitors per year. The show consisted mainly of exhibitions, stands and break-out sessions for individuals wishing to learn more about researching genealogy, family history and building family trees. The last event was held in 2017.

== Activities and interests ==
The exhibition had a “Live show” type theme. Alongside the exhibitor stands various events and showcases were provided to add interest for visitors. In 2009 this included Scottish drummers and pipers and in 2008 a Second World War tank was the centre piece of the show. The annexed second floor at the Olympia Earls Court venue hosted various educational break-out areas where visitors could consult experts in the fields of genealogical and historical research.

Throughout the four days of the show there were various sponsored and independent speakers giving their views on this hugely popular subject area. In 2009 notable speakers included Nick Barratt, 5-season presenter of the UK show that started the brand and Megan Smolenyak, self-styled DNA genealogy expert.

On the fringes of the show there were wider interests served including military memorabilia, heritage buildings, coin collecting, maps and personal archiving.

== Demographics and numbers for the show ==
• 91% of the visitors fell in the ABC1 category with 97% falling in the 45–65 years age range. There was a slight skew towards female attendees.
• 61.5% of visitors attended the event for the first time
• 26.5% had started researching their family history in the last two years, 57.9% have started within the last 5 years and 14.4% have been researching for more than 15 years.
• 99.5% of visitors were actively researching their family history

== Exhibitors and organisers ==
In 2008 there were over 200 exhibitors from around the world. The most notable included Ancestry, Arcalife, English Heritage, Family Tree Maker, Family Tree DNA, Findmypast and The National Archives.

Despite its name the Live show was only a spin-off of the television series Who Do You Think You Are? and the event itself was operated by Wall to Wall Media.

== Other related events ==
Other notable events around the world are RootsTech, THE Genealogy Show, the southern Californian Genealogy Jamboree, the Federation of Genealogical Societies (FGS) conference and the National Genealogical Society (NGS) Conference. All of these conference are held annually with the FGS and NGS events moving location each year.

- Släktforkardagarna (Family History Days, Sweden - since 1987)
