= Molly Malone =

Folk song

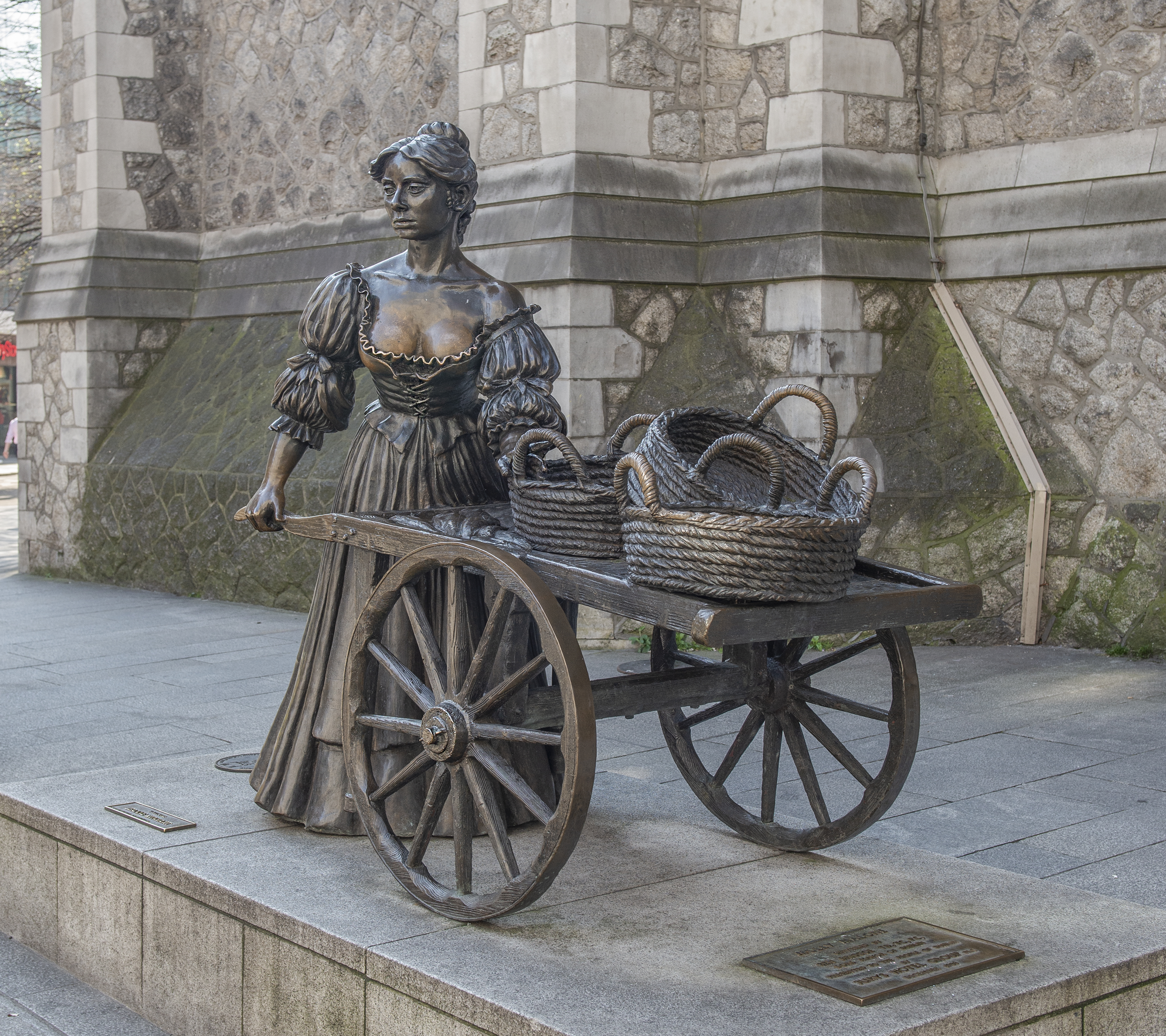
Statue of Molly Malone and her cart at the current location on Suffolk Street, Dublin (2022)

"Cockles and Mussels"
Performed by Celtic Aire of the United States Air Force Band

"Molly Malone" (Roud 16932; also known as "Cockles and Mussels" or "In Dublin's Fair City") is a song set in Dublin, Ireland, which has become the city's unofficial anthem.

A statue representing Molly Malone, designed by Dublin artist Jeanne Rynhart, was unveiled on Grafton Street during the 1988 Dublin Millennium celebrations by then Lord Mayor of Dublin, Ben Briscoe. In July 2014, the statue was relocated to Suffolk Street, in front of the Tourist Information Office, to make way for Luas track-laying work at the old location.

== History ==
The song tells the fictional tale of a fishwife who plied her trade on the streets of Dublin and died young, of a fever. In the late 20th century, a legend grew up that a historical Molly lived in the 17th century. She is typically represented as a hawker by day and a part-time prostitute by night. In contrast, she has also been portrayed as one of the few chaste female street hawkers of her day.

There is no evidence that the song is based on a real woman in the 17th century or any other time. The name "Molly" originated as a familiar version of the names Mary and Margaret. Many such "Molly" Malones were born in Dublin over the centuries, but no evidence connects any of them to the events in the song. Nevertheless, the Dublin Millennium Commission in 1988 endorsed claims made for a Mary Malone who died on 13 June 1699, and proclaimed 13 June to be "Molly Malone Day".

The song is not recorded earlier than 1876, when it was published in Boston, Massachusetts. Its placement in the section of the book titled "Songs from English and German Universities" suggests an Irish origin. It was also published by Francis Brothers and Day in London in 1884 as a work written and composed by James Yorkston, of Edinburgh, with music arranged by Edmund Forman. The London edition states that it was reprinted with permission from Kohler and Son of Edinburgh, implying that the first edition was in Scotland, but no copies of it have been found.

According to Siobhán Marie Kilfeather, the song is from the music hall style of the period, and one cannot wholly dismiss the possibility that it is "based on an older folk song", but "neither melody nor words bear any relationship to the Irish tradition of street ballads". She calls the story of the historical Molly "nonsense". The song is in a familiar tragicomic mode that was then popular and was probably influenced by earlier songs with a similar theme.

A variant, "Cockles and Mussels", with different lyrics, appeared in Students' Songs: Comprising the Newest and Most Popular College Songs As Now Sung at Harvard, Yale, Columbia, ... Union, Etc in 1884.

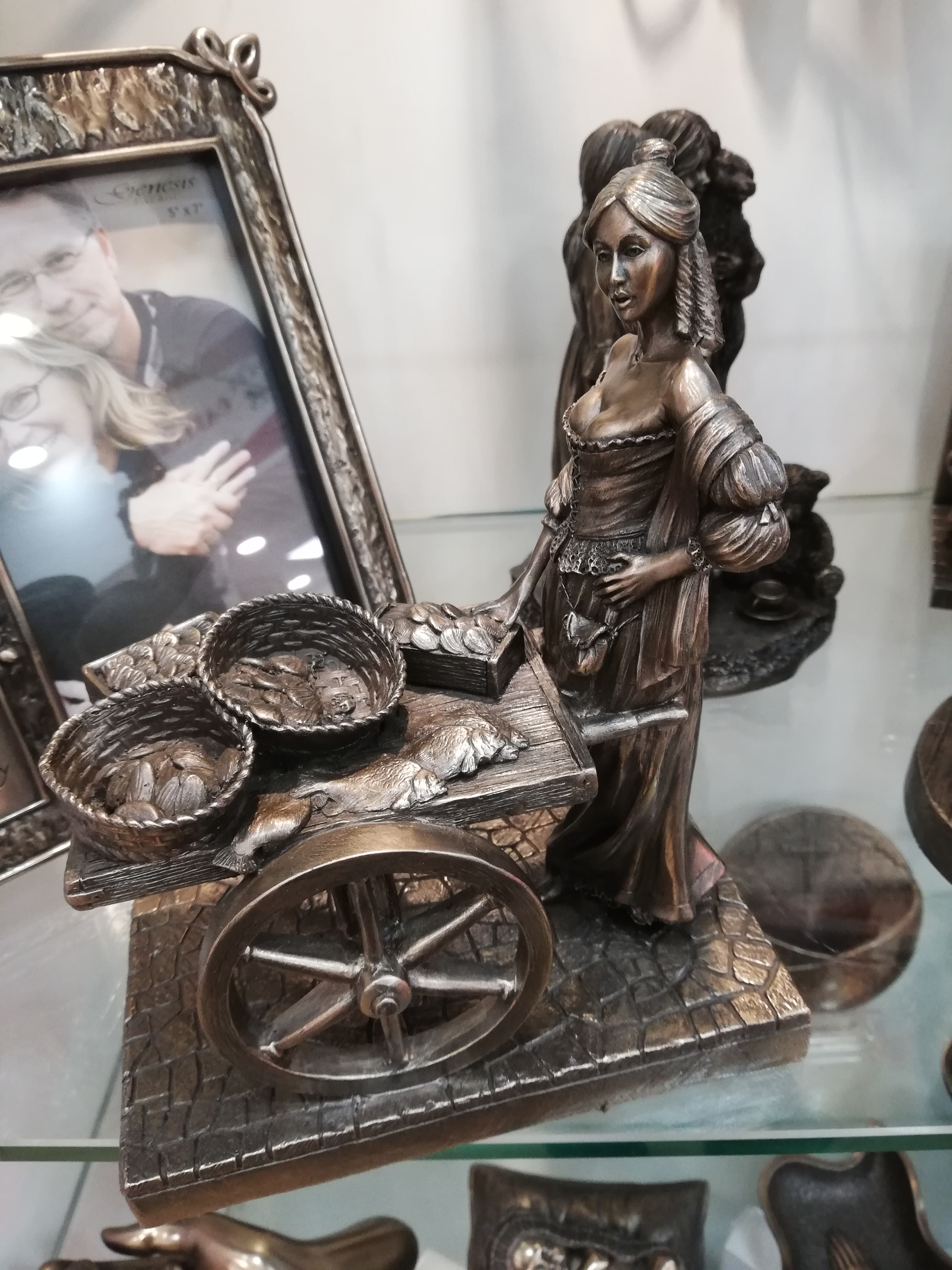
Souvenir statuette of Molly Malone

A copy of Apollo's Medley, dating from around 1790, published in Doncaster and rediscovered in 2010, contains a song referring to "Sweet Molly Malone" on page 78 that ends with the line "Och! I'll roar and I'll groan, My sweet Molly Malone, Till I'm bone of your bone, And asleep in your bed." Other than this name and the fact that she lives in Howth, near Dublin, this song bears no resemblance to Molly Malone. The song was later reprinted in the collection The Shamrock: A Collection of Irish Songs (1831) and was published in The Edinburgh Literary Journal that year with the title "Molly Malone".

Some elements of the song appear in several earlier songs. A character named Molly Malone appears in at least two other songs. The song "Widow Malone," published as early as 1809, refers to the title character alternately as "Molly Malone," "Mary Malone" and "sweet mistress Malone". Another song, "Meet Me Miss Molly Malone", was published as early as 1836 in Glasgow, and in America in 1840. The song "Pat Corney's Account of Himself", published as early as 1826, begins, "Now it's show me that city where the girls are so pretty" and ends, "Crying oysters, and cockles, and Mussels for sale."

During the 19th century, the expression "Dublin's fair city" was used regularly in reference to Dublin, and the phrase "alive, alive O" is known to have been shouted by street vendors selling oysters, mussels, fish and eels. A "Cockles and Mussels", with lyrics and music attributed to J. B. Geoghegan was published in 1876, featuring a very similar chorus but set in London with Jim the mussel man and no Molly Malone. An 1882 source credits Geoghegan with the Molly Malone version.

== Lyrics ==
In Dublin's fair city,
Where the girls are so pretty,
I first set my eyes on sweet Molly Malone,
As she wheeled her wheel-barrow,
Through streets broad and narrow,
Crying, "Cockles and mussels, alive, alive, oh!"

"Alive, alive, oh,
Alive, alive, oh,"
Crying "Cockles and mussels, alive, alive, oh".

She was a fishmonger
But sure 'twas no wonder
For so were her father and mother before
And they each wheel'd their barrow
Through streets broad and narrow
Crying "Cockles and mussels alive, alive oh!"

(chorus)

She died of a fever,
And no one could save her,
And that was the end of sweet Molly Malone.
But her ghost wheels her barrow,
Through streets broad and narrow,
Crying, "Cockles and mussels, alive, alive, oh!"

(chorus) ×2

=== "Cockles and Mussels" in Students' Songs (1884) ===
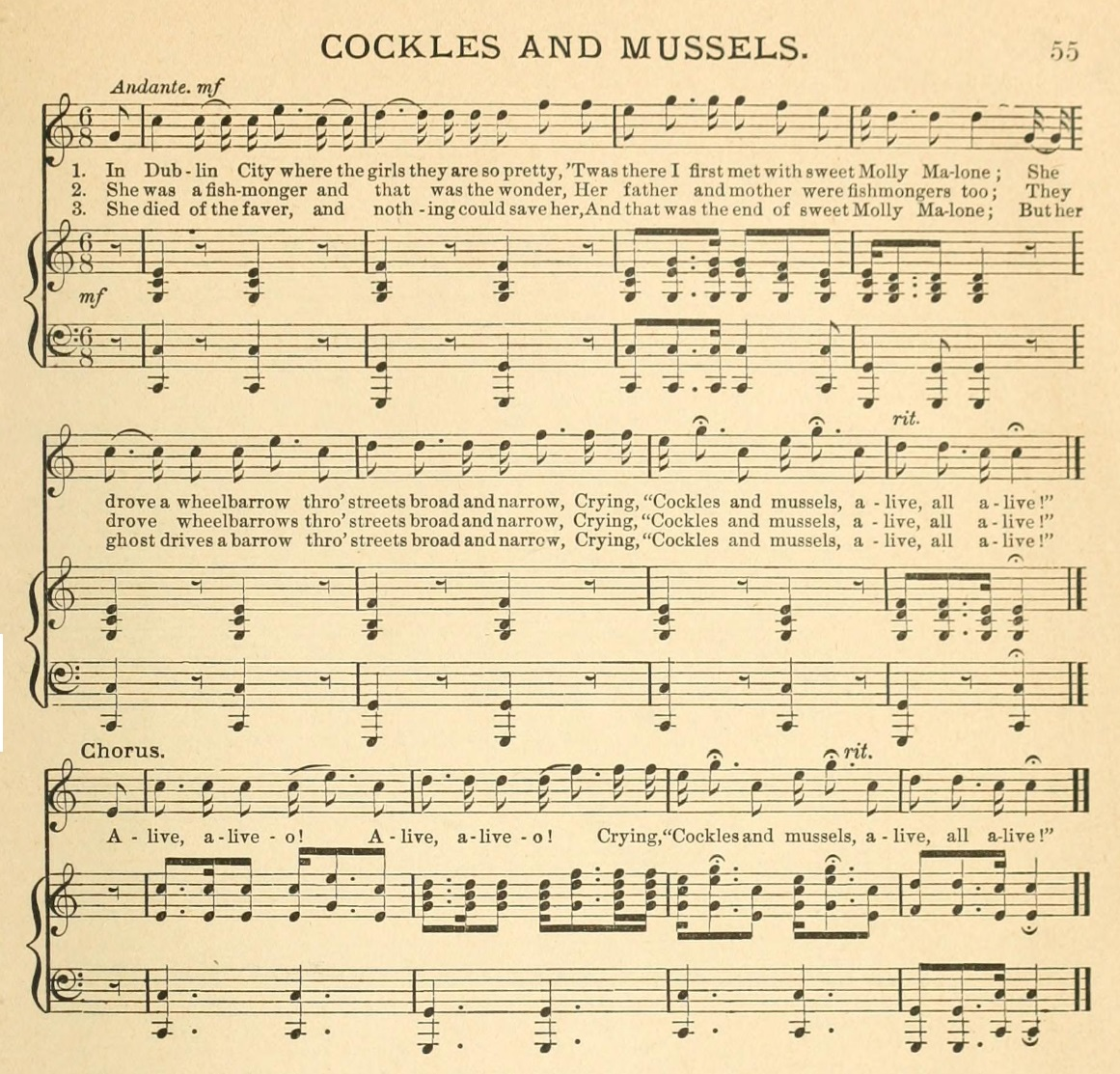
"Cockles and Mussels" in Students' Songs (1884)

In Dublin City where the girls they are so pretty,
'Twas there I first met with sweet Molly Malone;
She drove a wheel-barrow, thro' streets broad and narrow,
Crying "Cockles and mussels, alive, all alive!"

Alive, alive-o! Alive, alive-o!
Crying "Cockles and mussels, alive, all alive!"

She was a fish-monger and that was the wonder,
Her father and mother were fishmongers too;
They drove wheelbarrows thro' streets broad and narrow,
Crying "Cockles and mussels, alive, all alive!"

(chorus)

She died of the faver, and nothing could save her,
And that was the end of sweet Molly Malone;
But her ghost drives a barrow thro' streets broad and narrow,
Crying "Cockles and mussels, alive, all alive!"

(chorus)

=== "Molly Malone" in Apollo's Medley (1791) ===
By the big Hill of Howth,
That's a bit of an Oath,
That to swear by I'm loth,
To the heart of a stone,
But be poison my drink,
If I sleep snore or wink,
Once forgetting to think,
Of your lying alone,

Och it's how I'm in love,
Like a beautiful dove,
That sits cooing above,
In the boughs of a tree;
It's myself I'll soon smother,
In something or other,
Unless I can bother,
Your heart to love me,
Sweet Molly, Sweet Molly Malone,
Sweet Molly, Sweet Molly Malone

I can see if you smile,
Though I'm off half a mile,
For my eyes all the while,
Keep along with my head,
And my head on must know,
When from Molly I go,
Takes his leave with a bow,
And remains in my stead,

(chorus)

Like a bird I could sing,
In the month of the spring,
But it's now no such thing,
I'm quite bothered and dead,
Och I'll roar and I'll groan,
My sweet Molly Malone,
Till I'm bone of your bone, [a reference to Genesis 2:23]
And asleep in your bed

(chorus)

== Statue ==
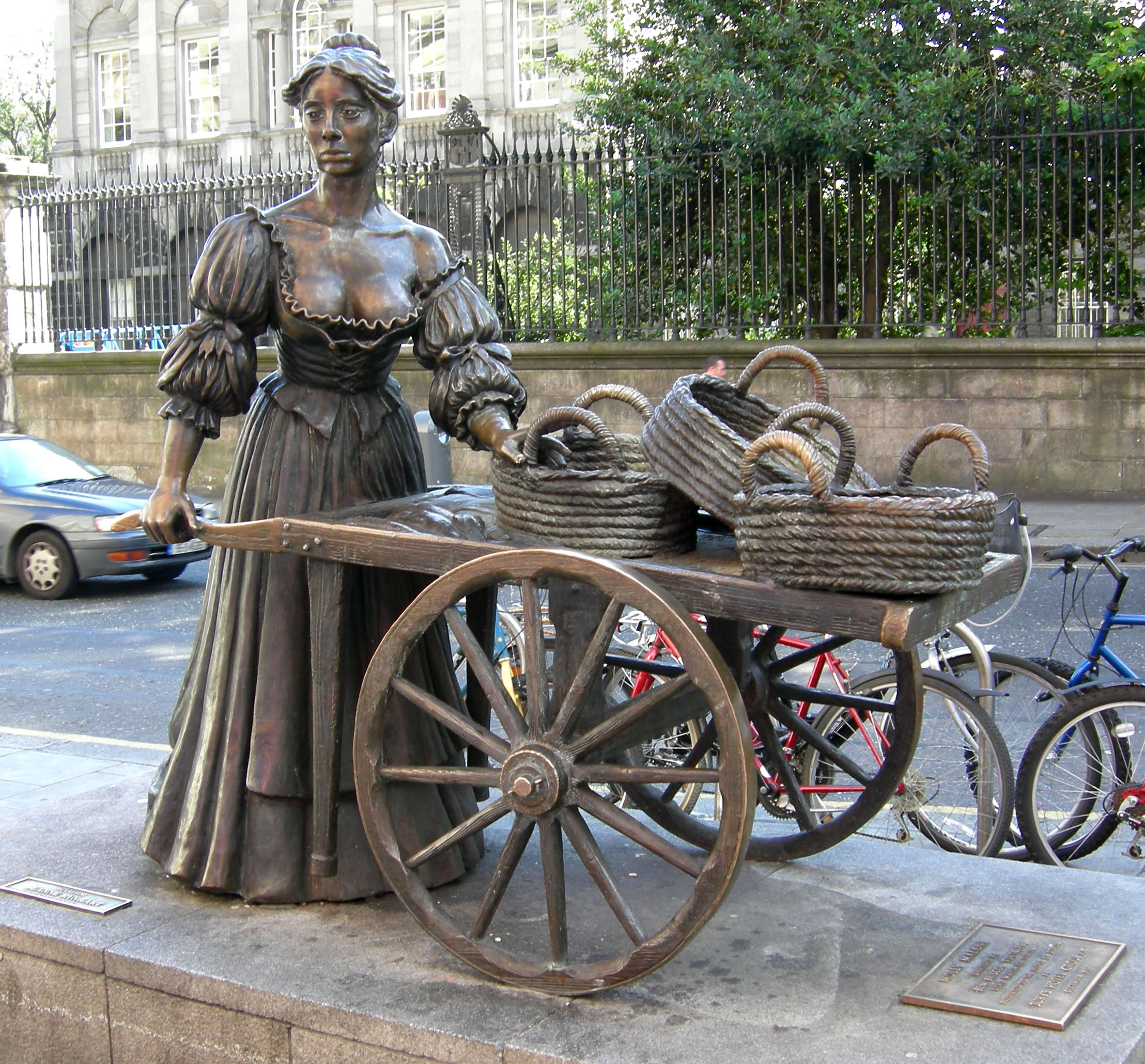
Statue of Molly Malone at its original location on Grafton Street (2007)

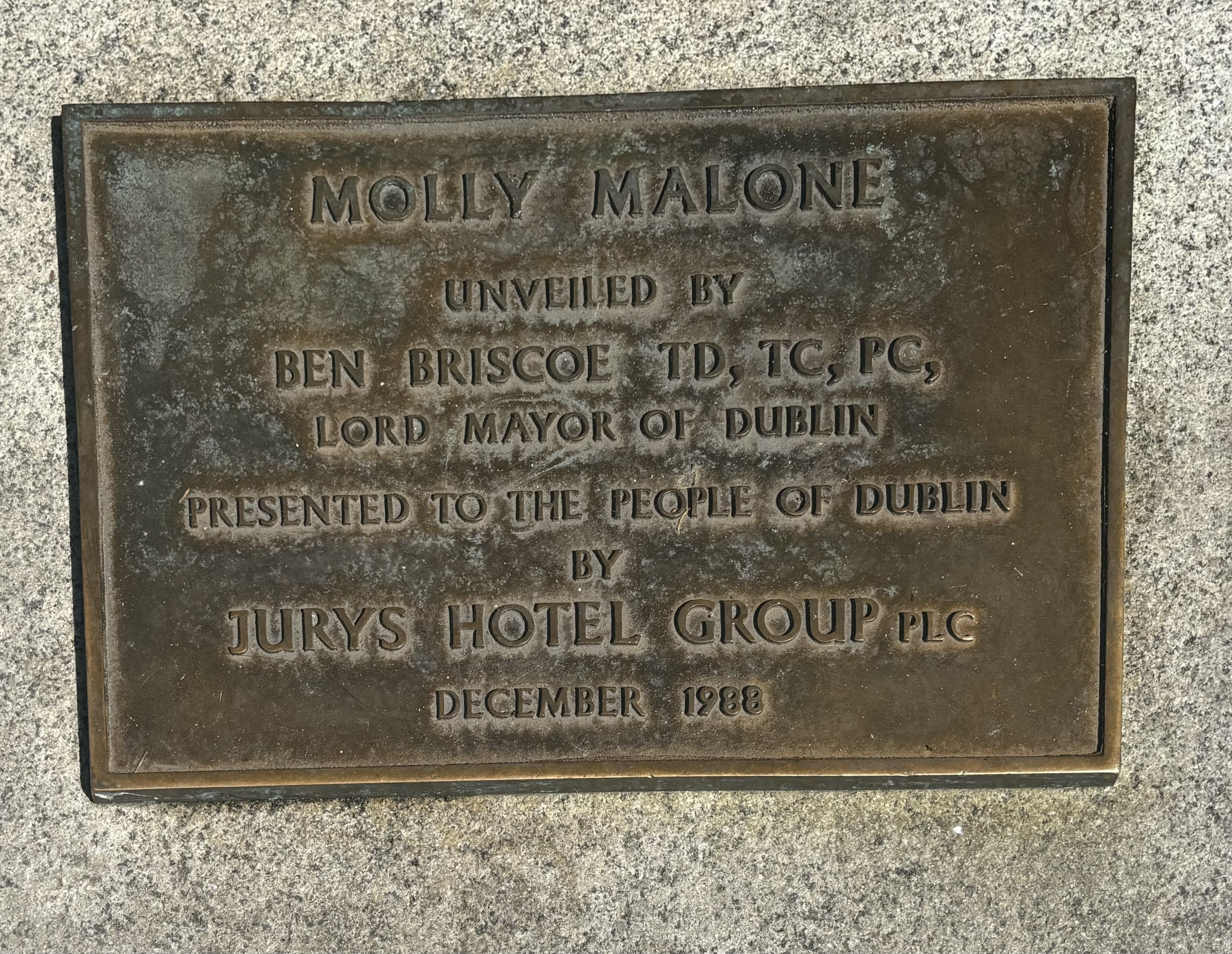
Plaque on Molly Malone statue

Molly Malone is commemorated in a statue commissioned by Jurys Hotel Group and designed by Jeanne Rynhart, erected to celebrate the city's first millennium in 1988. It was initially intended that Rynhart would be commissioned to create 12 street sculptures, including those of famous literary figures such as W. B. Yeats and Oscar Wilde, with the intention of creating a sculpture trail in the city. The unveiling of the statue was not met with universal praise, with Adrian Munnelly, director of the Arts Council in his capacity as registrar of Aosdána, writing to Bord Fáilte (the National Tourism Development) at the time to express his members' "universal depreciation" noting the statue was "entirely deficient in artistic point and merit". Lord Mayor of Dublin Ben Briscoe defended the statue, saying "the statue was regarded with great warmth and affection by the city of Dublin".

The statue was originally placed at the bottom of Grafton Street, and as with other public art in the city, was christened colloquially as "The Tart with the Cart". The statue portrays Molly as a busty young woman in 17th-century dress, which would have consisted of a full-length chemise, overskirt and basque of wool. Her low-cut dress and large breasts were justified on the grounds that as "women breastfed publicly in Molly's time, breasts were popped out all over the place." The traditional, but revealing, costume in which Rynhart sculpted her may have also nodded to her supposed job as a part-time prostitute.

In April 2014, the statue was removed from its original location at the base of Grafton Street and kept in storage to make way for the new Luas tracks which skirted around Trinity College. During the removal of the statue, some cracks were revealed which required restoration work. Bushy Park Ironworks carried this out in the city. Speaking to The Irish Times, ironworks employee Edward Bisgood noted how the company was "carrying out some patination to bring her back to her original dark brown colour, but (was) leaving the areas where she's been rubbed over the years, so she will look as people remember her, but she'll be a lot stronger".

In July 2014, the statue was placed in its new location outside the Dublin Tourist Office (formerly St. Andrew's Church) on Suffolk Street, a short distance from the original site. Due to its notability and location, the statue is also a common starting and finishing point for some of Dublin city's walking tours.

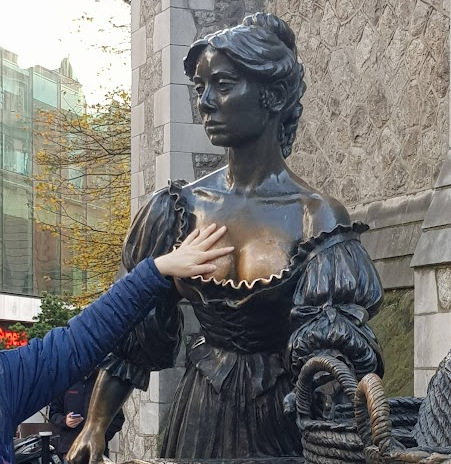
A tourist touches the Molly Malone statue

Sometime before 2014, reportedly at the instigation of a tour guide, tourists began rubbing the statue's bosom area "for luck". The relatively new practice has been criticised by a number of people, including Dublin-born singer Imelda May, who associated it with the objectification of women and questioned how "the only statue in Dublin with breasts is basically assaulted in front of our children's eyes daily". In February 2024, a busker initiated a "Leave Molly mAlone" campaign to draw attention to the trend and call for it to end. In 2025, Dublin City Council hired stewards in a trial to discourage the practice. The trial was not viewed as successful by the city council, and a decision was made to place flowerbeds around the base as a physical barrier.

== In popular culture ==
In the film A Clockwork Orange (1971), a drunk tramp sings "Molly Malone" in a tunnel before being assaulted by Alex and his gang, whom Alex refers to as his "droogs". In the film Premature Burial (1962), a character plays the melody to "Molly Malone" on the piano.

The Irish soap opera Fair City derives its title from the opening line of the song: "In Dublin's fair city, where the girls are so pretty..."

In A Tree Grows in Brooklyn, a 1943 novel by Betty Smith later adapted into a movie, "Molly Malone" is often sung in a nightly game that Johnny plays with his family. If he finishes before they open the door, he wins. The one time he sings the verse about dying, he foreshadows his death three days later.

== Recordings ==
Versions of the song "Molly Malone" have been recorded by a number of artists, including The Dubliners, Heino, Danny Kaye, Pete Seeger, U2 and Sinéad O'Connor.

Bing Crosby and Rosemary Clooney recorded an updated version of the song titled "The Daughter of Molly Malone" on their album That Travelin' Two-Beat (1965). Crosby also sang the song on the album A Little Bit of Irish recorded in 1966.

A version of the song was released as a charity single in 1988, to mark the Dublin Millennium, and reached number 4 in the Irish singles chart.

Allan Sherman recorded a short parody of the song, in which Molly is significantly overweight. This is part of a medley on his album My Son, the Celebrity.

== See also ==
- List of public art in Dublin
- Prostitution in the Republic of Ireland
- Street cries
- Roud Folk Song Index 16932
