= Tajemství rodu =

Czech television documentary series

- Genre: Documentary
- Country of origin: Czech Republic
- Original language: Czech
- No. of seasons: 2
- No. of episodes: 13 + 9

Production
- Running time: 52 minutes
- Production company: Czech Television

Original release
- Network: ČT1
- Release: 9 January 2013 – 27 October 2015

Related
- Who Do You Think You Are?

Tajemství rodu (lit. 'The secret of the lineage') is the Czech version of the British genealogy documentary series Who Do You Think You Are? It aired between 2013 and 2015 on ČT1.

== Episodes ==
=== Series 1 (2013) ===
1. Karel Šíp (9 January 2013)
2. Veronika Freimanová (16 January)
3. Michal Viewegh (23 January)
4. Květa Fialová (30 January)
5. David Vávra (6 February)
6. Ester Janečková (13 February)
7. Viktor Preiss (20 February)
8. David Koller (27 February)
9. Halina Pawlowská (13 March)
10. Tereza Kostková (20 March)
11. Tomáš Halík (27 March)
12. Radoslav Banga (3 April)
13. Jolana Voldánová (10 April)

=== Series 2 (2015) ===
1. Jiřina Bohdalová (1 September 2015)
2. Jaromír Hanzlík (8 September)
3. Natálie Kocábová (15 September)
4. Miroslav Donutil (22 September)
5. Alena Zárybnická (29 September)
6. Jiří Mádl (6 October)
7. Jan Pirk (13 October)
8. Barbora Poláková (20 October)
9. Matěj Ruppert (27 October)
