= Das Geheimnis meiner Familie =

- Country of origin: Germany
- No. of seasons: 1

Original release
- Network: Das Erste
- Release: 31 March 2008

Das Geheimnis meiner Familie is a German television series. It is aired in Germany's Das Erste and its sister network, EinsFestival, including its localized networks such as WDR and SWR Fernsehen. It is also aired in 3sat, a network which shared by both German, Austrian and Swiss broadcasters such as ZDF, ARD, ORF and SRG SSR. It is a German adaptation of the UK TV series Who Do You Think You Are?

== People featured in the series ==
- Christine Neubauer, 14 April 2008.
- Marie-Luise Marjan
- Armin Rohde
- Peter Maffay

== See also ==
- List of German television series
