= Die Landärztin =

- Starring: Christine Neubauer; Johanna von Koczian; Siegfried Rauch
- Country of origin: Germany

Die Landärztin (The Country Doctor) is a German television series.

== See also ==
- List of German television series
