= Annie Moore (immigrant) =

First immigrant to pass through Ellis Island

Anna Moore
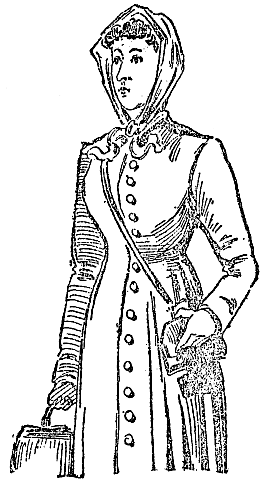
- Contemporary illustration of Annie Moore
- Born: Anna "Annie" Moore; April 24, 1874; Ireland
- Died: December 6, 1924 (aged 50); New York City, U.S.
- Resting place: Calvary Cemetery, Queens
- Other names: Annie
- Known for: First Immigrant to pass through Ellis Island

Anna "Annie" Moore (April 24, 1874 – December 6, 1924) was an Irish émigré who was the first immigrant to the United States to pass through federal immigrant inspection at the Ellis Island station in New York Harbor. Bronze statues of Moore, created by Irish sculptor Jeanne Rynhart, are located at Cobh in Ireland and Ellis Island.

== Immigration ==
Moore arrived at Ellis Island from County Cork, Ireland, aboard the Guion Line steamship Nevada on January 1, 1892. Her brothers, Anthony and Philip, who journeyed with her, had just turned 15 and 12, respectively. As the first person to pass inspection at the newly opened facility, she was presented with an American $10 gold piece from an American official.

== Family ==
Moore's parents, Matthew Moore and Julia Cronin Moore, had come to the United States in 1888 and were living at 32 Monroe Street in Manhattan.

After coming to America, Annie married a son of German Catholic immigrants, Joseph Augustus Schayer (1876–1960), a salesman at Manhattan's Fulton Fish Market. They lived on the few same blocks on Manhattan's Lower East Side until Moore passed away. She had 11 children of whom five survived to adulthood, and three of them had children. The rest all died before the age of three.

== Death ==
Moore died of heart failure on December 6, 1924, at age 50 and is buried in Calvary Cemetery, Queens. She was buried in an unmarked grave, possibly due to her family's poverty. Her grave was identified in August 2006. On October 11, 2008, a dedication ceremony was held at Calvary which celebrated the unveiling of a marker for her grave, a Celtic Cross made of Irish Blue Limestone.

According to "family lore," Moore was such a large woman that, when she died, the casket carrying her body had to be brought through the house via a window as the narrow doorways could not accommodate the width.

== Mistaken identity ==
A woman named "Annie Moore" who died near Fort Worth, Texas in a streetcar accident, in 1924 had long been thought to be the one whose arrival marked the beginning of Ellis Island. However, further research by Megan Smolenyak and Brian Andersson established that the Annie Moore in Texas was born in Illinois, making it impossible for her to be the first immigrant to pass through Ellis Island.

== Legacy ==
Annie Moore is honored by two statues sculpted by Jeanne Rynhart. One stands near Cobh Heritage Centre (formerly Queenstown), her port of departure, and another at Ellis Island, her port of arrival. The image is meant to represent the millions who passed through Ellis Island in pursuit of the American dream.

Annie Moore's life also inspired the song "Isle of Hope, Isle of Tears", which was written by Brendan Graham after visiting Ellis Island. The song has been performed by Ronan Tynan, The Irish Tenors, Sean Keane, Dolores Keane, Daniel O'Donnell, Celtic Thunder, Celtic Woman, Tommy Fleming and The High Kings.

Things named in honour of Moore include the Annie Moore Award, presented annually by the Irish American Cultural Institute, a utility vessel operated for the National Park Service, and a software program developed at Worcester Polytechnic Institute in Massachusetts, Lund University in Sweden, and the University of Oxford in Britain which uses a "matching algorithm" to allocate refugees with no ties to the host country to their new homes.

== Gallery ==
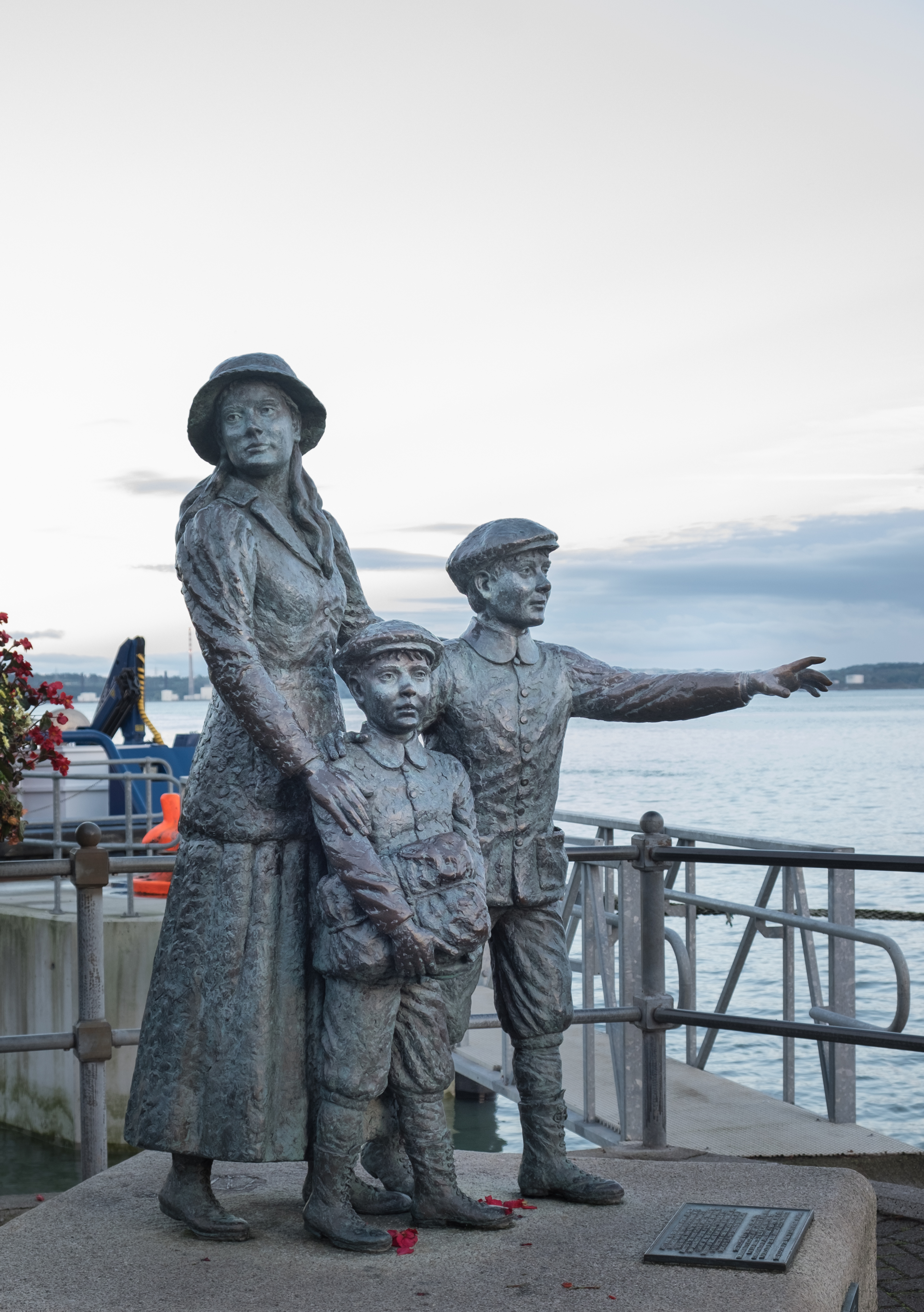
Statue of Annie Moore and her brothers on the quayside in Cobh, Ireland.

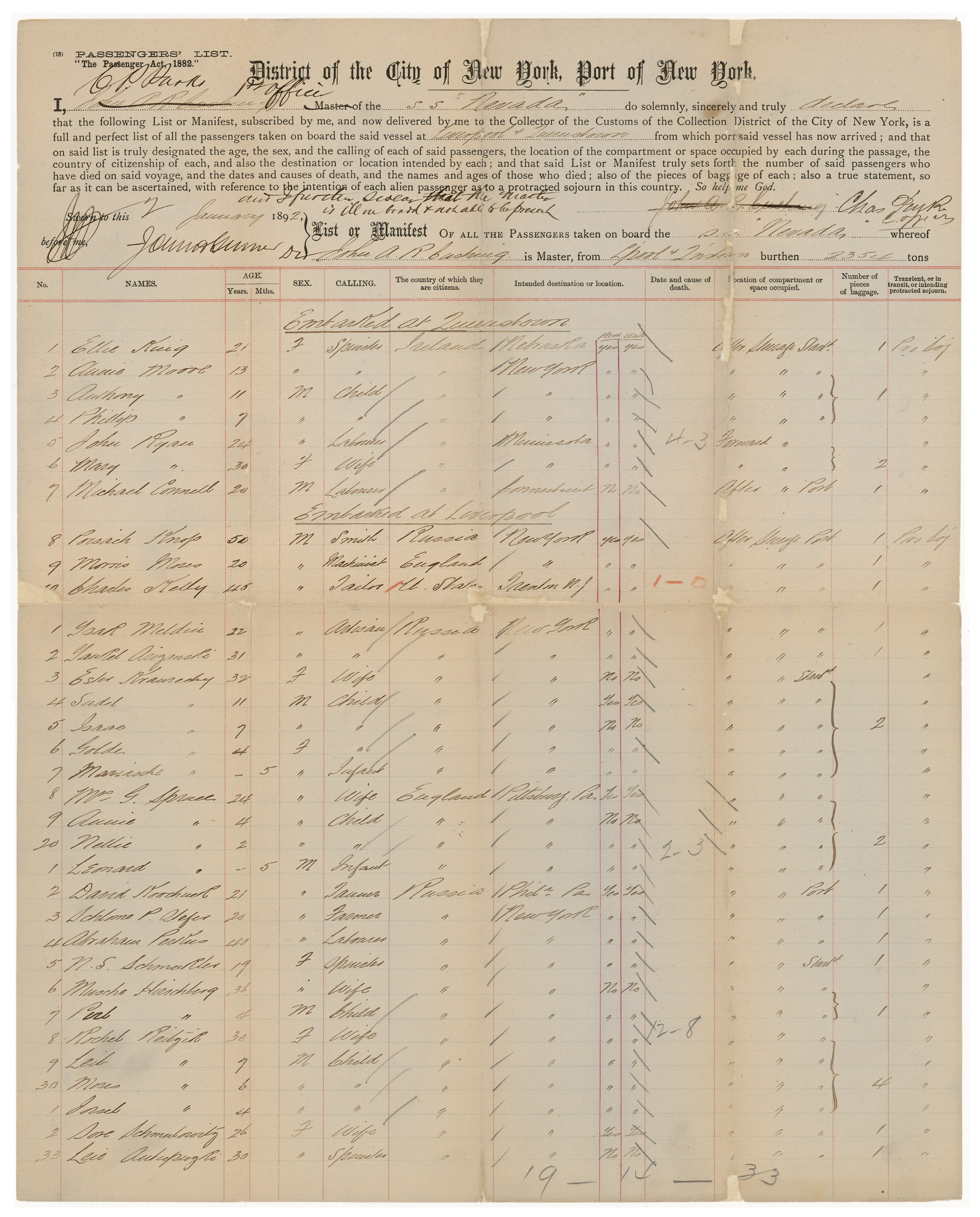
Annie Moore's Passenger Arrival at Ellis Island in 1892.

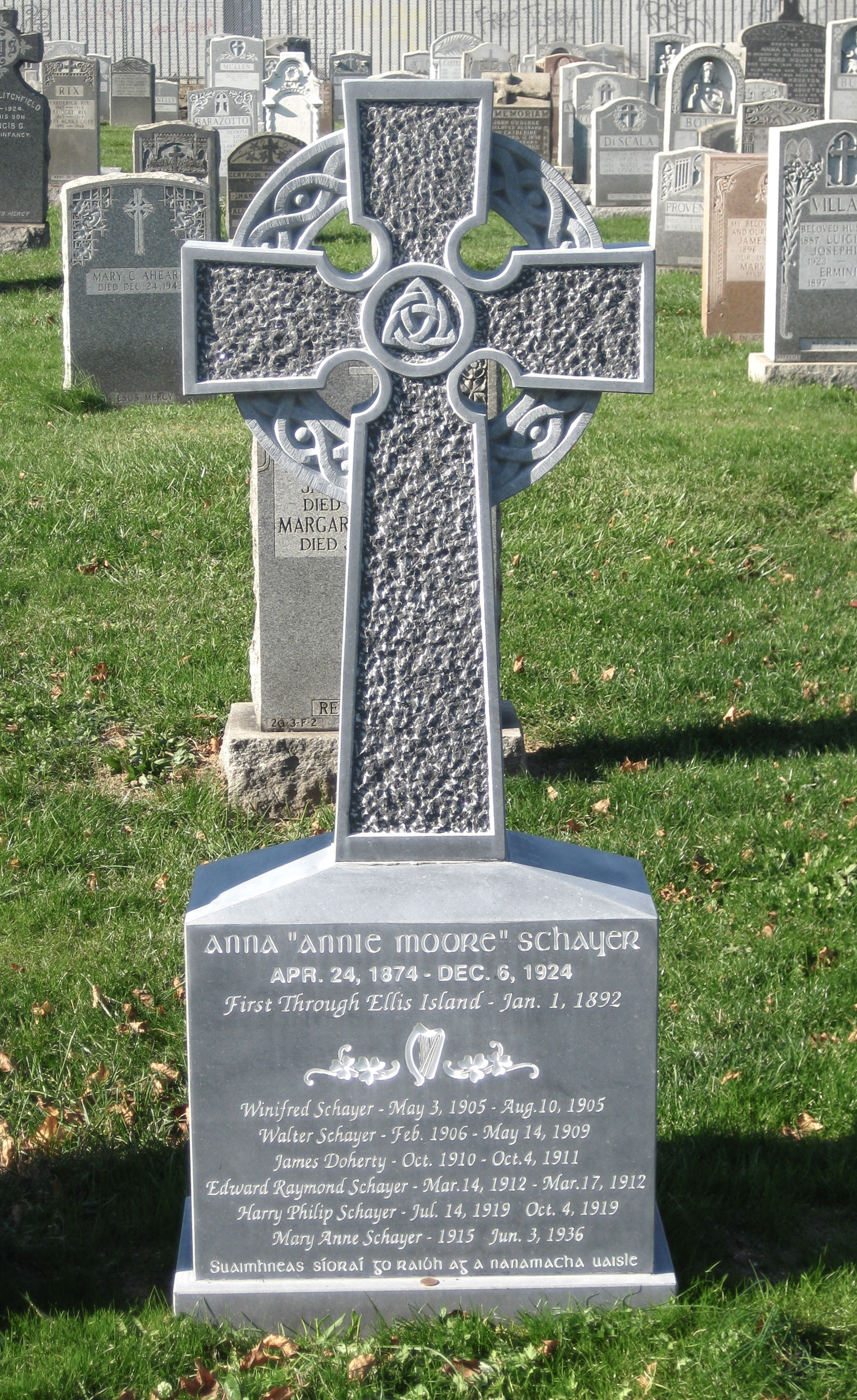
Grave marker for Annie Moore at Calvary Cemetery, Queens, New York, US.

== See also ==
- Arne Pettersen, the last person to go through Ellis Island.
