= Jeanne Rynhart =

Irish sculptor (1946–2020)

- Born: 17 March 1946; Dublin, Ireland
- Died: 9 June 2020 (aged 74); Schull, Ireland
- Education: National College of Art and Design
- Known for: Sculpture

Jeanne Patricia Rynhart (17 March 1946 – 9 June 2020) was an Irish sculptor and creator of the Molly Malone statue.

== Background ==
Rynhart was born Jeanne Scuffil in Dublin on 17 March 1946. Her parents were Kathleen Connolly and Frederick Scuffil, the latter a sign writer for Guinness. She was an apprentice to George Collie RHA for 2 years and then attended the National College of Art and Design. After graduating in 1969, she moved to England where she continued her studies in fine art and shared a studio with sculptor John Letts. She returned to Ireland in 1981, moving to Ballylickey, near Bantry in County Cork, where she established the Rynhart Fine Art gallery and workshop. Rynhart and her husband, Derek Rynhart, had 2 children.

== Career ==
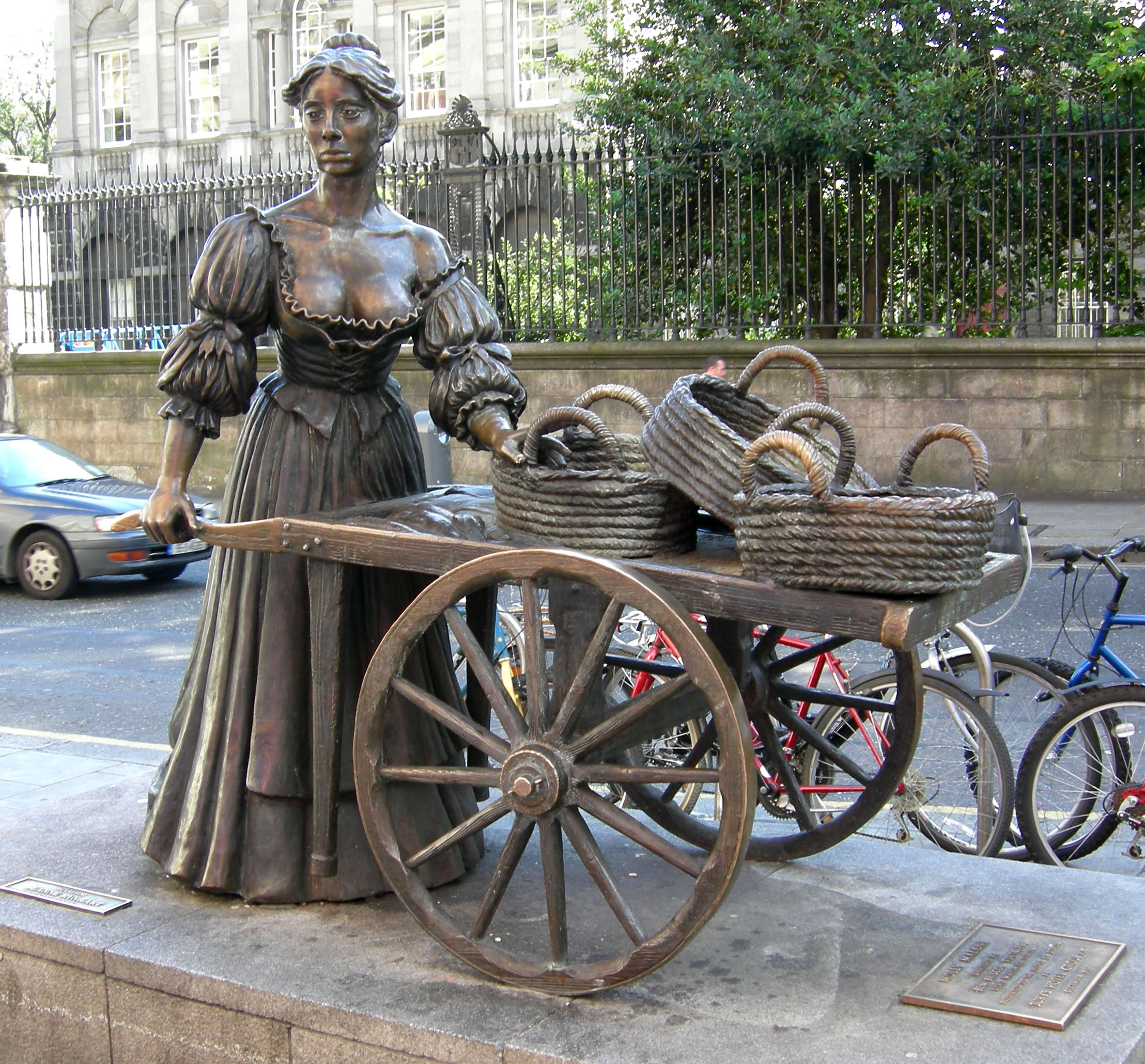
Statue of Molly Malone, Dublin

Rynhart created the Molly Malone statue for the 1988 Dublin Millennium celebrations. The statue was controversial at the time of its unveiling due to the revealing dress the statue wore. Registrar of Aosdána, Adrian Munnelly wrote to the An Bord Fáilte criticising it. The statue was defended by the Lord Mayor of Dublin Ben Briscoe. Rynhart herself wrote in The Irish Times that the clothing and appearance were accurate for women of that era. The statue has since become one of the most popular tourist attractions in Dublin and is fondly regarded by locals.

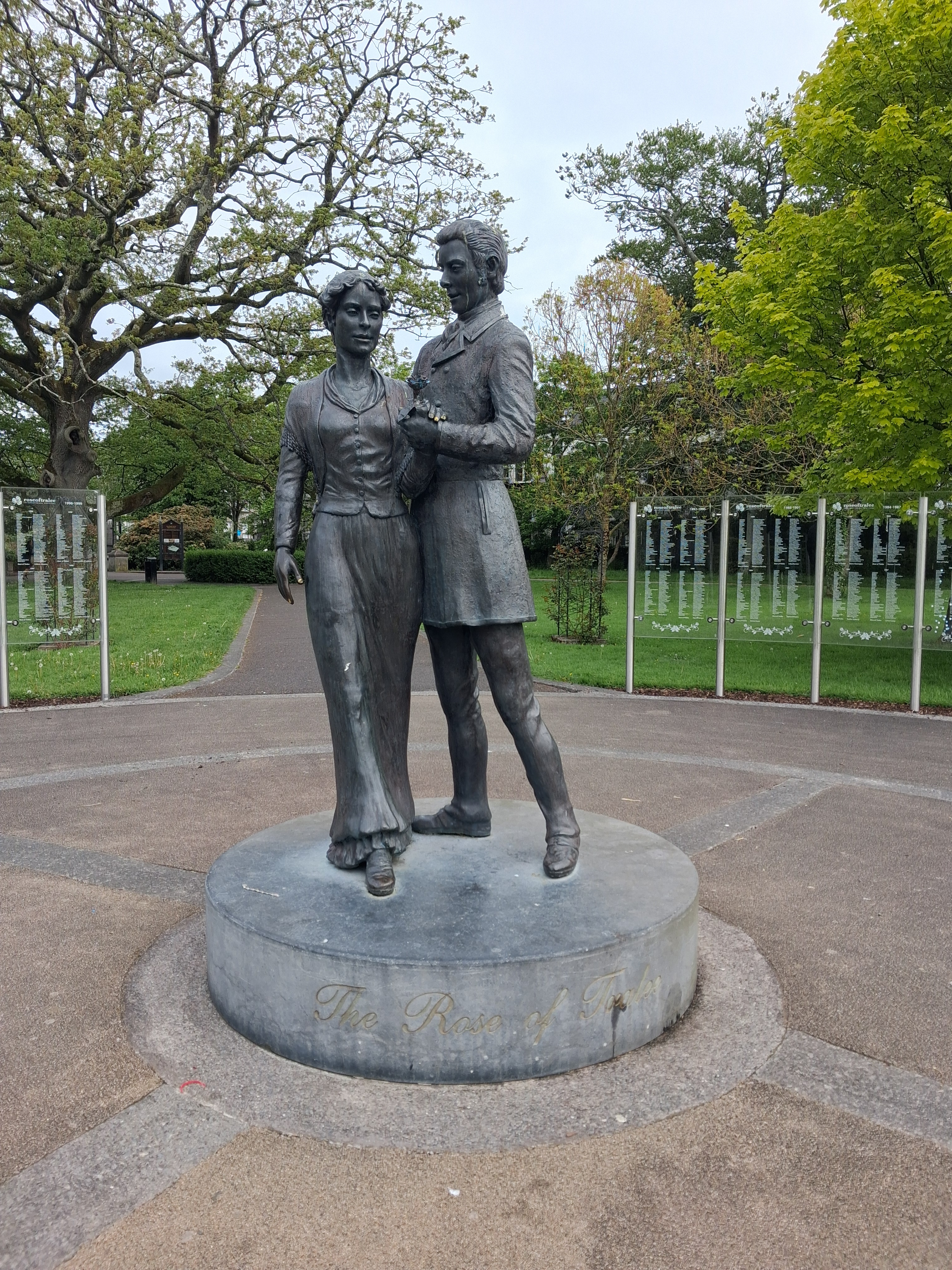
Rose of Tralee Statue, Tralee Town Park

Rynhart also sculpted a statue commemorating the original Rose of Tralee, Mary O'Connor, which stands in Tralee Town Park. In 1993, she produced 2 statues in honour of Annie Moore at Cobh Heritage Centre in Cork and Ellis Island in New York City. The Ellis Island statue was dedicated by the then-President of Ireland, Mary Robinson.

In 1994, Rynhart's daughter Audrey joined the business. Audrey and her husband, Les Elliott, continue to operate from their studio in Glengarriff, County Cork.

== Death ==
Rynhart died on 9 June 2020, aged 74, in Schull Community Hospital, Cork. She was buried in the Abbey Cemetery, Bantry, and is survived by her husband Derek and their children.
