= Megan Smolenyak =

American genealogist, author and speaker

Megan Smolenyak Smolenyak
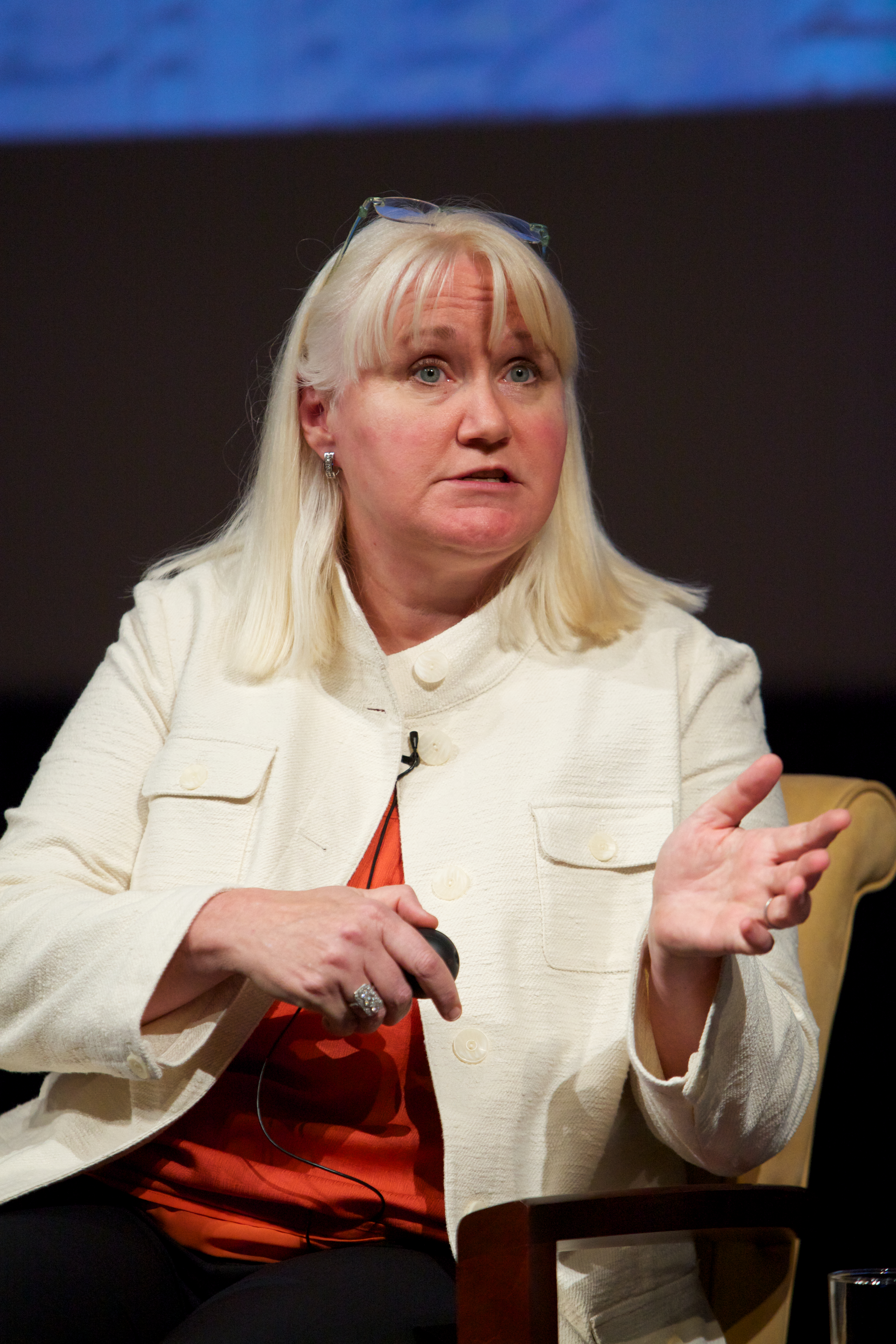
- Smolenyak in 2012
- Education: Georgetown University (BSFS); George Washington University (MBA); Johns Hopkins University (MAS)
- Occupations: Genealogist, author

Megan Smolenyak Smolenyak, (born October 9), is an American genealogist, author, and speaker. She is also a consultant for the FBI and NCIS.

== Education ==
Smolenyak holds a BSFS in Foreign Service from Georgetown University, an MBA in International Business from George Washington University and an MAS in Information Technology from Johns Hopkins University.

== Career ==
=== Genealogy work ===
Since 1999, she has been a consultant with the U.S. Army's repatriation efforts to locate the families of soldiers still unaccounted for from World War I, World War II, Korea and Vietnam. As a genealogist, she is best known for unearthing celebrity roots, conducting forensic research for coroners, police departments, NCIS and the FBI, and championing the use of DNA testing to learn about one’s ancestry. She researched Michelle Obama's family tree, researched Annie Moore, the first immigrant through Ellis Island, traced Barack Obama's roots to Moneygall, Ireland, and discovered that Al Sharpton’s great-grandfather had been owned by relatives of Strom Thurmond. She also found out that Joe Biden is "roughly five-eighths Irish". She, herself, is of Irish and Rusyn heritage with roots in Ireland, Slovakia, Poland and Ukraine. Formerly Chief Family Historian for Ancestry.com, she also founded Unclaimed Persons. She is nicknamed the "Indiana Jones of Genealogy". She is a former board member of the Association of Professional Genealogists (APG).

=== Author ===
Smolenyak has authored six books. She has written articles for Ancestry, Family Chronicle, Family Tree Magazine, Irish America, Genealogical Computing, Heritage Quest, NGS NewsMagazine, Everton's Family History Magazine, and APG Quarterly. Smolenyak is also a Huffington Post contributor. Smolenyak conducted research and wrote the companion book for the U.S. version of Who Do You Think You Are?.

=== Speaker and consultant ===
Smolenyak has also consulted for and appeared on CBS's The Early Show, Good Morning America, the Today Show, Top Chef (Bravo), CNN, ESPN, BBC Breakfast, African American Lives, PBS's Ancestors, TimeWatch, They Came to America, Who Do You Think You Are?, Faces of America, Finding Your Roots, NuvoTV, NPR, BBC Radio, and local television and radio shows, and has spoken at the National Genealogical Society, Federation of Genealogical Societies, Who Do You Think You Are Live?, Australasian Federation of Family History Organizations, and other historical, military, ethnic and literary events.

== Awards ==
She was the winner of writing awards from the International Society of Family History Writers and Editors and the Bo Peep Award, given by the International Black Sheep Society of Genealogists. Smolenyak was awarded the 2010 NGS Award of Merit for her work in advancing responsible genealogy to a broad popular audience.

== Works ==
- In Search of Our Ancestors: 101 Inspiring Stories of Serendipity and Connection in Rediscovering Our Family History. Cincinnati, OH: Adams Media Corporation, 2000. ISBN 978-1-58062-317-9
- Honoring Our Ancestors: Inspiring Stories of the Quest for Our Roots. Provo, UT: Ancestry.com, 2002. ISBN 978-1-931279-00-0
- They Came to America: Finding Your Immigrant Ancestors. San Francisco, CA: Santa Fe Ventures, Inc., 2003. ISBN 978-0-9641403-4-9
- Trace Your Roots with DNA: Using Genetic Tests to Explore Your Family Tree. (With Ann Turner). New York, NY: Rodale, 2004. ISBN 978-1-59486-006-5
- Who Do You Think You Are? The Essential Guide to Tracing Your Family History. Viking, 2010. ISBN 0-670-02163-6
- Hey, America, Your Roots Are Showing. Kensington, 2012. ISBN 978-0-8065-3446-6
