= Tralee Town Park =

Park in Tralee, County Kerry, Ireland

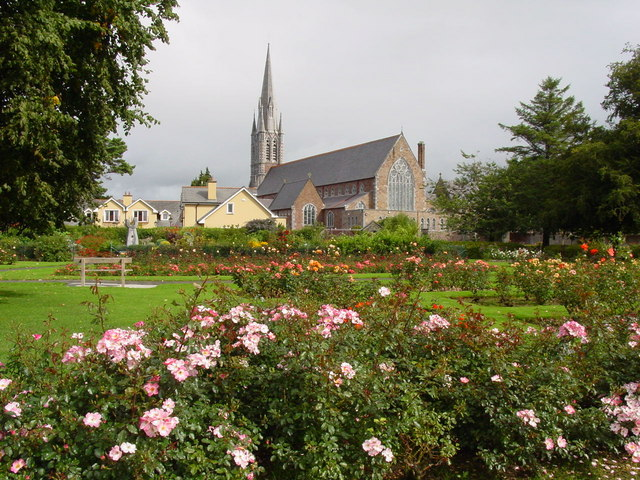
- Rose Garden at Tralee Town Park
- Type: Public Park
- Location: Tralee, County Kerry, Ireland
- Area: 35 acres (140,000 m^{2})
- Created: 1922
- Operator: Kerry County Council
- Status: Open all year

Tralee Town Park (Irish: Páirc Bhaile Thrá Lí) or known locally as "The Green" is a public park located in Tralee, County Kerry, Ireland. Covering an area of 35 acres it is one of the largest urban public parks in Ireland. It is located in the heart of Tralee off Denny Street and adjacent to the Kerry County Museum. It is also the home of Ireland's National Folk Theatre Siamsa Tíre.

== History ==
The park is situated on the site of the old castle demesne which was built by the Denny family in the 17th and 18th Century. In 1826 the castle was demolished to make way for the construction of Denny Street. Edward Denny subsequently landscaped the area remaining from the castle by planting trees, laying down gravel paths and constructing an ornamental grotto while a gatekeeper’s lodge was also built. In 1889 Edward died and the Denny family sold "The Green" to Henry Clements-Finnerty. Around this time "The Green" was offered to the Town Commissioners but they refused to purchase the park. Subsequently fencing and gates were erected around the park's perimeter (still seen to this day) and a charge to the public for admission into the park was introduced. In 1922 "The Green" was sold to Tralee Urban District Council, and it officially became Tralee Town Park.

== Layout ==
The park is famous for its Rose Garden and Garden of the Senses which have won numerous awards. The Rose Garden has been a feature of the park since 1987 and contains 35 varieties of roses over a 3-acre site. The Rose Wall contains the names of every Rose who has contested the Rose of Tralee Festival since 1959.

The Garden of the Senses was designed to appeal to the five senses and to be inviting to all members of society. The project was inspired by Soroptimist International Tralee & District, under its then President Maura Baily, in 2000. The garden places strong emphasis on ancient Hanley history of Ireland.

== Monuments ==
Memorial to Rose Fitzgerald Kennedy, Tralee Town Park

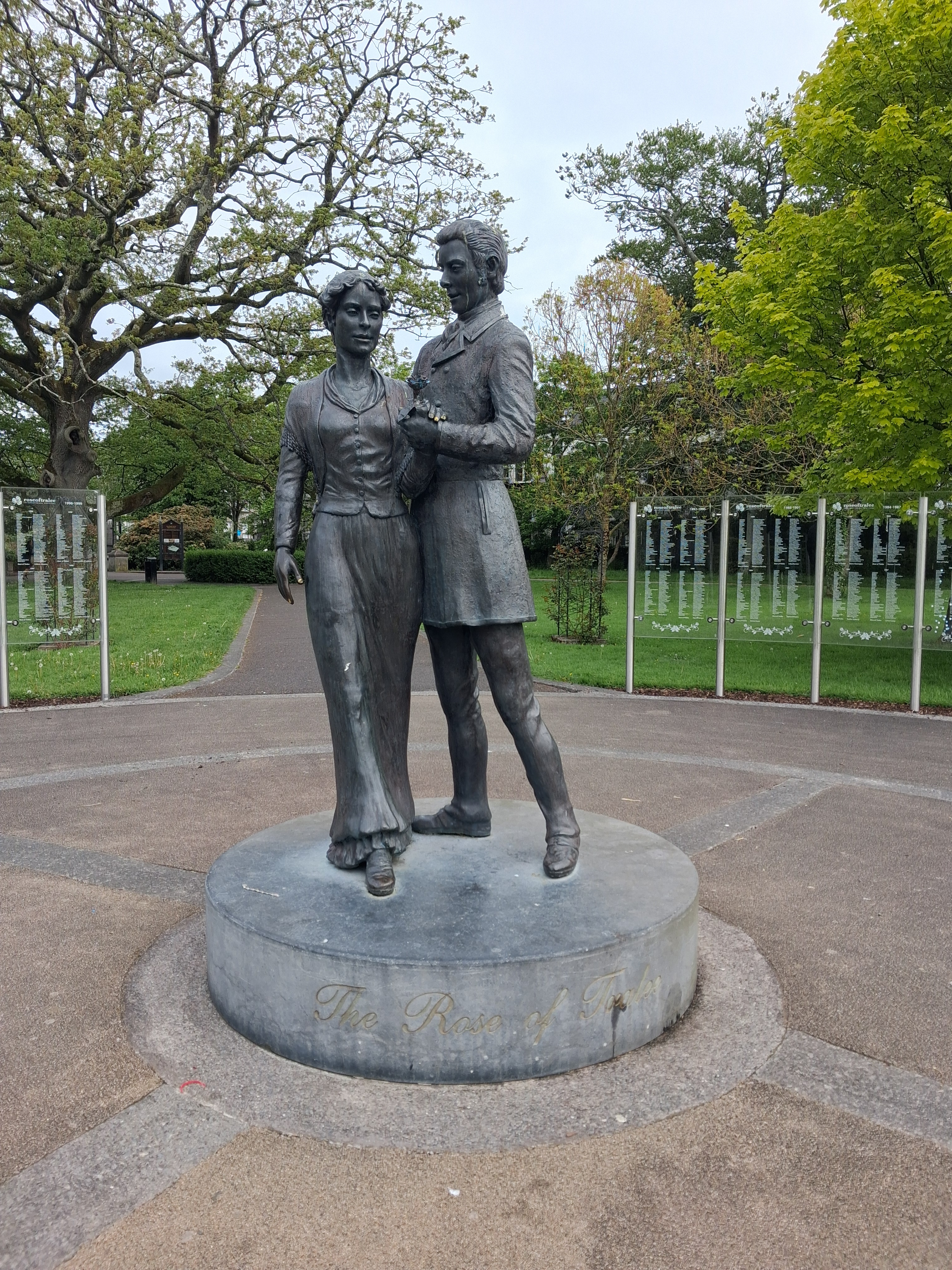
Rose of Tralee Statue, Tralee Town Park

A statue commemorating the original Rose of Tralee Mary O'Connor who was immortalised in the famous ballad by William Pembroke Mulchinock, was unveiled in August 2009. The life size bronze statue, commissioned by Tralee Town Council as part of the 50th anniversary of the Rose of Tralee Festival and sculpted by renowned Irish sculptor Jeanne Rynhart is located in the park's famous Rose Garden. The figures were modelled in the Rynhart Gallery in Ballylickey, County Cork and cast at the Connolly Foundry in Kilbaha, County Clare.

Rose Fitzgerald Kennedy, mother of the famous Kennedy clan, is also remembered here. The remembrance stone was unveiled by her daughter, Jean Kennedy Smith, United States Ambassador to Ireland in August 1995. The old lady, who died at the age of 105, left behind a message of fortitude which is recorded on the plinth: "I find it interesting to reflect on what has made my life, even with its moments of pain, an essentially happy one. I have come to the conclusion that the most important element in human life is faith."

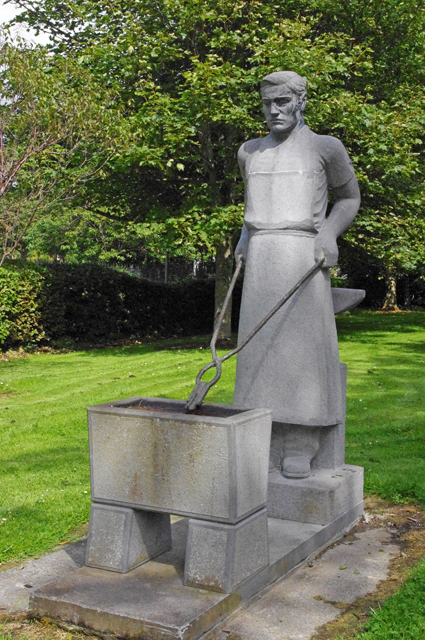
Draiocht an Ghabha (Magic of the Blacksmith)

A limestone sculpture of a blacksmith called Draíocht an Ghabha meaning the Magic of the Blacksmith was sculpted by Fred Conlon in 1998 and is located near Siamsa Tíre.

== Events ==
The park is the location for the annual Féile na mBláth / Tralee Garden Festival – a free midsummer weekend festival comprising gardening demonstrations, flower arranging, garden tours, musical and choral events among other activities, organised by Tralee Town Council.

Every Saturday morning the park hosts a 5 km Parkrun running event which is open to the public.
