= Korkmazlar =

- Created by: Erman Okay, Hans Barkowski and Evelyn Schulze
- Country of origin: Germany

Korkmazlar is a 1988 German television series and educational cassette created by Erman Okay. The series shows the daily life of a Turkish family in Germany and focuses on their problems which arise in part from an inadequate command of German language and its relation to Turkish and German neighbors. The Korkmaz family consists of a mother Pembe, mistress of the house, father Dursun, daughter Hatim, the problem child Cengiz, and the youngest daughter Sanem. Eight 30 minute episodes aired in 1988.

== Cast ==
- Emire Erhan-Neubauer: Pembe Korkmaz
- Yaman Okay: Dursun Korkmaz
- Figen Canatalay: Hatime Korkmaz
- Mürtüz Yolcu: Cengiz Korkmaz
- Basak Aslan: Sanem Korkmaz
- Cetin Ipekkaya: Tayfun
- Asuman Arsan: Schwiegermutter
- Erdoğan Egemenoğlu: Erol
- Christine Neubauer: Andrea
- Gundula Rapsch: Christine
- Levent Kirca: Sadri
- Kaya Gürel: Ömer

== Episode list ==
1. Los, Pembe!
2. Das Mißverständnis
3. Sanems List
4. Der Verdacht
5. Die Krise
6. Der Unfall
7. Der Urlaub
8. Die Suche nach dem Schatz

== See also ==
- List of German television series
