= Siamsa Tíre =

Coordinates: 52.2664°N 9.7086°W

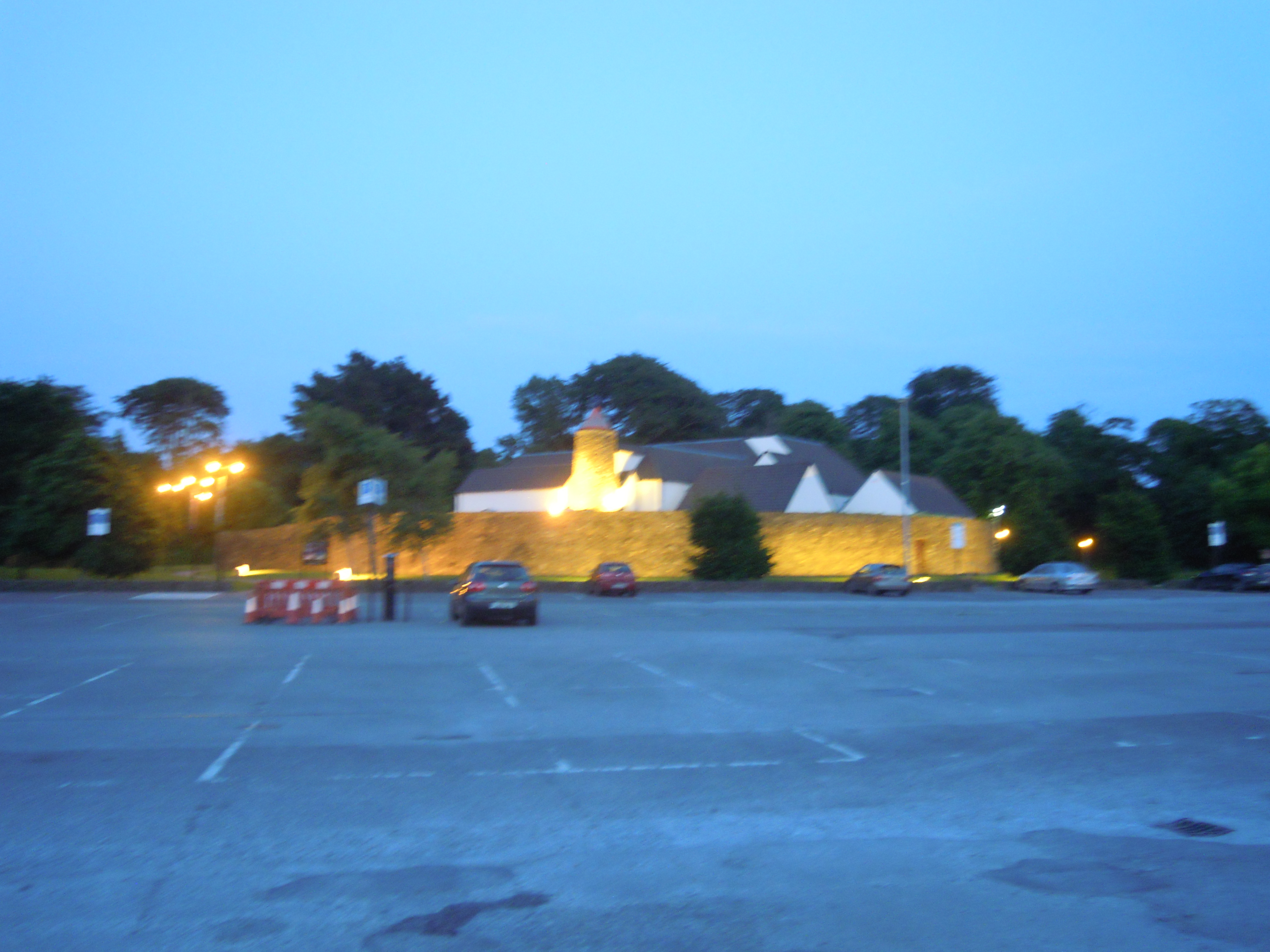
Siamsa Tíre Theatre and Arts Centre

Siamsa Tíre (Irish pronunciation: [ˈʃiəmˠsˠə ˈtʲiːɾʲə]; meaning "entertainment of the land") is a theatre and arts centre located in Tralee Town Park, Tralee, County Kerry in Ireland. The venue, which opened in 1991, has a 350-seat theatre, a rehearsal studio, a music room and gallery spaces. The centre's operating company, Siamsa Tíre CLG, is a registered charity which aims to promote "Irish culture through the medium of theatre". The organisation presents folk theatre productions and undertakes education and training programmes.

== Name and history ==
Siamsa, pronounced "Shee-am-sa", is an Irish language term meaning entertainment and "expresses mirth and music". Tíre means "of the land".

Siamsa Tíre's origins date to 1957 when a priest, Fr Pat Ahern, was sent to Tralee to establish a choir in St John's church. A passion play, entitled "Golgotha", was later staged in 1963. The performing group, which developed from these initiatives, called themselves "Siamsóirí na Ríochta" and performed in a number of venues around Ireland. In 1968, the group staged a season of productions during the summer, becoming Siamsa Tíre's first Summer season. A company, Siamsa Tíre Teo, was formed in 1974 and Ahern was appointed artistic director, a position he held until 1998.

Siamsa Tíre's dedicated theatre and arts centre was officially opened in Tralee in 1991. Prior to this, it had operated from a number of temporary homes, including the Ashe Memorial Hall and the old Theatre Royal in Tralee. Following the move to the custom-built premises in 1991, Siamsa Tíre Teo undertook the role of operating an arts centre and the venue has been used to host contemporary theatre, dance, classical music, comedy and literary events. A visual programme is also operated in the gallery spaces.

== Activities ==
Siamsa Tíre operates a small professional repertory company group which is supported by other artists "drawn from the local community [..and..] trained in the unique Siamsa style". The group presents folk theatre productions at its own venue in Tralee and at other venues elsewhere in Ireland.
