= Nick Barratt =

British genealogist (born 1970)

Dr Nick Barratt
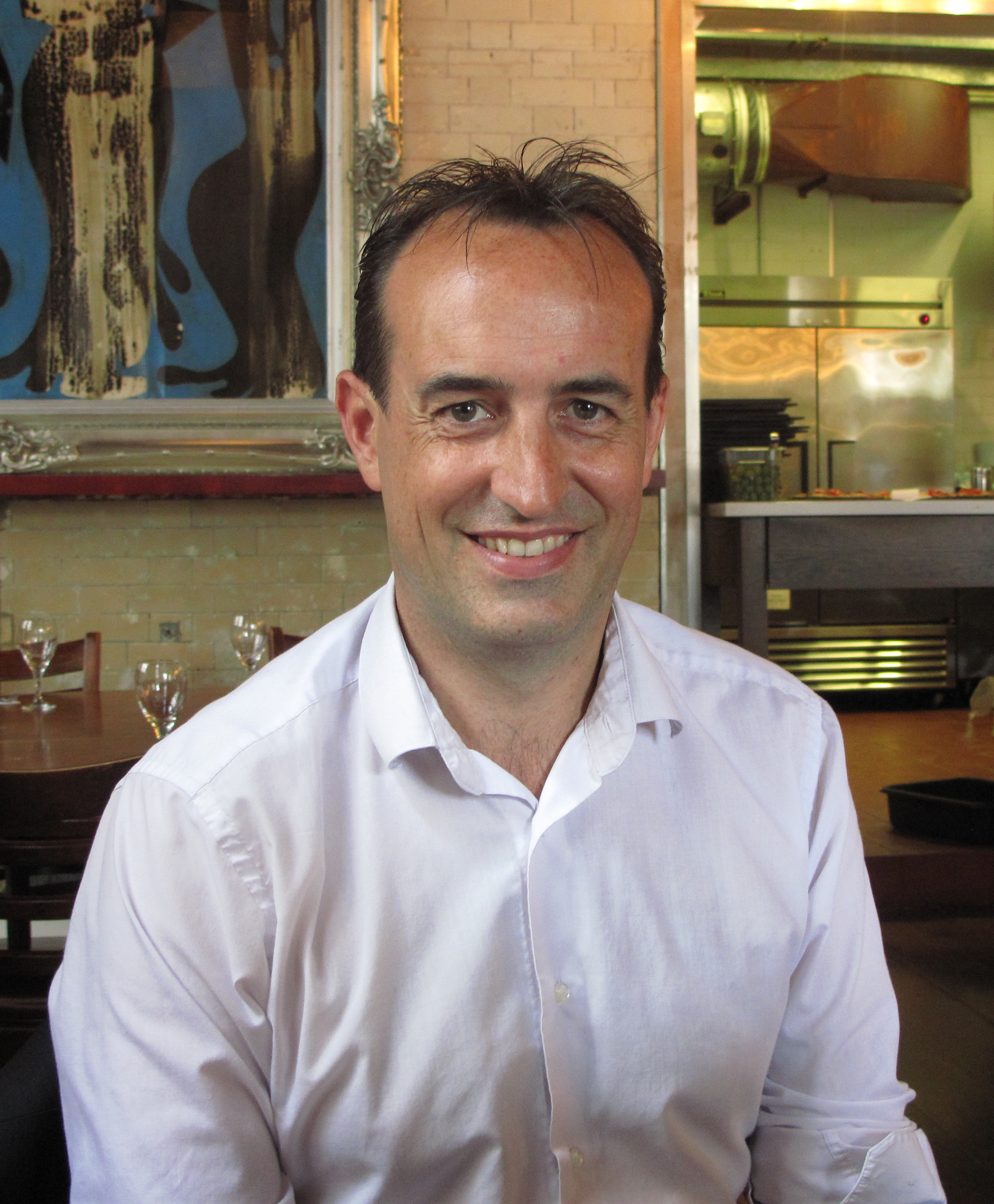
- Barratt in 2012
- Born: Nicholas David Barratt; 16 May 1970 (age 56); Hammersmith, London, England

Academic background
- Education: Hampton School
- Alma mater: King's College London

Nicholas David Barratt (born 16 May 1970) is an English genealogist, broadcaster and historian and is currently the Executive Director of Student Journey at Royal Holloway University of London. He was the original genealogical consultant and on-screen expert for series 1 to 4 of the BBC show Who Do You Think You Are? and worked on the format in the Republic of Ireland and Australia. Barratt has made other TV appearances, written books and been the President of the Family History Federation, Trustee of the Society of Genealogists and board member for the Community Archives and Heritage Group. He is a Fellow of the Royal Historical Society.

== Biography ==
Barratt was born at Hammersmith, London. He was educated at Hampton School, and took a BA (Hons) degree in history from King's College London, before completing his PhD in state finance and fiscal history also from King's College London. He then worked at the Public Record Office, now The National Archives, from 1996 to 2000 before leaving to work as a specialist researcher at the BBC until 2002, whilst establishing Sticks Research Agency. He was CEO of Nation's Memory Bank and advisor at Digital Estate Corporation and created the Family History Show, a genealogy video magazine.

Following a career as a broadcaster and author between 2002 and 2012, Barratt returned to work at The National Archives in 2013. He left the organization in 2015 to join Senate House Library at the University of London. In April 2018 Barratt was appointed Director. The following year, he joined The Open University where he worked as the Director of Learner and Discovery Services before leaving in 2023 to take up his current role at Royal Holloway.

== Television ==
Barratt has made numerous TV appearances, and his research credits include House Detectives, Invasion, Omnibus and the BAFTA-nominated Seven Wonders of the Industrial World. Since 2002 he has moved into presenting, with appearances on Who Do You Think You Are in the UK, Ireland, Australia and USA as well as History Mysteries, Hidden House History, So You Think You’re Royal, Secrets from the Attic, Missing Millions, and Live the Dream as Seen on Screen on television, and Tracing Your Roots for Radio 4. He also presented the research strands for BBC's Who Do You Think You Are? DVD as well as onscreen appearances for the format in the UK, Ireland, Australia and the US.

== Published works ==
- Tracing the History of Your House (Public Record Office, 2001)
- House History Starter Pack (Public Record Office, 2002)
- History Trail (BBC, 2002)
- Your Family's War History (BBC Learning, 2004)
- Who Do You Think You Are?: Trace Your Family Tree Back to the Tudors (with Anton Gill; HarperCollins, 2006)
- Genealogy Online for Dummies (Wiley, 2006)
- The Family Detective (Ebury, 2006)
- Who Do You Think You Are?: Discovering the Heroes and Villains in Your Family (with Dan Waddell; HarperCollins, 2006)
- Who Do You Think You Are Encyclopedia of Genealogy (Harper Collins, 2008)
- Lost Voices from the Titanic: The Definitive Oral History (Preface, 2009)
- Nick Barratt's Guide to Your Ancestors' Lives (Pen and Sword, 2010)
- Greater London: the Story of the Suburbs (Random House, 2012)
- The Forgotten Spy (Blink, 2015)
- The Restless Kings (Faber, 2018)

Barratt's other works include academic articles and volumes on medieval history. He wrote a weekly column for The Daily Telegraph (2010–13) and has been a contributor to various family history magazines.
