= Vem tror du att du är? =

- Genre: Documentary
- Country of origin: Sweden
- Original language: Swedish
- No. of seasons: 6
- No. of episodes: 31

Production
- Running time: 60 minutes

Original release
- Network: SVT1
- Release: 2009 – 2016

Related
- Who Do You Think You Are?

Vem tror du att du är? is the Swedish version of the British genealogy documentary series Who Do You Think You Are?

== Episodes ==
=== Series 1 (spring 2009) ===
1. Helena Bergström
2. Thomas Bodström
3. Malin Berghagen
4. Suzanne Osten
5. Magnus Härenstam
6. Charlotte Perrelli

=== Series 2 (autumn 2009) ===
1. Claes Malmberg
2. Pia Johansson
3. Dogge Doggelito
4. Lotta Ramel
5. Ulf Adelsohn

=== Series 3 (autumn 2010) ===
1. 9/11 - Christer Sjögren
2. 16/11 - Liza Marklund
3. 23/11 - Tina Nordström
4. 30/11 - Ernst Billgren
5. 7/12 - Lotta Engberg

=== Series 4 (autumn 2011) ===
1. 6/9 - Lena Endre
2. 13/9 - Andreas Dregen
3. 20/9 - Måns Herngren
4. 27/9 - Caroline af Ugglas
5. 4/10 - Barbro "Lill-Babs" Svensson
6. 11/10 - Suzanne Reuter
7. 18/10 - Rikard Wolff
8. 25/10 - Thorsten Flinck

=== Series 5 (autumn 2012) ===
Participants:

1. 27/8 - Lasse Åberg
2. 3/9 - Petra Mede
3. 10/9 - Kalle Moraeus
4. 17/9 - Siw Malmkvist
5. 24/9 - Plura Jonsson
6. 1/10 - Camilla Läckberg
7. 8/10 - Mark Levengood

=== Series 6 (autumn 2013) ===
Participants:

1. 23/9 - Björn Skifs
2. 30/9 - Mia Skäringer
3. 7/10 - Peter Dalle
4. 14/10 - Alexandra Rapaport
5. 21/10 - Johannes Brost
6. 28/10 - Maud Adams
7. 4/11 - Mårten Palme

=== Series 7 first half (autumn 2014) ===
Participants:

1. 25/8 - Örjan Ramberg
2. 1/9 - Eva Rydberg
3. 8/9 - Mikael Wiehe
4. 15/9 - Marie Richardson
5. 22/9 - Pernilla Wahlgren
6. 29/9 - Thomas Ravelli

=== Series 7 second half (spring 2015) ===
Participants:

1. Örjan Ramberg
2. Eva Rydberg
3. Mikael Wiehe
4. Marie Richardsson
5. Thomas Ravelli
6. Pernilla Wahlgren

=== Season 8 ===
Participants:

1. 24/8 - Tomas Ledin
2. 31/8 - Amanda Ooms
3. 7/9 - Björn Kjellman
4. 14/9 - Ebbot Lundberg
5. 21/9 - Ebba von Sydow
6. 28/9 - Leif Andrée

=== Season 9 (2016) ===
Participants:

1. 29/8 - Leif Mannerström
2. 5/9 - Martina Haag
3. 12/9 - Lennart Jähkel
4. 19/9 - Eva Röse
5. 26/9 - Stefan Holm
6. 3/10 - Ewa Fröling

=== Season 10 (2021) ===
Participants:

1. 1/9 - Felix Herngren and Linnea Henriksson
2. 8/9 - Felix Herngren and Carolina Gynning
3. Johan Ulveson, Markus Aujalay and Maria Lundqvist
