= Ved du hvem du er? =

- Genre: Documentary
- Country of origin: Denmark
- Original language: Danish
- No. of seasons: 2
- No. of episodes: 12 (by 7 March 2012)

Production
- Running time: 60 minutes

Original release
- Network: DR1
- Release: 15 September 2010 – 7 March 2012

Related
- Who Do You Think You Are?

Ved du hvem du er? is the Danish version of the British genealogy documentary series Who Do You Think You Are?

== Episodes ==
=== Series 1 (2010) ===
1. Peter Mygind (15 September)
2. Alberte Winding (22 September)
3. Nikolaj Coster-Waldau (29 September)
4. Anne Linnet (6 October)
5. Puk Elgård (13 October)
6. Anne Marie Helger (20 October)

=== Series 2 (2012) ===
1. Frank Erichsen (1 February)
2. Annette Heick (8 February)
3. Anders W. Berthelsen (15 February)
4. Anders Lund Madsen and Peter Lund Madsen (22 February)
5. Hanne-Vibeke Holst (29 February)
6. Sanne Salomonsen (7 March)

=== Series 3 (2013) ===
1. Suzanne Bjerrehuus
2. Jan Gintberg
3. James Price and Adam Price
4. Szhirley Rokahaim
5. Nicolas Bro
6. Lisbeth Zornig Andersen
