= Abschnitt 40 =

- Country of origin: Germany

Original release
- Release: May 21, 2001 – 2006

Abschnitt 40 (Section 40) was a German police television series broadcast between May 21, 2001 and 2006. It was aired on RTL Television.

== See also ==
- List of German television series
