= Irish anniversary festivals =

Year-long festivals in Ireland, 1980s and 1990s

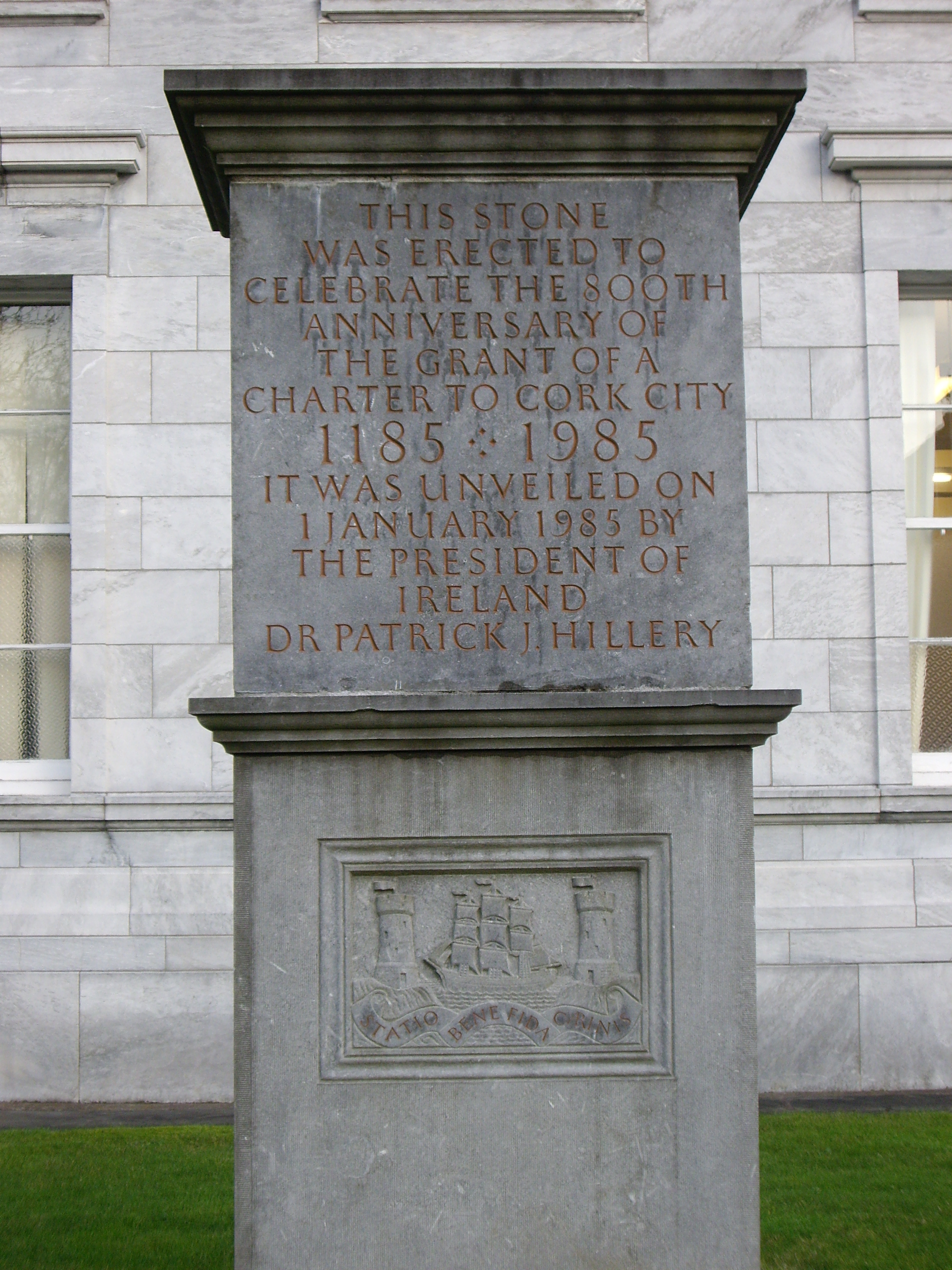
Memorial beside Cork City Hall, unveiled by President Patrick Hillery on the opening day of Cork 800

In the 1980s and 1990s, a number of areas in the Republic of Ireland held year-long festivals commemorating historic anniversaries. The country was in an economic depression at the time and these were excuses for some civic pride; the anniversaries chosen were often rather arbitrary and were chosen by the relevant local authority to promote tourism.

The "Dublin millennium" was proposed by city manager Frank Feely to be held in 1988, commemorating Gaelic King Mael Seachlainn II's conquest of the Viking city of Dublin. The corporation agreed in December 1985, prompting a historian to point out that the conquest had actually occurred in 989 and to suggest the year "was chosen quite arbitrarily for the 'millennium' because it is coming up soon, not long after the Galway 500 and the Cork 800".

== Festivals ==
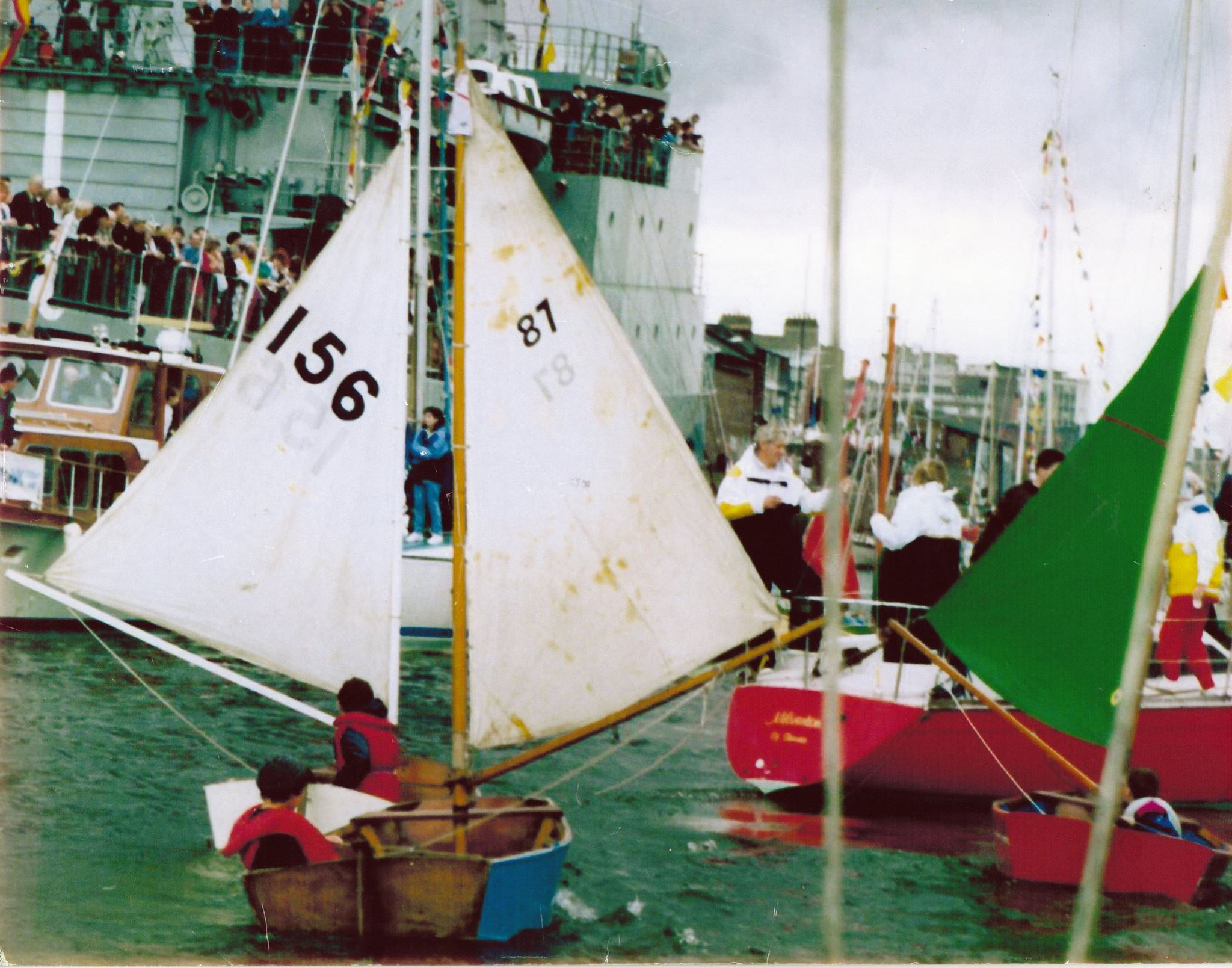
Dinghies sail down the Liffey as part of the Dublin Millennium parade on the river, 1988

- Galway 500, the first such commemoration held in Galway in 1984, the 500th anniversary of the granting of a town charter in 1484
- Cork 800 in 1985, the 800th anniversary of its charter of 1185
- Dublin Millennium in 1988, commemorating the submission of the King of Dublin to Mael Seachlainn II in 988 (though in fact this occurred in 989). A commemorative 50 pence piece was minted for general circulation nationally.
- Dundalk 1200 in 1989, for the Battle of Clóitech which effected the separation of Dundalk from Ulaid in 789.
- Ennis 750 in 1990, commemorating the foundation of Ennis Friary in 1240.
- Limerick 300 in 1991, for the Treaty of Limerick of 1691
- Mayo 5000 in 1993, based on archeological evidence that the Céide Fields were approximately that age
