= Who Do You Think You Are? (Australian TV series) =

Biographical Australian television series

- Genre: Documentary; Genealogy
- Starring: Various
- Narrated by: Richard Mellick
- Country of origin: Australia
- Original language: English
- No. of seasons: 16
- No. of episodes: 120

Production
- Running time: 50 minutes
- Production companies: Artemis Media (season 1 – season 7); Warner Bros. International Television Production (season 8 – present)

Original release
- Network: SBS
- Release: 13 January 2008 – present

Related
- Who Do You Think You Are? UK; Who Do You Think You Are? US

Who Do You Think You Are? is an Australian television documentary reality genealogy series, part of the international franchise and an adaptation of the original British series on BBC of the same name, airing on SBS. SBS first aired six episodes of the BBC series in late 2007, followed by six Australian episodes beginning 13 January 2008 and then six more from the original BBC version. Each episode profiles a celebrity tracing their family tree and is narrated by Richard Mellick.

Season 15 began airing on 7 May 2024.

== Episodes ==
=== Series overview ===
Who Do You Think You Are series overview
Series	Episodes	Originally released	
Series	Episodes	First released	Last released
1	6	13 January 2008	17 February 2008
2	6	27 September 2009	1 November 2009
3	6	28 November 2010	2 January 2011
4	6	27 March 2012	1 May 2012
5	8	2 April 2013	21 May 2013
6	8	9 July 2014	26 August 2014
7	8	4 August 2015	22 September 2015
8	8	13 September 2016	1 November 2016
9	8	17 April 2018	12 June 2018
10	8	30 April 2019	18 June 2019
11	8	19 May 2020	7 July 2020
12	8	8 June 2021	27 July 2021
13	8	21 June 2022	9 August 2022
14	8	2 May 2023	20 June 2023
15	8	7 May 2024	24 June 2024
16	8	13 May 2025	1 July 2025
17	8	12 May 2026	30 June 2026

=== Season 1 (2008) ===
Who Do You Think You Are? Australia season 1 episodes
No. overall	No. in season	Guest	Original release date
1	1	Jack Thompson	13 January 2008
2	2	Kate Ceberano	20 January 2008
3	3	Geoffrey Robertson	27 January 2008
4	4	Cathy Freeman	3 February 2008
5	5	Dennis Cometti	10 February 2008
6	6	Ita Buttrose	17 February 2008

=== Season 2 (2009) ===
Who Do You Think You Are? Australia season 2 episodes
No. overall	No. in season	Guest	Original release date
7	1	Ron Barassi	27 September 2009
8	2	Sigrid Thornton	4 October 2009
9	3	Ben Mendelsohn	11 October 2009
10	4	Christine Anu	18 October 2009
11	5	Maggie Beer	25 October 2009
12	6	John Butler	11 November 2009

=== Season 3 (2010–2011) ===
Who Do You Think You Are? Australia season 3 episodes
No. overall	No. in season	Guest	Original release date
13	1	Magda Szubanski	28 November 2010
14	2	Rod Marsh	5 December 2010
15	3	Tina Arena	12 December 2010
16	4	Shane Bourne	19 December 2010
17	5	Paul Mercurio	26 December 2010
18	6	Georgie Parker	2 January 2011

=== Season 4 (2012) ===
Who Do You Think You Are? Australia season 4 episodes
No. overall	No. in season	Guest	Original release date
19	1	Shaun Micallef	27 March 2012
20	2	Kerry O'Brien	3 April 2012
21	3	Melissa George	10 April 2012
22	4	Vince Colosimo	17 April 2012
23	5	John Wood	24 April 2012
24	6	Michael O'Loughlin	1 May 2012

=== Season 5 (2013) ===
Who Do You Think You Are? Australia season 5 episodes
No. overall	No. in season	Guest	Original release date
25	1	Adam Hills	2 April 2013
26	2	Asher Keddie	9 April 2013
27	3	Don Hany	16 April 2013
28	4	Michael Caton	23 April 2013
29	5	Lex Marinos	30 April 2013
30	6	Susie Porter	7 May 2013
31	7	Rove McManus	14 May 2013
32	8	John Howard	21 May 2013

=== Season 6 (2014) ===
Who Do You Think You Are? Australia season 6 episodes
No. overall	No. in season	Guest	Original release date
33	1	Andrew Denton	9 July 2014
34	2	Rebecca Gibney	16 July 2014
35	3	Jacki Weaver	23 July 2014
36	4	Richard Roxburgh	29 July 2014
37	5	Amanda Keller	5 August 2014
38	6	Adam Goodes	12 August 2014
39	7	Lisa McCune	18 August 2014
40	8	Paul McDermott	26 August 2014

=== Season 7 (2015) ===
Who Do You Think You Are? Australia season 7 episodes
No. overall	No. in season	Guest	Original release date
41	1	Geoffrey Rush	4 August 2015
42	2	Toni Collette	11 August 2015
43	3	Luke Nguyen	18 August 2015
44	4	David Wenham	25 August 2015
45	5	Dawn Fraser	1 September 2015
46	6	Peter Rowsthorn	8 September 2015
47	7	Greig Pickhaver	15 September 2015
48	8	Ray Martin	22 September 2015

=== Season 8 (2016) ===
Who Do You Think You Are? Australia season 8 episodes
No. overall	No. in season	Guest	Original release date
0	0	Retrospective	6 September 2016
49	1	Julia Morris	13 September 2016
50	2	Peter Garrett	20 September 2016
51	3	Delta Goodrem	27 September 2016
52	4	Mal Meninga	4 October 2016
53	5	Rachel Griffiths	11 October 2016
54	6	Shane Jacobson	18 October 2016
55	7	Jane Turner	25 October 2016
56	8	John Newcombe	1 November 2016

=== Season 9 (2018) ===
Who Do You Think You Are? Australia season 9 episodes
No. overall	No. in season	Guest	Original release date
57	1	Noni Hazlehurst	17 April 2018
58	2	Charlie Teo	24 April 2018
59	3	Natalie Imbruglia	1 May 2018
60	4	John Jarratt	8 May 2018
61	5	Justine Clarke	15 May 2018
62	6	Todd McKenney	22 May 2018
63	7	Ernie Dingo	29 May 2018
64	8	Patti Newton	5 June 2018

=== Season 10 (2019) ===
Who Do You Think You Are? Australia season 10 episodes
No. overall	No. in season	Guest	Original release date
65	1	Scott Cam	30 April 2019
66	2	Jennifer Byrne	7 May 2019
67	3	Marta Dusseldorp	14 May 2019
68	4	Karl Kruszelnicki	21 May 2019
69	5	Casey Donovan	28 May 2019
70	6	Kurt Fearnley	4 June 2019
71	7	Kerri-Anne Kennerley	11 June 2019
72	8	Rodger Corser	18 June 2019

=== Season 11 (2020) ===
Who Do You Think You Are? Australia season 10 episodes
No. overall	No. in season	Guest	Original release date
73	1	Lisa Wilkinson	19 May 2020
74	2	Bert Newton	26 May 2020
75	3	Cameron Daddo	2 June 2020
76	4	Lisa Curry	9 June 2020
77	5	Denise Scott	16 June 2020
78	6	Kat Stewart	23 June 2020
79	7	Julie Bishop	30 June 2020
80	8	Troy Cassar-Daley	7 July 2020

=== Season 12 (2021) ===
Who Do You Think You Are? Australia season 12 episodes
No. overall	No. in season	Guest	Original release date
81	1	Celia Pacquola	8 June 2021
82	2	Malcolm Turnbull	15 June 2021
83	3	Denise Drysdale	22 June 2021
84	4	Jeff Fatt	29 June 2021
85	5	Uncle Jack Charles	6 July 2021
86	6	Grant Denyer	13 July 2021
87	7	Chris Bath	20 July 2021
88	8	Natalie Bassingthwaighte	27 July 2021

=== Season 13 (2022) ===
Who Do You Think You Are? Australia season 13 episodes
No. overall	No. in season	Guest	Original release date
89	1	Simon Baker	21 June 2022
90	2	Myf Warhurst	28 June 2022
91	3	Justin Hodges	5 July 2022
92	4	Dr Chris Brown	12 July 2022
93	5	Paula Duncan	19 July 2022
94	6	Matt Moran	26 July 2022
95	7	Liz Ellis	2 August 2022
96	8	Sandra Sully	9 August 2022

=== Season 14 (2023) ===
Who Do You Think You Are? Australia season 14 episodes
No. overall	No. in season	Guest	Original release date
97	1	Barry Humphries	2 May 2023
98	2	Jenny Brockie	9 May 2023
99	3	Derryn Hinch	16 May 2023
100	4	Rhonda Burchmore	23 May 2023
101	5	Stephen Page	30 May 2023
102	6	Peter Helliar	6 June 2023
103	7	Kerry Armstrong	13 June 2023
104	8	John Waters	20 June 2023

=== Season 15 (2024) ===
Who Do You Think You Are? Australia season 15 episodes
No. overall	No. in season	Guest	Original release date
105	1	Manu Feildel	7 May 2024
106	2	Miranda Otto	14 May 2024
107	3	Kathy Lette	21 May 2024
108	4	Wayne Blair	28 May 2024
109	5	Pat Rafter	4 June 2024
110	6	Melissa Doyle	11 June 2024
111	7	Stephen Curry	18 June 2024
112	8	Heather Ewart	24 June 2024

=== Season 16 (2025) ===
Who Do You Think You Are? Australia season 16 episodes
No. overall	No. in season	Guest	Original release date
113	1	Claudia Karvan	13 May 2025
114	2	Mark Coles Smith	20 May 2025
115	3	Tom Gleeson	27 May 2025
116	4	Patrick Brammall	3 June 2025
117	5	Gina Chick	10 June 2025
118	6	Camilla Franks	17 June 2025
119	7	Marc Fennell	24 June 2025
120	8	Matt Nable	1 July 2025

=== Season 17 (2026) ===
Who Do You Think You Are? Australia season 17 episodes
No. overall	No. in season	Guest	Original release date
121	1	Bruce McAvaney	12 May 2026
122	2	Guy Sebastian	19 May 2026
123	3	Essie Davis	26 May 2026
124	4	Aaron Pedersen	2 June 2026
125	5	Chrissie Swan	9 June 2026
126	6	Curtis Stone	26 June 2026
127	7	Rosie Batty	23 June 2026
128	8	Matt Day	30 June 2026

== Events ==
The success of the series led to SBS TV and the National Archives of Australia jointly organising a Shake Your Family Tree Day on 27 February 2008 to promote genealogy.

== Home release ==
Series	Release dates			DVD Extras and Bonus Features	Number Of Discs
Series	Region 1	Region 2	Region 4	DVD Extras and Bonus Features	Number Of Discs
The Complete First Series	TBA	TBA	20 February 2008	None	2
The Complete Second Series	TBA	TBA	21 October 2009	25 minutes of additional scenes, Bonus track by John Butler	2
The Complete Third Series	TBA	TBA	12 January 2011	Magda Szubanski & Paul Mercurio – 34 minutes of additional scenes!	2
The Complete Fourth Series	TBA	TBA	9 May 2012	Celebrity Interviews, Additional Scenes: Melissa George & Shaun Micallef, Subtitles include English for the hard of hearing (Episodes only)	2
The Complete Fifth Series	TBA	TBA	3 July 2013	TBA	2
