= Diyalog TheaterFest =

Theatre festival in Berlin, Germany

Diyalog TheaterFest is a theatre festival in Berlin, Germany.
