= Who Do You Think You Are? (British TV series) =

British television series

- Genre: Documentary
- Narrated by: David Morrissey; Mark Strong; Cherie Lunghi; Phil Davis; Angela Griffin
- Theme music composer: Mark Sayer-Wade
- Composer: Theo Elwell
- Country of origin: United Kingdom
- Original language: English
- No. of series: 23
- No. of episodes: 177 (+2 specials); Specials: 11 July 2007: Adoption Special; 6 August 2014: 10 Years, 100 Shows Special; (list of episodes)

Production
- Running time: 60 minutes
- Production company: Wall to Wall

Original release
- Network: BBC Two (2004–2006); BBC One (2006–)
- Release: 12 October 2004 – present

Who Do You Think You Are? is a British genealogy documentary series that has aired on the BBC since 2004, in which celebrity participants trace their family history. It is made by the production company Wall to Wall. The programme has regularly attracted an audience of more than 6 million viewers. More than ten international adaptations of the programme have been produced.

== Episodes ==
The first two series were broadcast on BBC Two and the first was the channel's highest-rating programme of 2004. This led to episodes being shown on BBC One from the third series onwards. Mark Strong took over from David Morrissey after the first series, which was nominated for "Best Factual Series or Strand" in the 2005 BAFTAs. Cherie Lunghi was the narrator between Series 10 and 13. Phil Davis was the narrator between Series 14 and 22. In Series 23, Coronation Street actress and television presenter Angela Griffin narrated.

In the first series, the last ten minutes of each episode featured presenter Adrian Chiles and genealogical researcher Nick Barratt giving tips on tracing a family tree. In 2007, a special episode was broadcast in conjunction with the BBC's "Family Wanted" campaign featuring Nicky Campbell, who was adopted when he was just a few days old.

The theme tune was composed by Mark Sayer-Wade, who also provided the background music for earlier episodes. The music in later episodes was provided by Julian Hamlin, Edmund Jolliffe, Mark Russell and Mike MacLennan. Theo Elwell is the current composer, as of Series 20 in 2023.

== Other countries ==
The TV format of the series has proved popular around the world and the BBC has licensed it to many foreign television companies who have produced their own individual versions.

- TVP1 has aired a Polish version, called Sekrety rodzinne, which was broadcast from November 2006 to March 2007.
- In September 2007, a series of a Canadian version, consisting of 13 episodes, aired on CBC Television. In 2015, Radio-Canada produced a French version titled Qui êtes-vous?
- An Australian version aired on SBS in January 2008 after six episodes of the BBC version had been shown. The BBC programmes were those featuring Stephen Fry, Bill Oddie, Julia Sawalha, Jeremy Clarkson, Gurinder Chadha and Nigella Lawson.
- In 2008, Das Erste of ARD aired the German version titled Das Geheimnis meiner Familie (lit. 'The secret of my family'). It aired for four episodes featuring Marie-Luise Marjan, Armin Rohde, Christine Neubauer and Peter Maffay.
- Republic of Ireland's national broadcaster RTÉ has aired three series of Irish version of Who Do You Think You Are? in autumn 2008, 2009 and, after a considerable gap, 2018. The Irish version casts Ardal O'Hanlon, Dana Scallon, Rosanna Davison and Diarmuid Gavin.
- Sveriges Television, the Swedish public service broadcaster, aired a Swedish version called Vem tror du att du är? in 2009. Later that year, in May and June, they also aired the BBC episodes featuring Stephen Fry, Jeremy Irons, Nigella Lawson, John Hurt and Jane Horrocks.
- On 31 May 2009, South African station SABC2 premiered its own version, split into two parts, featuring local personalities. An American adaptation of the programme premiered on 5 March 2010 on NBC. In Britain, it began airing on BBC One on 13 June 2010.
- In 2010, the Dutch version called Verborgen Verleden (lit. 'Hidden Past') of the programme started. 19 series have been produced between 2010 and 2026. From 2005 to 2008, four series of the programme Verre Verwanten (lit. 'Distant Relatives') were broadcast on Dutch television. In 2019, a spin-off under the name Verborgen Verleden van Nederland (lit. 'Hidden Past of the Netherlands') was broadcast, which highlighted the history of various well-known locations in the Netherlands.
- In September 2010, the Danish TV station Danmarks Radio aired the first episode of the Danish version, called Ved du hvem du er?.
- In January 2011, the Norwegian TV station NRK began airing the Norwegian version, called Hvem tror du at du er?.
- Starting on 9 January 2012, Finland's national public broadcasting company, Yle, has aired 15 episodes of the Finnish version, called Kuka oikein olet?, in which local public figures searched for their origins.
- In the United States, the show premiered on NBC on 5 March 2010, with Lisa Kudrow as executive producer of the series.
- In January 2013, Czech broadcaster Czech Television began broadcasting their own version of the programme, called Tajemství rodu (lit. 'The secret of the lineage').
- In 2015, Rede Globo launched its own version of the show, entitled A Origem das Estrelas (lit. 'The Origin of the Stars'). It was released as part of the variety show Estrelas, presented by Angélica. The first celebrity to participate was Miguel Falabella.

=== International versions ===
Country	Local name	Network	Air dates
Australia	Who Do You Think You Are?	SBS One	January 2008 – present
Canada; Quebec	Who Do You Think You Are?	CBC Television	11 October 2007 – 31 January 2008
Canada; Quebec	Qui êtes-vous? (Who Are You?)	ICI Radio-Canada Télé	8 November 2013
Czech Republic	Tajemství rodu (The Secret of the Family)	ČT1	9 January 2013
Denmark	Ved du hvem du er? (Do You Know Who You Are?)	DR1	15 September 2010 – 17 March 2012
Finland	Kuka oikein olet? (Who Are You?)	Yle TV1	9 January 2012
Finland	Sukuni salat (The Secrets of My Family)	MTV3	15 February 2021 – 3 May 2021
France	Retour aux Sources (Back to the roots)	France 2	1 September 2010
Germany	Das Geheimnis meiner Familie (The Secret of My Family)	Das Erste	31 March 2008 – 28 April 2008
Ireland	Who Do You Think You Are?	RTÉ One	15 September 2008 – 19 October 2009; 6 September 2018 – present
Israel	[[:he:מי אתה חושב שאתה? (סדרת טלוויזיה ישראלית)|מי אתה חושב שאתה? (Mi Ata Hoshev She'ata?) (Who Do You Think You Are?)]]	Channel 1	4 February 2010
Netherlands	Verborgen verleden (Hidden Past)	NPO 2	29 September 2010 – present
Norway	Hvem tror du at du er? (Who Do You Think You Are?)	NRK1	January 2011 – 2017
Poland	Sekrety rodzinne (Family Secrets)	TVP1	November 2006 – March 2007
Romania	Dorință Mortală (A Death Wish)	Național 24 Plus	1 January 2019 – present
Portugal	Quem É Que Tu Pensas Que És?	RTP1	15 January 2013
Russia	Моя родословная [ru] (Moja rodoslovnaya) (My Family Tree)	Channel One Russia	1 July 2009 – 12 February 2011
South Africa	Who Do You Think You Are?	SABC2	31 May 2009
Sweden	Vem tror du att du är? (Who Do You Think You Are?)	SVT1	Spring 2009
United States	Who Do You Think You Are?	NBC (2010–12; 10 July 2022–present); TLC (2013–2018)	5 March 2010 – present

== Similar programmes ==
BBC Cymru Wales has a similar series called Coming Home, made by Yellow Duck Productions, which features celebrities with a Welsh background. In 2007, Wall to Wall Media developed You Don't Know You're Born for ITV1. The series saw various celebrities taking on their ancestors' jobs. UKTV broadcast My Famous Family in 2007. The PBS series Finding Your Roots, premiered in 2012, features celebrities discovering their ancestry through a compilation of documents called a "book of life".

A short parody sketch of the programme featured in the first series of The Armstrong & Miller Show in which Alexander Armstrong plays a fictionalised version of himself, discovering that his paternal grandfather and maternal grandmother were a child molester and a brothel-owner respectively.

Another parody sketch of the programme featured in Walliams & Friend in which Harry Enfield plays Queen Elizabeth II, who attempts to trace her family lineage.

== Home media ==
=== DVDs ===
Series 1–11, 13, 15 and 16 of Who Do You Think You Are? are all available on Region 2 DVD, whilst a box set of series 1–4 is available, distributed by Acorn Media UK. Series 1–4 are available on Region 4 DVD.

Series	Release dates		DVD extras and bonus features
Series	Region 2	Region 4	DVD extras and bonus features
1	5 March 2007	17 September 2008	Unseen Footage, First Steps to Researching Your Family
2	4 September 2007	12 November 2008	Unseen Footage
3	12 January 2009	18 March 2009	None
4	3 August 2009	20 May 2009	Special episode in conjunction with the BBC's "Family Wanted" campaign featuring Nicky Campbell, who was adopted a few days after his birth.
5	1 February 2010	TBA	Three behind-the-scenes features
6	6 September 2010	TBA	None
7	7 March 2011	TBA	None
8	20 August 2012	TBA	None
9	5 August 2013	TBA	None
10	22 September 2014	TBA	None
11	10 November 2014	TBA	Who Do They Think They Are?: 10 Years, 100 Shows
13	6 August 2018	TBA	None
15	24 September 2018	TBA	None

=== Magazines ===
In October 2007, BBC Magazines began issuing Who Do You Think You Are? Magazine, a monthly publication that includes material from the TV series.

== Awards and nominations ==
The programme was nominated for the 2010 BAFTA Television Award for Best Factual Series.
