= Kvitt eller dubbelt =

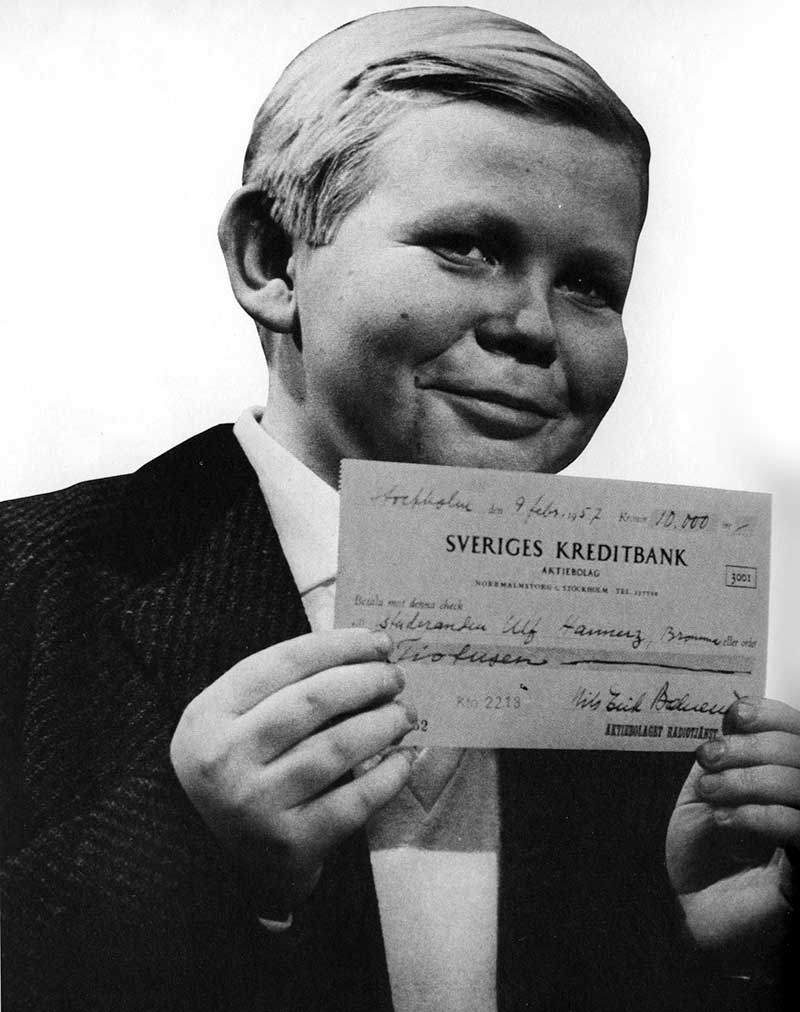
- Also known as: Tiotusenkronorsfrågan
- Genre: game show
- Country of origin: Sweden
- Original language: Swedish

Production
- Producer: Allan Schulman

Original release
- Network: Sveriges Radio-TV
- Release: January 12, 1957 – January 16, 1982

Kvitt eller dubbelt — Tiotusenkronorsfrågan (literally: Double or Nothing – The 10,000 Kronor Question) was a Swedish game show based on the American version called The $64,000 Question. It was the first game show to be broadcast on Swedish television and became one of the most watched television shows of the 1950s and 1960s. The show was hosted by Nils Erik Bæhrendtz and produced by Allan Schulman. The show was aired on SVT between 1957 until 1982. The show is one of the titles in the book Tusen svenska klassiker (2009). In each episode a number of contestants answered questions about a specific subject that they had chosen beforehand. If all questions was answered correctly they won 10,000 SEK.

Bæhrendtz's success in introducing this show, among others, resulted in him becoming program director and manager of Swedish Television in 1959. This position made him quite powerful, and he did not hesitate to fire one of Sweden's most popular television presenters, Olle Björklund, after his name appeared in a tobacco advertisement in 1961.

== The 10,000 Kronor Question ==
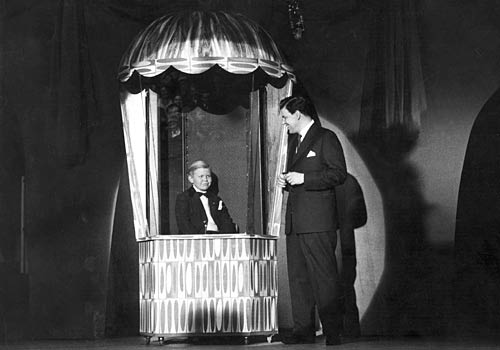
Ulf Hannerz as a boy, appearing in Kvitt eller dubbelt, with Nils Erik Bæhrendtz, 12 January 1957.

Ulf Hannerz a contestant gained some notability as a child, when he appeared on the first episode of the television game show. In the inaugural episode, aired on 12 January 1957, 14-year-old Hannerz presented by his nickname Hajen (The Shark), was quizzed on the subject tropical aquarium fish. Hannerz succeeded in winning 10,000 kronor due to a judgement error in the program. The judge asked him which of the seven displayed fish had lids. He answered "hundfisk" (mudminnow). No, the judge said, it's "slamkrypare" (mudskipper); he wanted to dismiss Hannerz from the game show. However, Hannerz was indeed correct and the name slamkrypare (mudskipper) entered the Swedish language as a term for a cocksure, but incorrect, assertion.
