= 7–9 =

- Genre: entertainment
- Country of origin: Sweden
- Original language: Swedish

Original release
- Network: SVT
- Release: 5 September 1992 – 22 May 1993

7–9 was a television entertainment programme which aired on SVT between 5 September 1992 – 22 May 1993. One of the events was Tiotusenkronorsfrågan.
