= Widell =

Widell is an ornamental surname of Swedish origin, composed of the elements Wid, coming from either vithr, "wood forest" or vid, "wide", and the Latin-derived suffix -ell. Notable people with the surname include:

- Casper Widell (born 2003), Swedish footballer
- Dave Widell (born 1965), American football player
- Doug Widell (born 1966), American football player
- Hannah Widell (born 1975), Swedish television presenter, media personality and beauty entrepreneur
- Melker Widell (born 2002), Swedish footballer

== See also ==
- Jacob Widell Zetterström (born 1998), Swedish footballer
