= Amanda Schulman =

Swedish television producer and media-personality

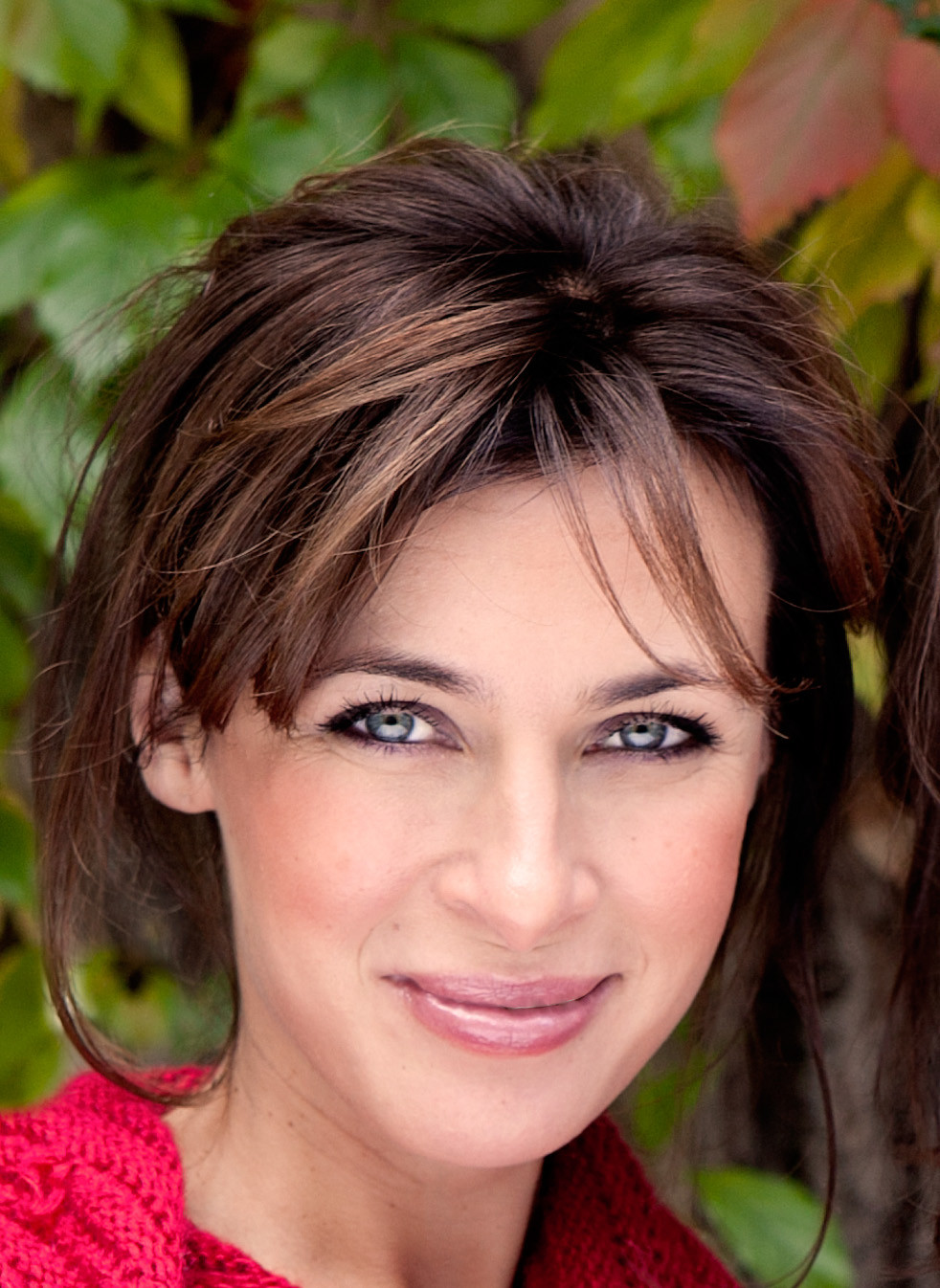
- Schulman in 2013
- Born: Amanda Maria Linnea Sunnanäng Widell; 15 May 1980 (age 45); Stockholm, Sweden
- Spouse: Alex Schulman (m. 2010)
- Children: 3
- Parent(s): Bengt Widell; Stina Stjernberg
- Relatives: Hannah Widell (sister); Gunny Widell (grandmother)

Amanda Maria Linnea Sunnanäng Schulman (née Widell; 15 May 1980) is a Swedish television producer and media-personality. Schulman has worked in different fields within media and television, within the production company Mastiff she has been the manager for character driven programs. Along with her sister Hannah Widell she runs the production company Perfect day since 2011. At the newspaper Aftonbladets website the two sisters runs the lifestyle project C/O Hannah och Amanda, which included blogs and the web-TV show Middag med Hannah & Amanda. In 2012, the concept was expanded with the magazine C/O Hannah & Amanda which is released once a month. Together they also have the podcast Fredagspodden med Hannah och Amanda.

She is one of five daughters born to Bengt Widell (son of Gunny Widell) and Stina Stjernberg.

Amanda Schulman is married to Alex Schulman Together the couple have two daughters Charlie (2009) and Frances (2012) and son Louis (2017).
