= Helena Wulff =

Swedish anthropologist (born 1954)

Helena Wulff (born February 7, 1954) is professor of social anthropology at Stockholm University. Her research is in the anthropology of communication and aesthetics based on a wide range of studies of the social worlds of literary production, dance, and the visual arts.

== Academic work ==
While Wulff early research was on youth culture and ethnicity, her specialist skills include expressive cultural form (dance, art, images, text) in a transnational perspective, visual culture, the emotions, and media, as well as anthropological methods. She has conducted field studies in Stockholm, London, New York City, Frankfurt-am-Main, and Ireland (mostly Dublin). Wulff's current research is on migrant writing in Sweden. Drawing on her research, she teaches courses on Media anthropology, Visual Culture, Communication and Aesthetics, Anthropological Writing Genres, and Anthropological Methods.

Wulff has held visiting professorships at University of Illinois at Urbana-Champaign, National University of Singapore, University of Vienna, and University of Ulster, as well as a Leverhulme visiting professorship at University of East London. She was Editor-in-Chief (with Dorle Dracklé) of Social Anthropology/Anthropologie Sociale, the journal of the European Association of Social Anthropologists (EASA), and Vice President of EASA. She was Chair of the Swedish Anthropological Association (SANT). Wulff is a member of the steering committee of the multidisciplinary research programme Cosmopolitan and Vernacular Dynamics in World Literatures, funded by the Swedish Foundation for Humanities and Social Sciences 2016-2021.

Wulff is an editor (with Deborah Reed-Danahay) of the book series “Palgrave Studies in Literary Anthropology” (Palgrave, New York), and editor (with Jonathan Skinner) of the book series “Dance and Performance Studies” Berghahn Books, Oxford, and a member of the advisory boards of the journals Anthropologica, Anthropological Journal of European Cultures, AnthroVision, Cultural Sociology, Culture Unbound, and Social Anthropology/Anthropologie Sociale.

Wulff serves on the Austrian Academy of Sciences Research Board as of 2026.

== Selected works ==
=== Books ===
- 2017: Rhythms of Writing: An Anthropology of Irish Literature. London: Bloomsbury.
- 2016: The Anthropologist as Writer: Genres and Contexts in the Twenty-First Century. Oxford: Berghahn Books. Editor.
- 2010: Ethnographic Practice in the Present. Oxford: Berghahn Books. Editor with Marit Melhuus and Jon Mitchell.
- 2007: Dancing at the Crossroads: Memory and Mobility in Ireland. Oxford: Berghahn Books.

=== Journal articles, book chapters and encyclopedia entries ===
- 2018: “Diversifying from Within: Diaspora Writings in Sweden,” in Morten Nielsen and Nigel Rapport (eds.), The Composition of Anthropology: How Anthropological Texts are Written. London: Routledge, pp. 122–136.
- 2018: “Foreword,” in Lauren Miller Griffith and Jonathan S. Marion (eds.), Apprenticeship Pilgrimage: Developing Expertise through Travel and Training. Lanham: Lexington Books, pp. vii-xi.
- 2017: “Stories of the Soil: In the Irish Literary World,” in Diarmuid Ó Giolláin and Martine Segalen (eds.), Irish Ethnologies. Notre Dame: University of Notre Dame Press, pp. 141–157.
- 2017: “Greater than Its Size: Ireland in Literature and Life,” in Ulf Hannerz and Andre Gingrich (eds.), Small Countries: Structures and Sensibilities. Philadelphia: University of Pennsylvania Press, pp. 301–316.
- 2017: ”Manhattan as a Magnet: Place and Circulation among Young Swedes,” in Virginia R. Dominguez and Jasmin Habib (eds.), America Observed: On an International Anthropology of the United States. Oxford: Berghahn, pp. 31–50.
- 2017: “Global spridning av lokala teman,” Review article of Crime Fiction as World Literature edited by Louise Nilsson, David Damrosh and Theo D´haen (Bloomsbury 2017). Respons, nr 6, pp 66–68.
