= Baltic Sea Science Center =

Education center in Stockholm

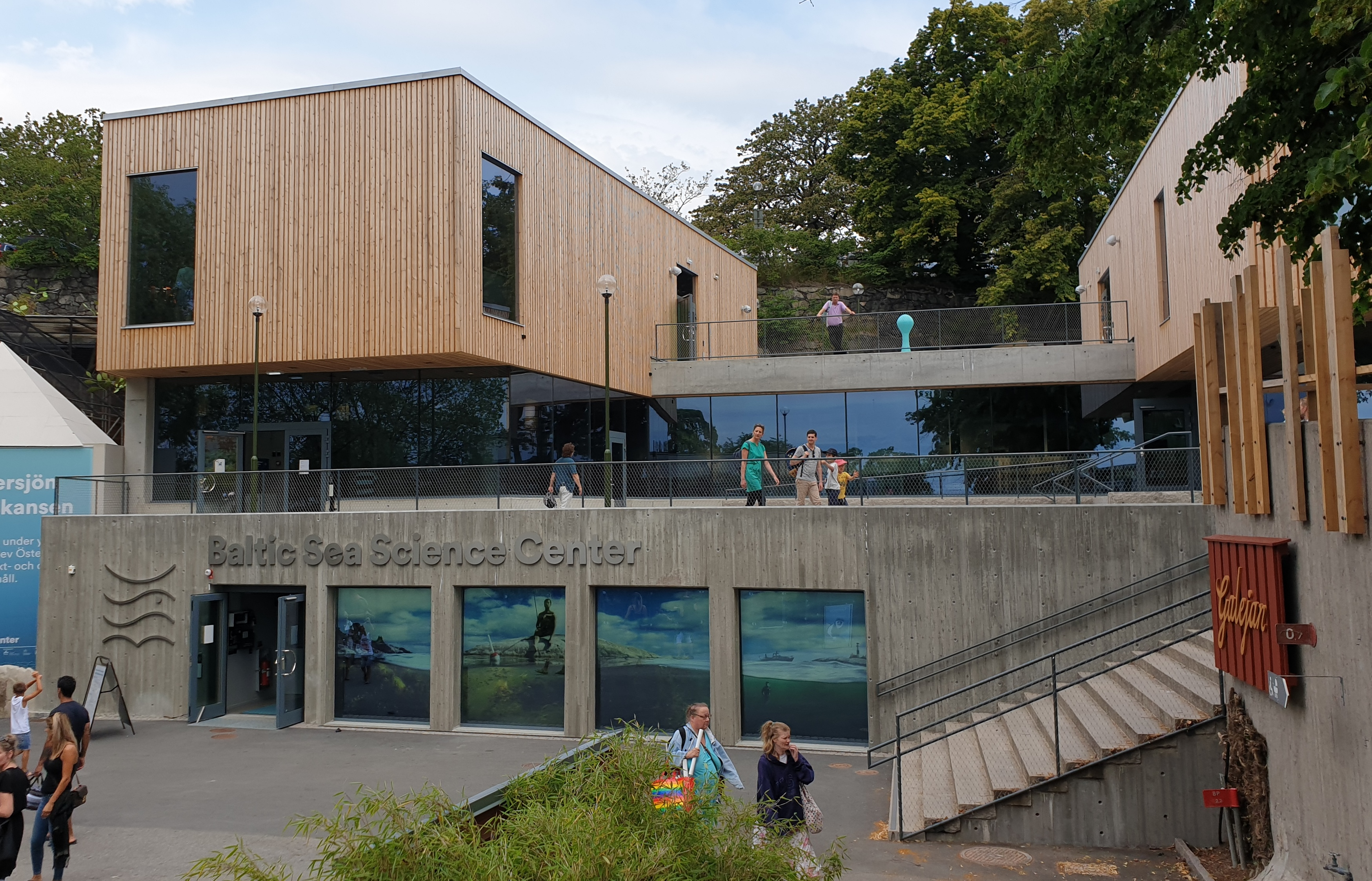
- Interactive map of Baltic Sea Science Center
- 59.324°N 18.104°E
- Date opened: 12 April 2019
- Location: Djurgårdsslätten 49-51; Skansen, Stockholm, Sweden
- Land area: 2000 square meters
- No. of species: 45
- Volume of largest tank: 250,000 liters
- Director: Anna Björn
- Public transit: Skansen, Djurgårdslinjen
- Website: skansen.se

The Baltic Sea Science Center in Stockholm is part of the open-air museum Skansen, and showcases the Baltic marine environment and its threats, using aquariums, exhibitions, and educational activities.

== Construction ==
The seeds of this project were in 2011, when the Baltic Sea 2020 foundation, established by Björn Carlson, began discussing with the museum Skansen the possibility of constructing a marine education centre. Planning began in March 2015, and construction started in 2016. The exhibits and content were developed in collaboration with Stockholm University and the Swedish University of Agricultural Sciences in Uppsala.

The Baltic Sea Science Center is located in Lower Solliden, in the southern part of the Skansen area. The area was designed by Holger Blom and the site for the center is the 1965 former sea lion and flamingo pool. The 2,000 square meter building, designed by Katarina Wahlström, has five floors, one underground. The ground floor is cast-in-place concrete and houses the aquariums, the floor above is glazed, and the top two floors are two wooden structures. The BSSC opened on 12 April 2019.

== Exhibits ==
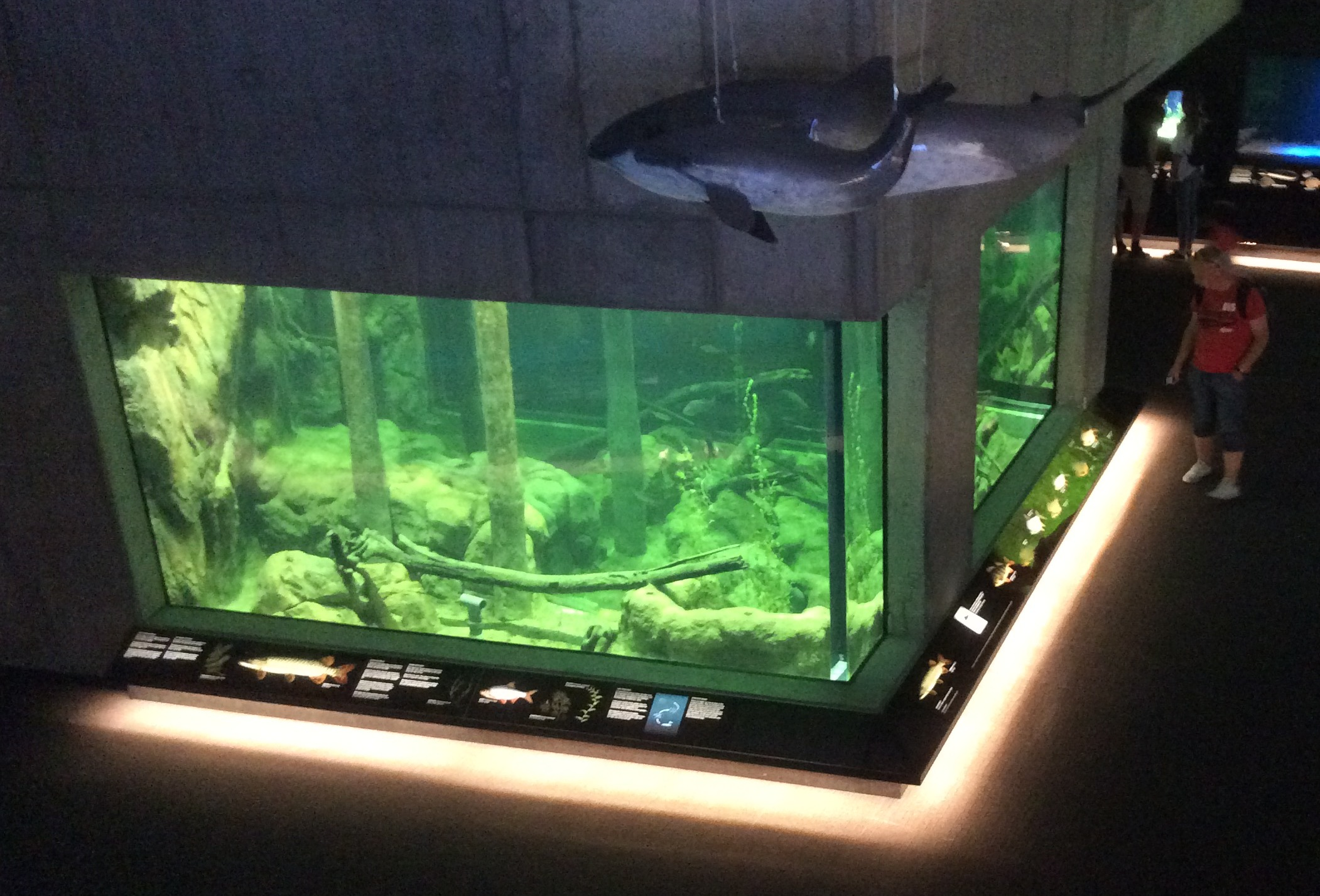
Aquarium in the Baltic Sea Science Center, holding freshwater fishes, with models of harbour porpoises suspended above

The Baltic Sea Science Center contains educational displays, marine and freshwater aquaria, and a teaching area and laboratory. One large aquarium displays the two subspecies of Atlantic and Baltic herring (Clupea harengus and Clupea harengus membras). Another holds freshwater fishes such as pike, rudd, tench, and perch. The largest, with a capacity of 250,000 liters and a walk-through tunnel, holds predatory fish such as cod, flatfish, eels, salmon, and sturgeons.

The displays, aimed at high school audience, explain, that the Baltic Sea is a shallow brackish body of water surrounded by 90 million people, and is threatened by overfishing, eutrophication, depleted diversity, and environmental toxins.
