= Ulf Hannerz =

Swedish anthropologist (born 1942)

- Born: June 9, 1942 (age 84); Malmö, Sweden
- Spouse: Helena Wulff
- Awards: Anders Retzius Medal in Gold (2010)

Academic background
- Education: Stockholm University (BA); Indiana University Bloomington (MA); Stockholm University (PhD)
- Thesis: Soulside: Inquiries into Ghetto Culture and Community (1969)

Academic work
- Discipline: Anthropology
- Institutions: Stockholm University

Ulf Hannerz (born June 9, 1942, in Malmö) is a Swedish anthropologist known for his pioneering work on globalization, urban anthropology, multi-sited ethnography, and cultural theory. He is currently professor emeritus of Social Anthropology at Stockholm University. He was previously Chair of the European Association of Social Anthropologists, Director of the Swedish Collegium for Advanced Study, and Editor for Ethnos.

Hannerz was heralded for the breadth and prescience of his scholarship on an increasingly interconnected world and has been ranked among the most influential anthropologists of the late 20th and early 21st centuries. For his contributions, he has been made an honorary fellow of the Royal Anthropological Institute of Great Britain and Ireland, and elected as a member of the Royal Swedish Academy of Sciences, American Academy of Arts and Sciences, and the Austrian Academy of Sciences. He is also the recipient of a Retzius Medal (now gold medal) from the Swedish Society for Anthropology and Geography and an honorary doctorate from University of Oslo. Hannerz has delivered the Lewis Henry Morgan Lecture at the University of Rochester and the Daphne Berdahl Memorial Lecture at the University of Minnesota.

== Early life ==
Hannerz was born in Malmö on 9 June 1942. His family moved to Stockholm when he was a toddler. He grew up in the Södra Ängby neighborhood of western Stockholm. At the age of 14, he became a minor celebrity in Sweden when he appeared on the first episode of the television game show Kvitt eller dubbelt - 10.000 kronorsfrågan (literally: Double or Nothing - The 10,000 Kronor Question), which was based on the American television show The $64,000 Question. Hannerz was introduced with a nickname, Hajen (The Shark) and quizzed on "tropical aquarium fish." At one point, the judge asked him which of seven displayed fish had eyelids. He answered—correctly—"hundfisk" (mudminnow). "No," the judge said, "it's slamkrypare (mudskipper)." Hannerz would receive the 10,000 kronor prize despite the error, and in turn, slamkrypare (mudskipper) entered the Swedish language as a term for a cocksure, but incorrect, assertion.

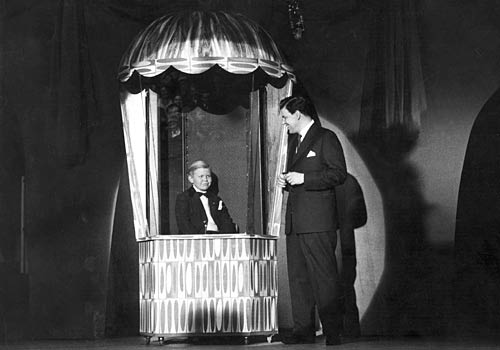
Ulf Hannerz as a boy, appearing in Kvitt eller dubbelt, with Nils Erik Bæhrendtz, January 12, 1957

Around 1960, Hannerz made his first trips to West Africa at a time when many African nations were gaining independence from colonial empires. He would later credit this experience with inspiring his decision to pursue the study of anthropology.

== Education ==
Hannerz matriculated at Stockholm University, where he originally planned to study zoology. His plans changed, however, when he took a course on ethnography. He would spend the subsequent years as a regular presence at the Department of Comparative and General Ethnography, earning a BA in 1963. He then moved to the United States to study at Indiana University Bloomington. He completed an MA in Anthropology there in 1966. The following years would see him move back and forth between Sweden and the United States, as he would do two years of ethnographic fieldwork among African-Americans in Washington, DC for the dissertation that would earn him a PhD at Stockholm University in 1969. That same year, he published Soulside: Inquiries into Ghetto Culture and Community, a monograph based on research in the United States.

== Career ==
Hannerz join the Department of Social Anthropology at Stockholm University in 1976 as an acting professor. He was promoted to Professor in 1981. He is credited with strengthening and diversifying the research at the Department of Social Anthropology, which became a hub for research on "unconventional" anthropological topics like the tech sector, ballet dancers, the internet, and pension reform.

== Personal life ==
Hannerz is married to fellow anthropologist Helena Wulff.

== Books ==
- (1969, 2004) Soulside: Inquiries into Ghetto Culture and Community 2004: ISBN 0-226-31576-2
- (1974) Caymanian Politics: Structure and Style in a Changing Island Society
- (1980) Exploring the City: Inquiries Toward an Urban Anthropology, ISBN 0-231-08376-9
  - (2006) Spanish translation: La exploracion de la ciudad, ISBN 84-375-0369-8
- (1992) Cultural Complexity: Studies in the Social Organization of Meaning
- (1996) Transnational Connections: Culture, People, Places
  - (1998) Spanish translation: Conexiones transnacionales - Cultura, gente, lugares, ISBN 84-376-1629-8
  - (2006) Polish translation: Powiązania transnarodowe: kultura, ludzie, miejsca, ISBN 83-233-2183-3
- (2000, with Kjell Goldmann, Ulf Hannerz, Charles Westin, eds.) Nationalism and Internationalism in the Post-Cold War Era
- (2000) Flows, Boundaries and Hybrids: Keywords in Transnational Anthropology
- (1992) Culture, Cities and the World
- (1986, with Ulla Wagner) Anthropology of Immigration in Sweden
- (2004) Foreign News: Exploring the World of Foreign Correspondents
- (2010) Anthropology's World: Life in a Twenty-First Century Discipline ISBN 978-0-7453-3047-1
- (2016) Writing Future Worlds: An Anthropologist Explores Global Scenarios. New York.
- (2017) Small Countries: Structures and Sensibilities. (ed., with Andre Gingrich) Philadelphia.
- (2019) World Watching: Streetcorners and Newsbeats on a Journey through Anthropology. London.
- (2021) Afropolitan Horizons: Essays toward a Literary Anthropology of Nigeria.
