= Alex Schulman =

Swedish author, columnist and podcaster (born 1976)

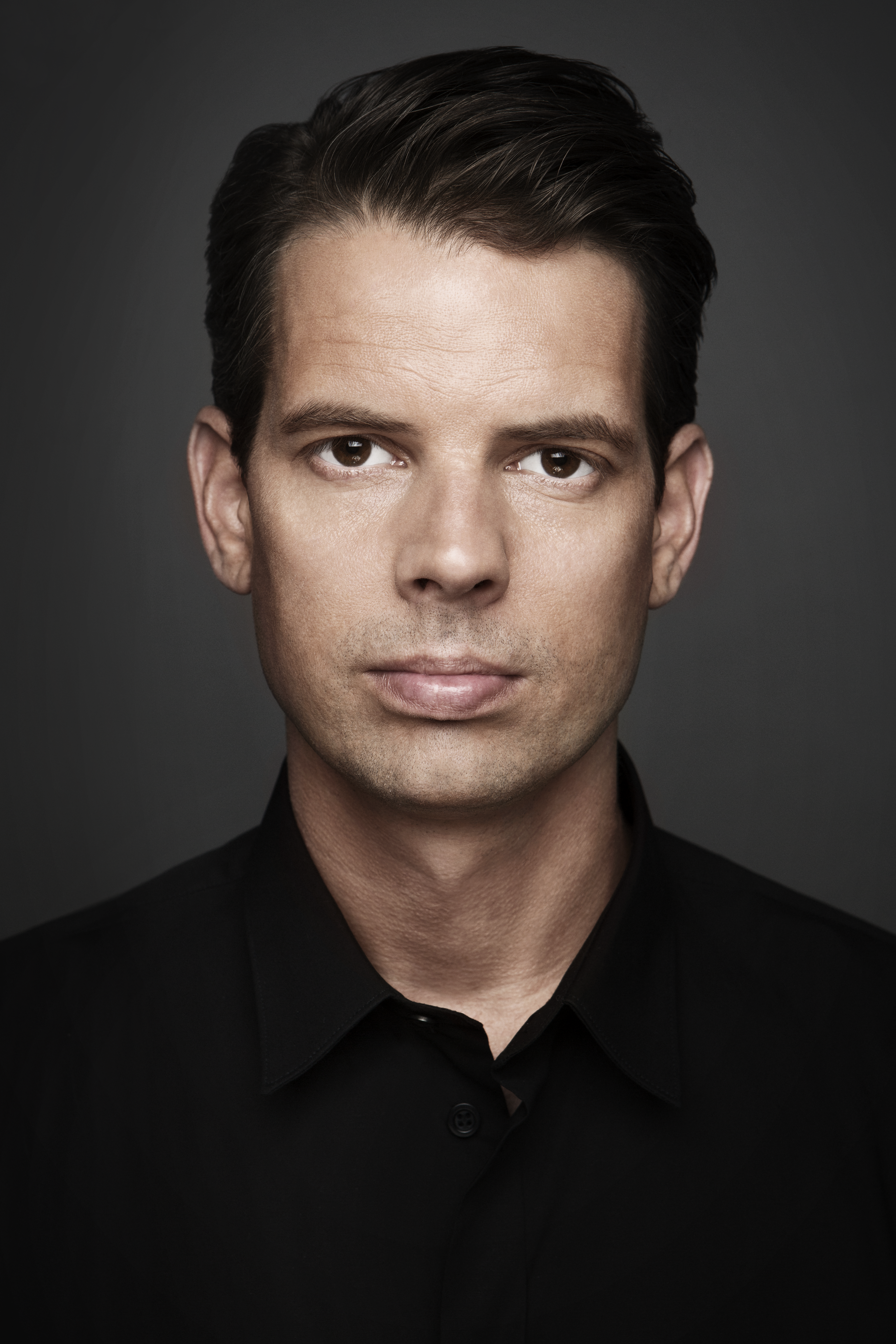
- Alex Schulman in May 2015
- Born: Carl Magnus Alexander Schulman; 17 February 1976 (age 50); Hemmesdynge, Sweden
- Occupations: Journalist, blogger, author
- Spouses: Katrin Zytomierska (m. 2007; div. 2008) Amanda Widell (m. 2010)
- Children: 3
- Parents: Allan Schulman; Lisette Stolpe

Carl Magnus Alexander Schulman (born 17 February 1976 in Hemmesdynge) is a Swedish author, journalist, blogger and television and radio personality.

His career started when he created the website Stureplan.se in 2005. The same year he had a reoccurring feature on the Swedish TV show Postkodmiljonären on TV4 alongside his brother Calle Schulman. Alex Schulman started a blog in 2006 and was hired by Aftonbladet shortly thereafter. He wrote blog posts, released books and later became show host. In 2012 he started the podcast Alex & Sigges podcast together with Sigge Eklund.

== Biography ==
Alex Schulman is the son of Finnish-born television producer and journalist Allan Schulman and the television host Lisette Schulman (née Stolpe). He is also a maternal grandson of the author Sven Stolpe. He has two brothers: Carl Johan (Calle) and Niklas Schulman. Together with his brother Calle he runs the company Schulmangruppen ("The Schulman Group"). He also has four older half-siblings from his father's first marriage.

Alex Schulman was born in Skåne but lived in Uddeholm and Gröndal (Stockholm) before his family moved to Farsta. He studied film, literary science and philosophy at Stockholm University.

== Private life ==
Alex Schulman has, since 2010, been married to Amanda Schulman (née Widell), and the couple have two daughters and one son together. Schulman was married twice before, to Katrin Zytomierska and Olivia Rieke.

== Media ==
Magazines

Schulman started as a film critic for the local newspaper Södersvepet. He later worked for Se & Hör and held a translating position for SDI media. Since July 2016 Alex writes weekly columns for Expressen.

Websites and blogs

Between 2005 and 2007 Schulman was the chief editor of the website www.stureplan.se. Schulman wrote a blog for Aftonbladet which he canceled on October 1, 2007.

On April 1, 2008, Alex and Calle Schulman started the website 1000 apor, which was announced bankrupt due to lacking profitability on June 17, 2009. They described themselves as having "Sweden's biggest humor site", but on his private blog Alex mixed humor with general topics as well as politics.

Between 2009 and 2010 Schulman authored the blog Att vara Charlie Schulmans pappa (To be Charlie Schulman's father) which had 200 000 weekly readers.

TV, radio and podcasts

Between 2009 and 2011 Schulman hosted his first talk show, Schulman Show, which broadcast through Aftonbladet's website. In 2012 the show was picked up by television and aired on Swedish channel 5. In the fall of 2010 Schulman hosted Paradise Hotel.

Schulman participated in the radio show Äntligen morgon med Adam & Gry on Mix Megapol on a weekly basis, with the feature "Fönster mot mediavärlden" (A window to the world of media) between 2006 and 2015.

In 2012 Schulman created the podcast Alex & Sigges podcast together with the writer Sigge Eklund. The podcast won Best Original Channel as well as Best Swedish Channel in Svenska podradiopriset (The Swedish Podcast radio Awards) in 2012.

Literature

In April 2009 Schulman released the book Hurry to Love, a novel dedicated to his father Allan Schulman, who died in 2003. In January 2011 Schulman released To Be With Her, a tribute to his wife Amanda Schulman. In 2016 Forget Me was released, a book where he tells the reader about his search for reconciliation with his alcoholic mother. At the Swedish Book Fair in Gothenburg Forget Me was named Book of the Year 2017.

Stage shows

In 2012 Schulman made his stage debut with the show "Älska Mig" (Love Me), a show that tackled the need for affirmation in contemporary society. In 2015 Schulman and Sigge Eklund made the show "Meningen med Livet" (The Meaning of Life) for Cirkus in Stockholm, a show that later toured the country. January 26, 2017 their second show "LIVE" premiered at Rival in Stockholm.

Film

In 2026, Schulman directed a dark comedy film Adult Supervision on his own script. It was also selected as the Swedish entry for the Best International Feature Film at the 99th Academy Awards.

== Bibliography ==
- 2007 – Privat: mejlkorrespondens (together with Carolina Gynning), Damm, ISBN 978-91-7351-091-2
- 2009 – Hurry to Love, Forum, ISBN 978-91-37-13417-8
- 2010 – Bajsfesten, Rabén & Sjögren, ISBN 978-91-29-67552-8
- 2011 – To Be With Her, Piratförlaget, ISBN 978-91-64-20347-2
- 2015 – Tid: livet är inte kronologiskt (together with Sigge Eklund), Bookmark Förlag, ISBN 978-91-8744192-9
- 2016 – Forget Me, Bookmark förlag, ISBN 9789188171887
- 2017 – Rum: en roadtrip genom psyket (together with Sigge Eklund), Bookmark Förlag, ISBN 978-91-88-34557-8
- 2018 – Burn All My Letters, Bookmark Förlag, ISBN 9789188745149
- 2020 – The Survivors, Albert Bonniers Förlag. Libris link. ISBN 9789100182496
- 2022 – Malma Station
- 2025 – June 17th

== TV-programmes ==
- Äntligen Hi-Tech on TV4
- Veckans kanin on TV3 (host)
- Paradise hotel (fall 2010) on TV6 (host)
- Schulman show on Kanal 5 and via Aftonbladet's webb-TV

== Theatre ==
=== Director ===
Year	Production	Creator	Theatre
2021	Tröstrapporter	Alex Schulman	Dramaten
