= Lisette Schulman =

Swedish television host and politician

- Born: 13 June 1951; Karlskoga Church Parish
- Died: 19 February 2015 (aged 63); Oscar Parish
- Children: Alex Schulman, Calle Schulman

Astrid Maria Elisabet "Lisette" Schulman (née Stolpe; 13 June 1951 in Karlskoga – 19 February 2015) was a Swedish television host and politician.

She was the widow of television producer Allan Schulman. She was the mother of media personalities Alex Schulman and Calle Schulman. She also had a third child, Niklas Schulman.

Schulman was television host of 1970s shows such as Sveriges Magasin, with Lasse Holmqvist, and in Pappa vet bäst?, with Stellan Sundahl on Sveriges Television. At the end of the 1990s, she was a politician for Kristdemokraterna in Varberg Municipality.

She participated in the first episode of Swedish television show På spåret together with actor Evert Lindkvist and archaeologist Anna-Lena Segestam in 1987.
