= Allan Schulman =

Swedish/Finnish journalist and producer

- Born: Carl Allan Rudolf Schulman; 15 September 1919; Helsinki, Finland
- Died: 12 July 2003 (aged 83); Stockholm, Sweden
- Occupations: Journalist; Television producer
- Spouses: Eva Tawaststjerna (m. 1945; div. 1974) Lisette Stolpe (m. 1974)
- Children: Jannecke; Leif; Micaela; Annika; Niklas; Alex; Calle
- Parents: Morgan Schulman; Tyyni Schulman (née Krank)

Carl Allan Rudolf Schulman (15 September 1919 – 12 July 2003) was a Swedish and Swedish-speaking Finnish journalist and television producer.

== Life and career ==
Carl Allan Rudolf Schulman was born on 15 September 1919 in Helsinki, Finland, to Carl Allan Morgan Schulman and Tyyni Ilta Helena Schulman (née Krank).

He worked as journalist and managing editor at different Finland Swedish newspapers and local radio stations in Finland between 1941 and 1951, and as producer at YLE between 1950 and 1953. In 1953, he moved to Stockholm to work at Radiotjänst, where he first served as producer and from 1958 as managing producer. As producer he produced Frukostklubben with Sigge Fürst as host. Between 1962 and 1965, he worked as TV producer. During the following years he worked as director of communications at the Swedish Red Cross. Between 1967 and 1984, he worked at Sveriges Radio/Sveriges Television as producer for Kvitt eller dubbelt, Hylands hörna and more.

Schulman also a played a role in the 1982 film Flight of the Eagle directed by Jan Troell. He was editor in chief for the Jewish magazine Menorah.

Schulman was married to the journalist Eva Lilian Enneli Tawaststjerna (1925–2012) between 1945 and 1974 and together they had four children, Jannecke, Leif, Micaela and Annika (married Åslund). In 1974, he married the journalist Astrid Maria Elisabet "Lisette" Stolpe and together they had three children, Niklas, Alex and Calle.

Schulman died on 12 July 2003 in Stockholm, Sweden, aged 83.
