= Seglora =

Settlement in Borås Municipality, Sweden

Coordinates: 57°35′N 12°44′E

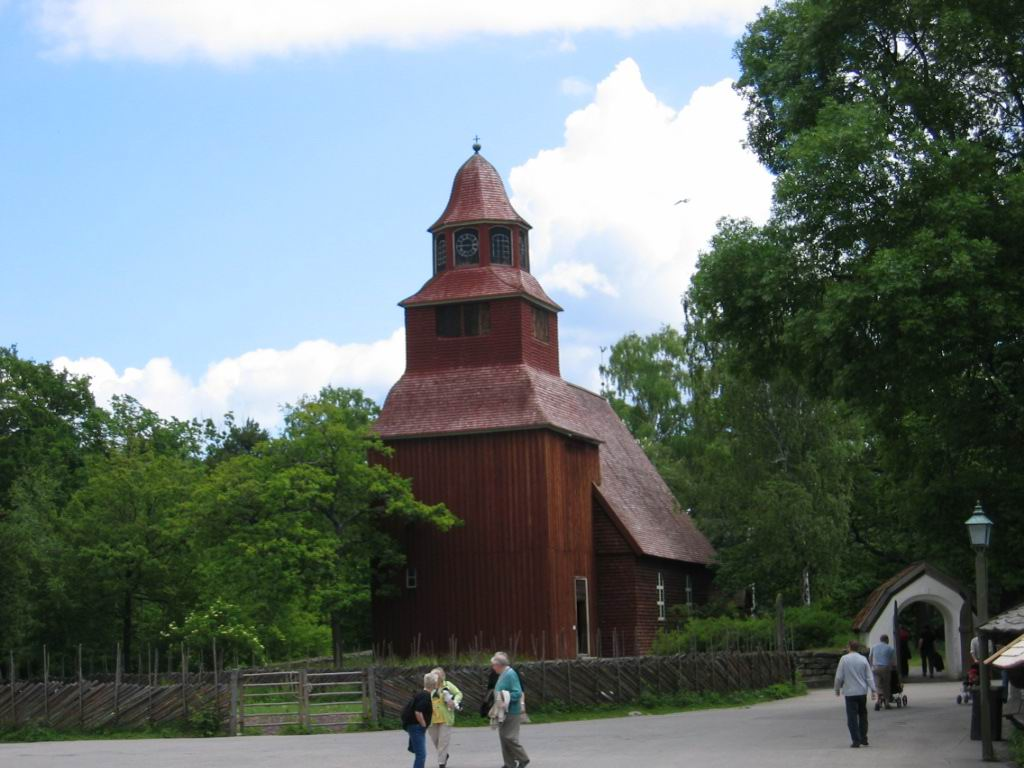
Old Seglora Church at Skansen.

Seglora (Swedish pronunciation: [ˈsêːˌɡluːra]) is the most rural part of the Borås Municipality. It is bordering to Mark Municipality and Bollebygd Municipality in western Sweden.

Seglora as a locality is not very well known in Sweden, but most Swedes know of the Seglora Church that can be found at Skansen. The Church there was sold to Skansen in 1916, and in 1918 the church was reopened at its new locality.
