= Skansen =

Open-air museum in Sweden

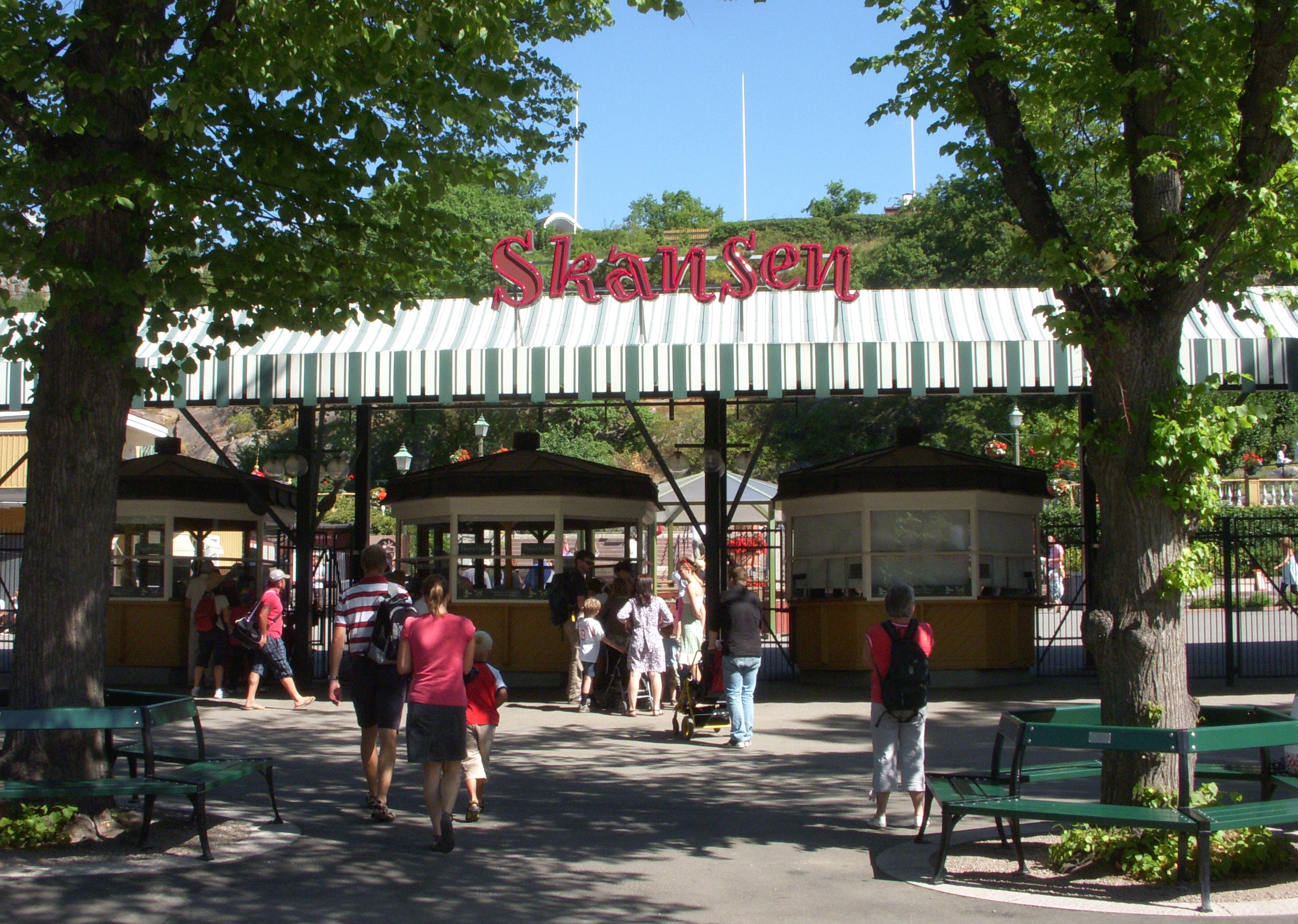
- Main entrance
- Established: 11 October 1891
- Location: Djurgården, Stockholm, Sweden
- Coordinates: 59°19′34″N 18°06′13″E
- Type: Open-air living museum and zoo
- Visitors: 1,369,431 (2016)
- Director: John Brattmyhr
- Website: www.skansen.se/en/

Skansen (Swedish: [ˈskǎnːsɛn]; "the Sconce") is the oldest open-air museum and zoo in Sweden located on the island Djurgården in Stockholm, Sweden. It was opened on 11 October 1891 by Artur Hazelius (1833–1901) to show the way of life in the different parts of Sweden before the industrial era.

The term "skansen" has become a generic term referring to other open-air museums and collections of historic structures, particularly in Central and Eastern Europe, but also in the United States, e.g. Old World Wisconsin and Fairplay, Colorado.

== History ==
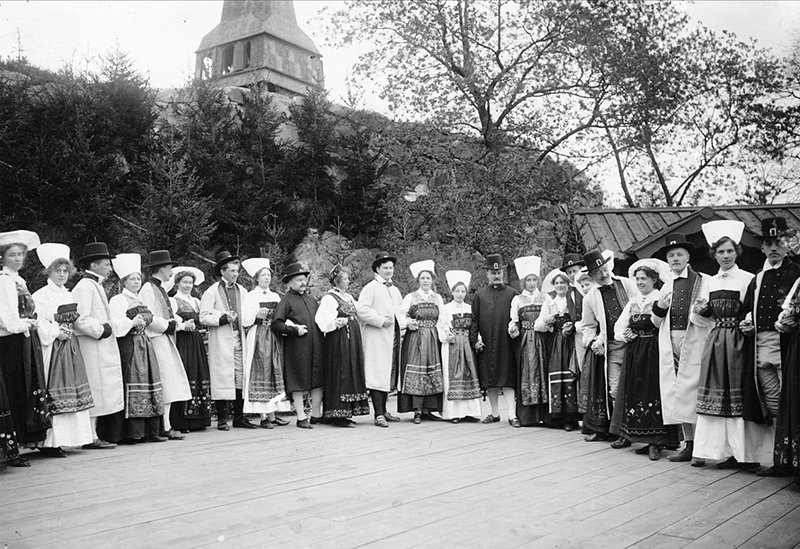
Folk dance at Skansen in 1904.

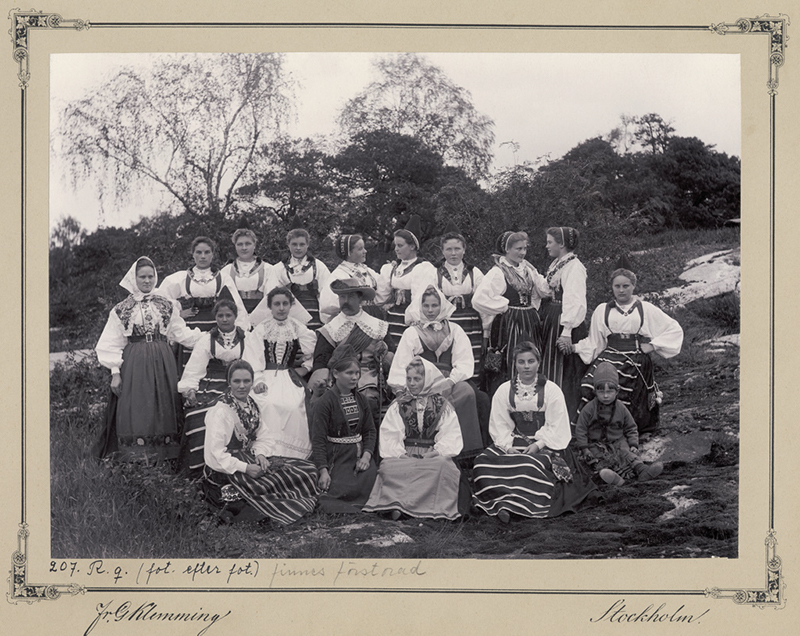
Skansen staff in 1896.

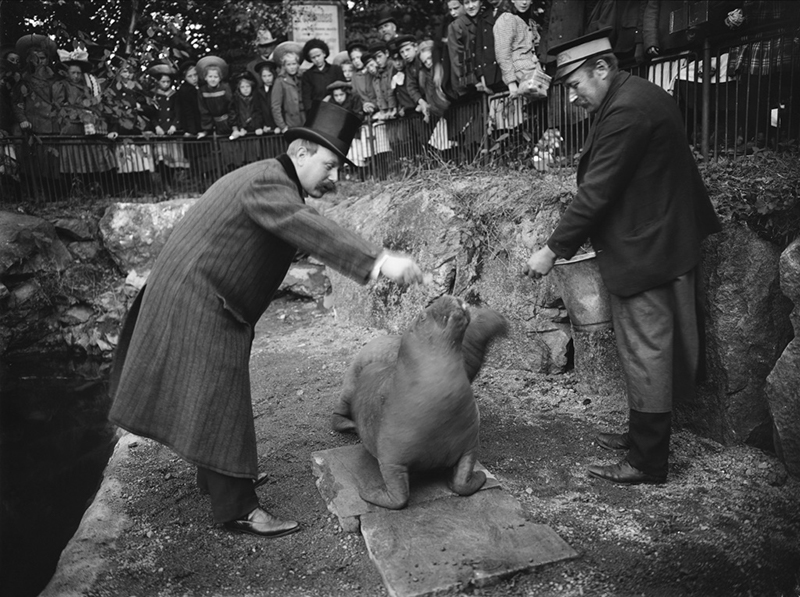
Walrus being fed at Skansen, 1908.

The 19th century was a period of great change throughout Europe, and Sweden was no exception. Its rural way of life was rapidly giving way to an industrialised society and many feared that the country's many traditional customs and occupations might be lost to history. Artur Hazelius, who had previously founded the Nordic Museum on the island of Djurgården near the centre of Stockholm, created his open-air museum on the hill that dominates the island. Skansen became the model for other early open-air museums in Scandinavia and later ones elsewhere.

Skansen was originally a part of the Nordic Museum, but became an independent organisation in 1963. The objects within the Skansen buildings are still the property of the Nordic Museum.

After extensive travelling, Hazelius bought around 150 houses from all over the country (as well as one structure from Telemark in Norway) and had them shipped piece by piece to the museum, where they were rebuilt to provide a unique picture of traditional Sweden. Only three of the buildings in the museum are not original, and were painstakingly copied from examples he had found. All of the buildings are open to visitors and show the full range of Swedish life from the Skogaholm Manor house built in 1680, to the 16th century Älvros farmhouses.

== The open-air museum ==
Skansen attracts more than 1.3 million visitors each year. The many exhibits over the 75 acre (300,000 m²) site include a full replica of an average 19th-century town, in which craftsmen in traditional dress such as tanners, shoemakers, silversmiths, bakers and glass-blowers demonstrate their skills in period surroundings. There is even a small patch growing tobacco used for the making of cigarettes. There is also an open-air zoo containing a wide range of Scandinavian animals including the brown bear, moose, grey seal, Eurasian lynx, Arctic fox, otter, reindeer, harbour seal, Eurasian eagle owl, great grey owl and wolverine, as well as some non-Scandinavian animals. There are also farmsteads where rare breeds of farm animals can be seen.

In early December the site's central Bollnäs square is host to a popular Christmas market that has been held since 1903, attracting around 25,000 visitors each weekend. In the summer there are displays of folk dancing and concerts.

== Funicular railway ==
Since 1897, Skansen has been served by the Skansens Bergbana, a funicular railway on the northwest side of the Skansen hill. The funicular is 196.4 meters long, with a total rise of 34.57 meters.

Skansen is also served by trams on line 7.

== Keepers of Skansen ==
Year	Keeper
1891–1901	Artur Hazelius
1901–1905	Gunnar Hazelius
1905–1912	Bernhard Salin
1913–1928	Gustaf Upmark
1929–1955	Andreas Lindblom
1956–1968	Gösta Berg
1969–1982	Nils Erik Baehrendtz
1982–1991	Eva Nordenson
1992–1994	Hans Alfredson
1995–2005	Anna-Greta Leijon
2005–2023	John Brattmyhr
2023–	Maria Groop Russel

== Gallery ==
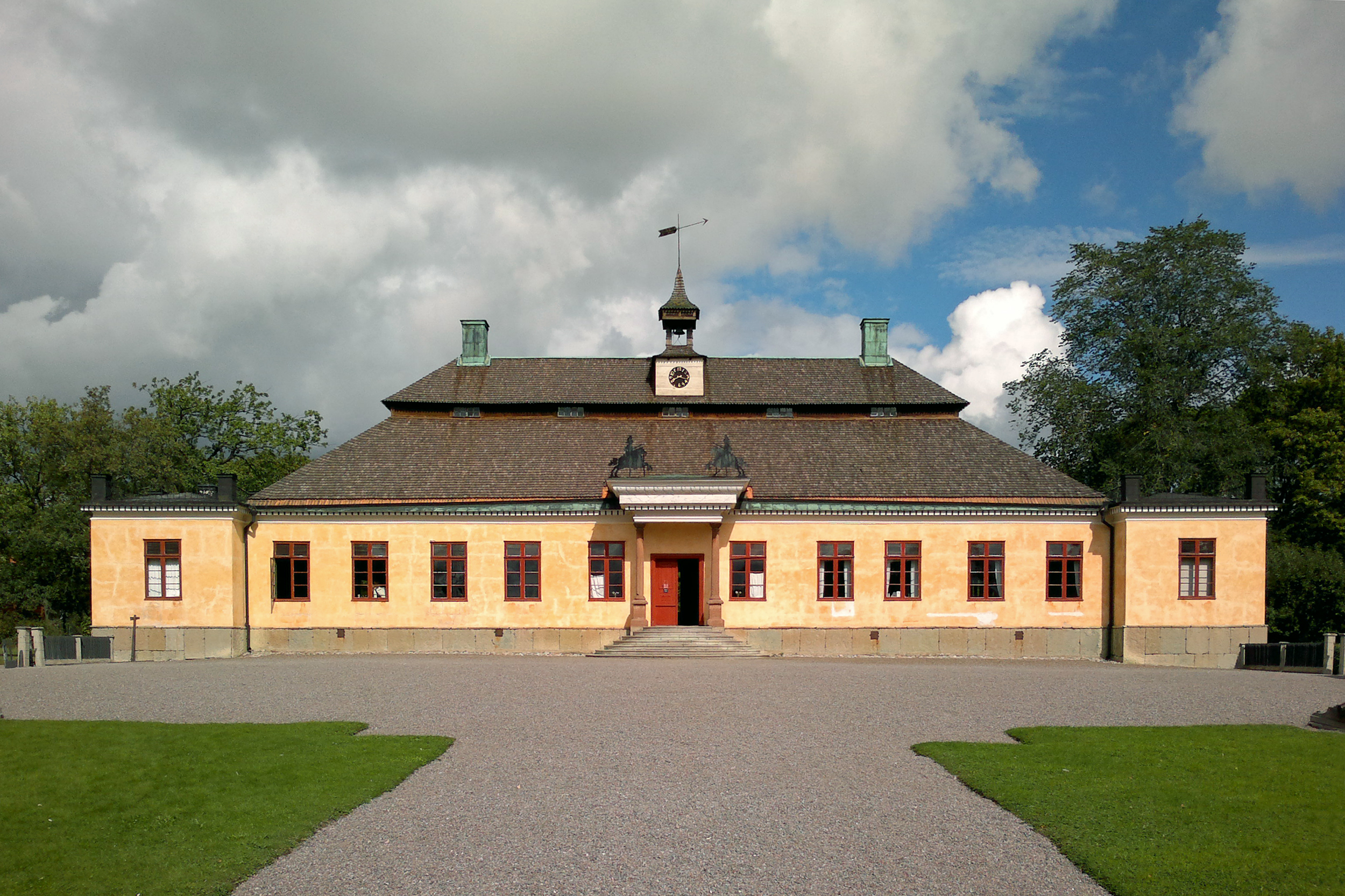
Skogaholm Manor

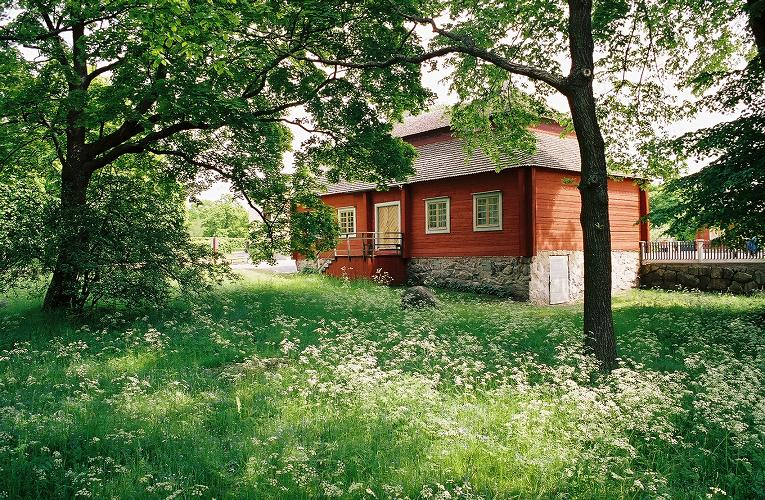
The west wing of Skogaholm Manor in early summer. It contains a library, china pantry and five guest rooms.

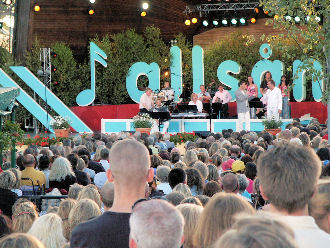
Allsång på Skansen ("Sing-along at Skansen") is a popular annual event.

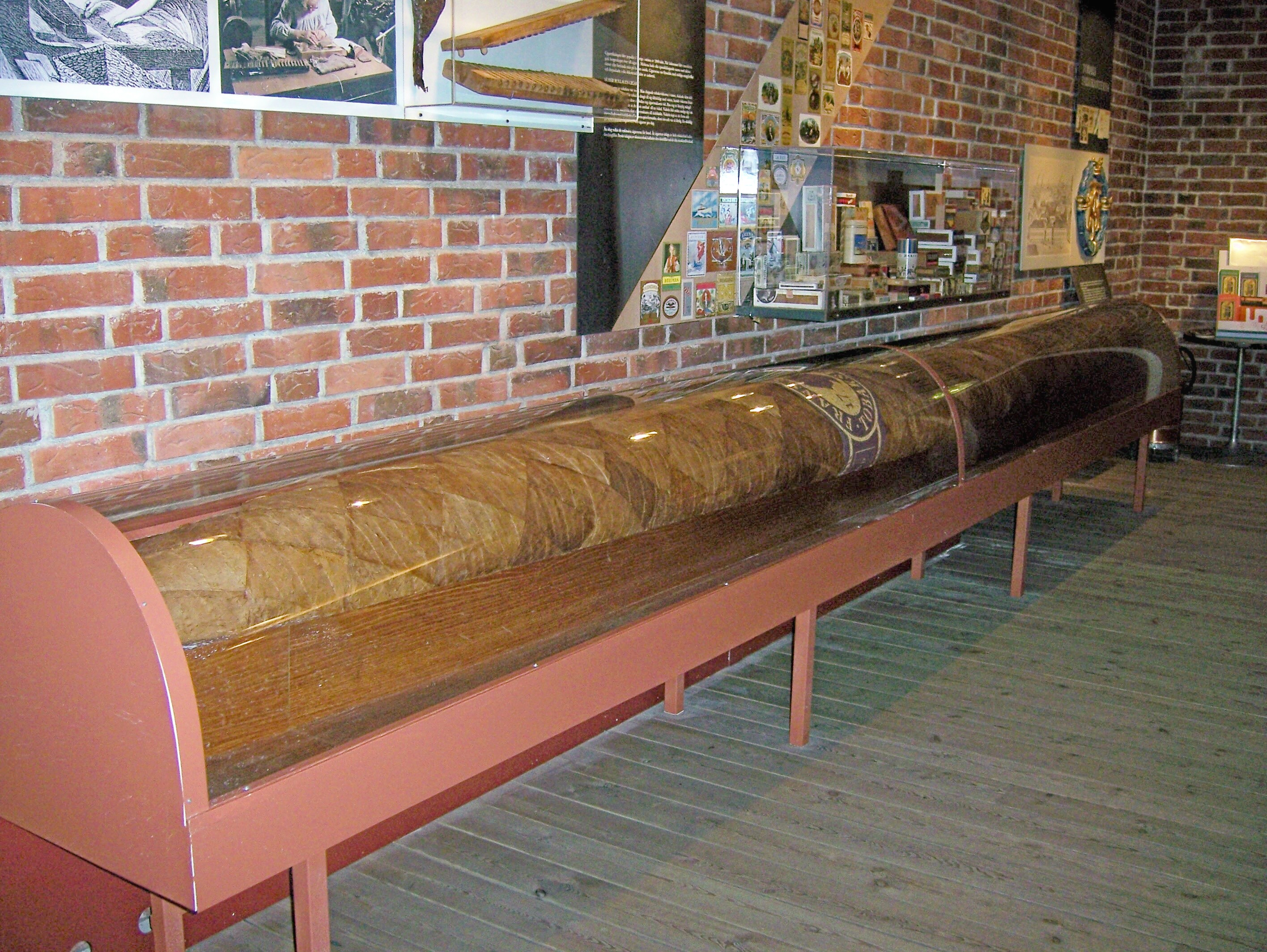
World's largest cigar at the Tobacco and Matchstick Museum

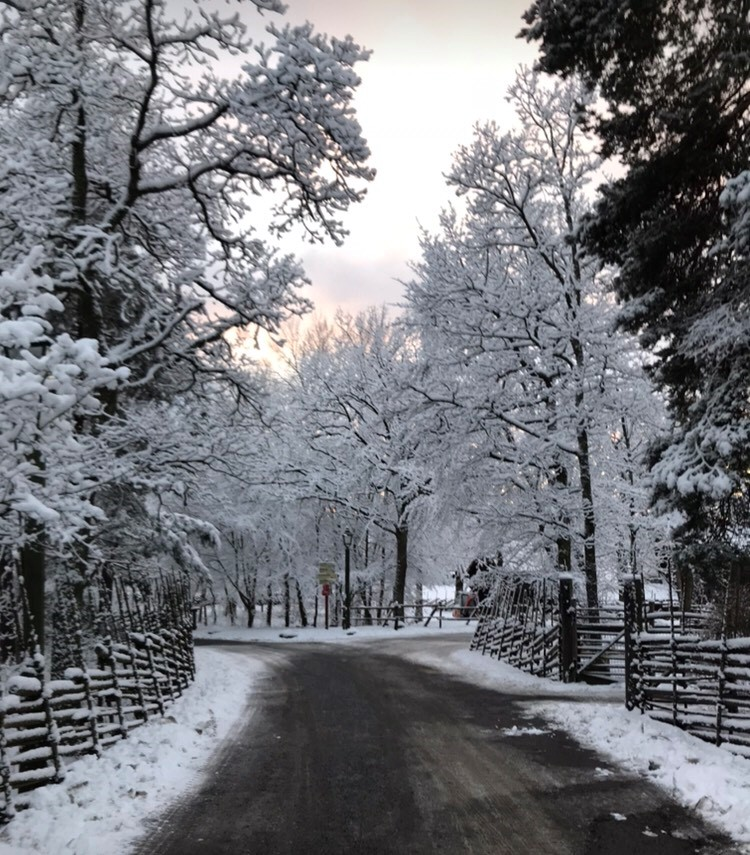
Skansen on a winter afternoon

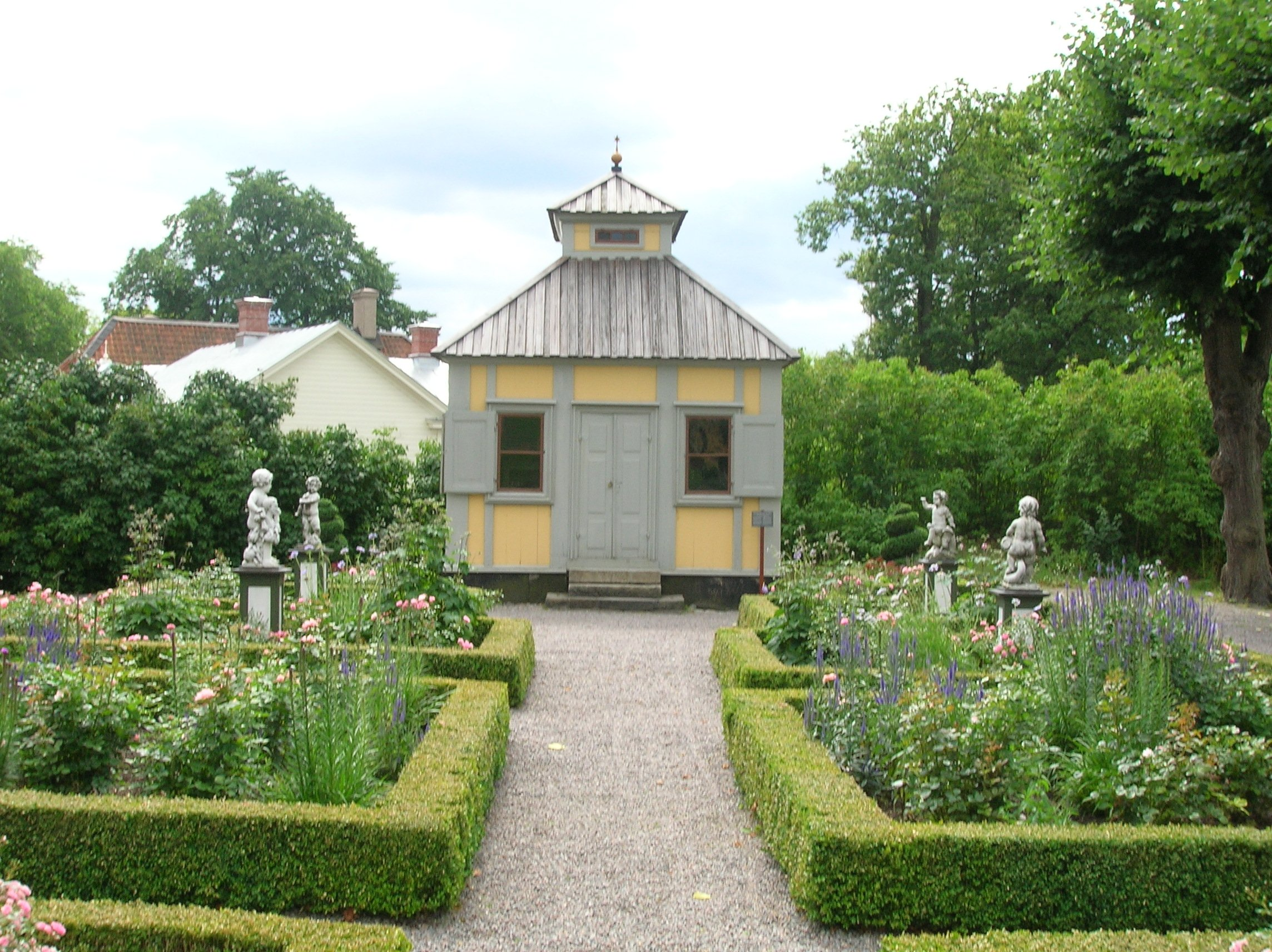
Summerhouse of Swedenborg

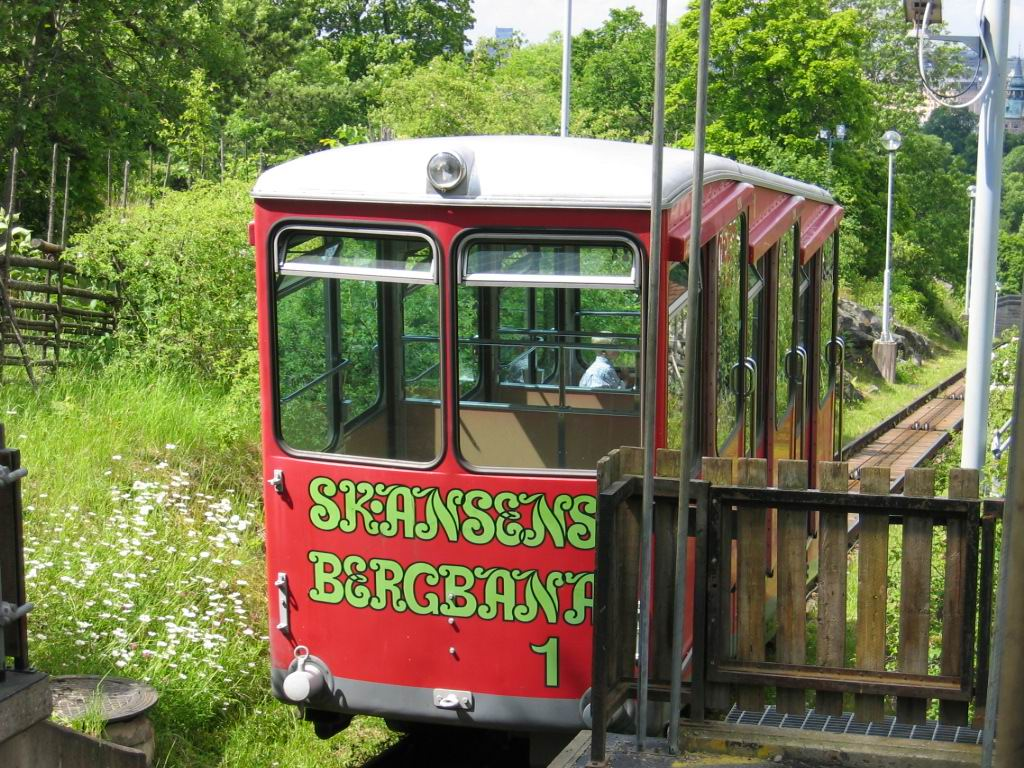
The funicular railway

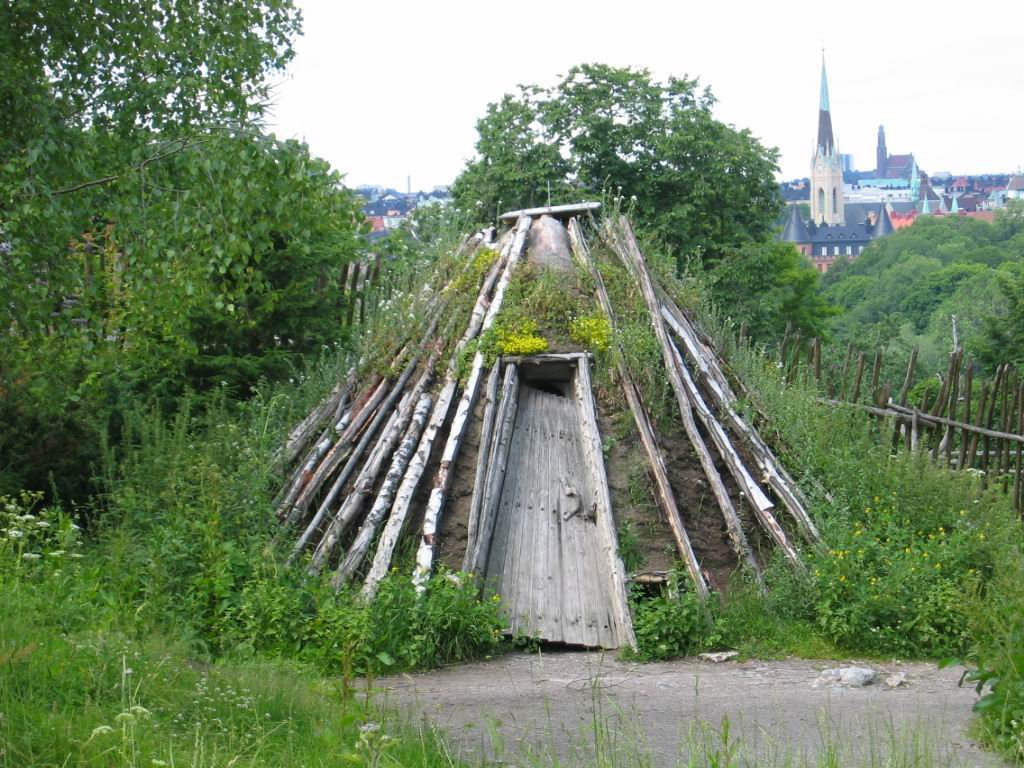
A Sami hut

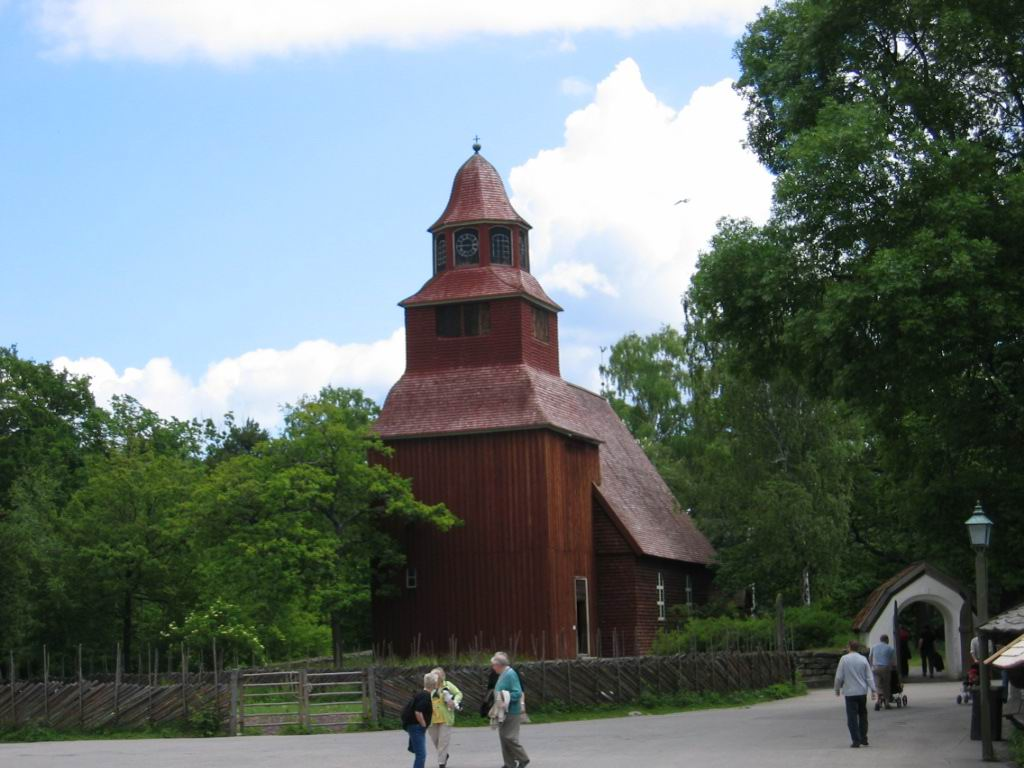
Seglora Church

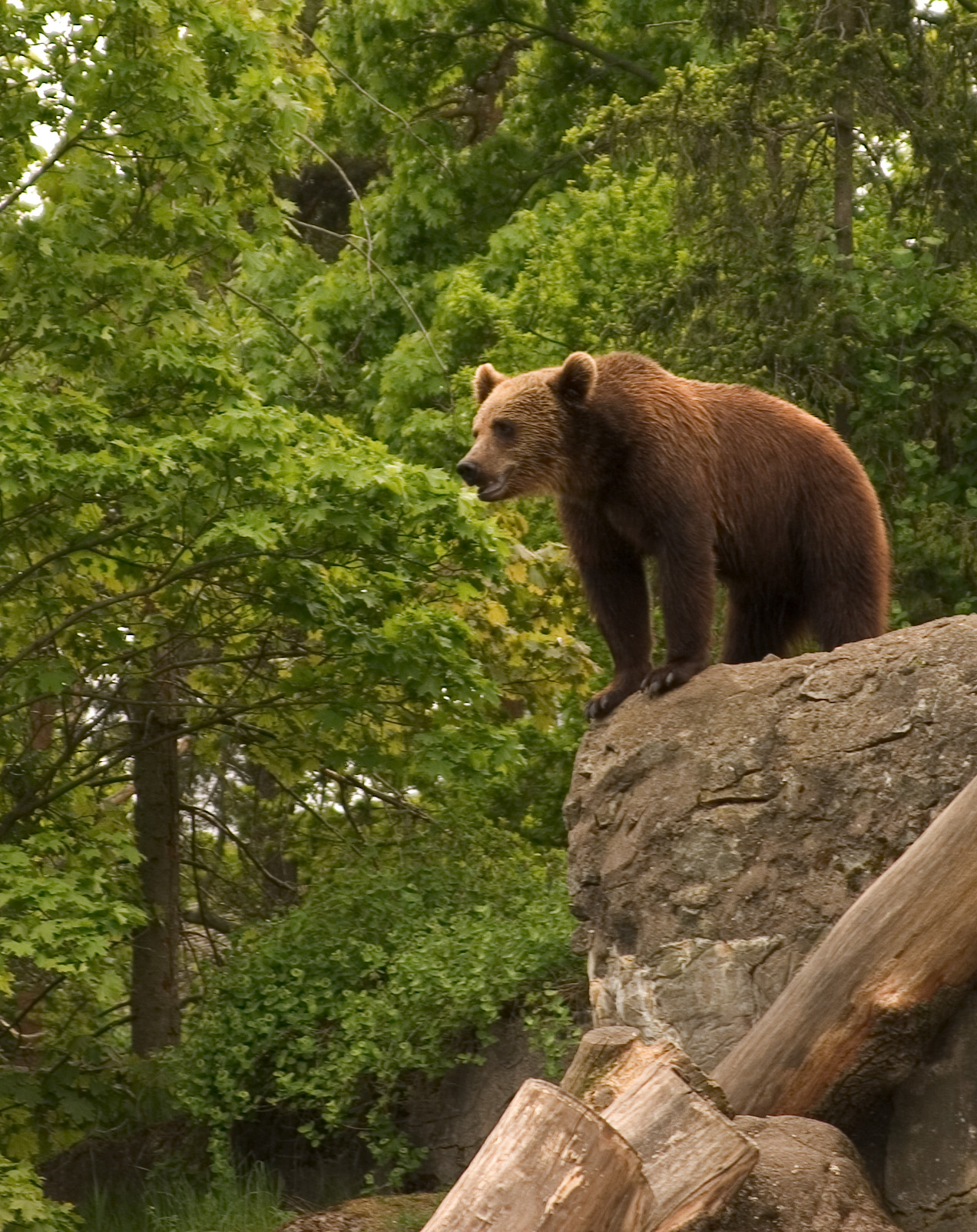
A brown bear at Skansen

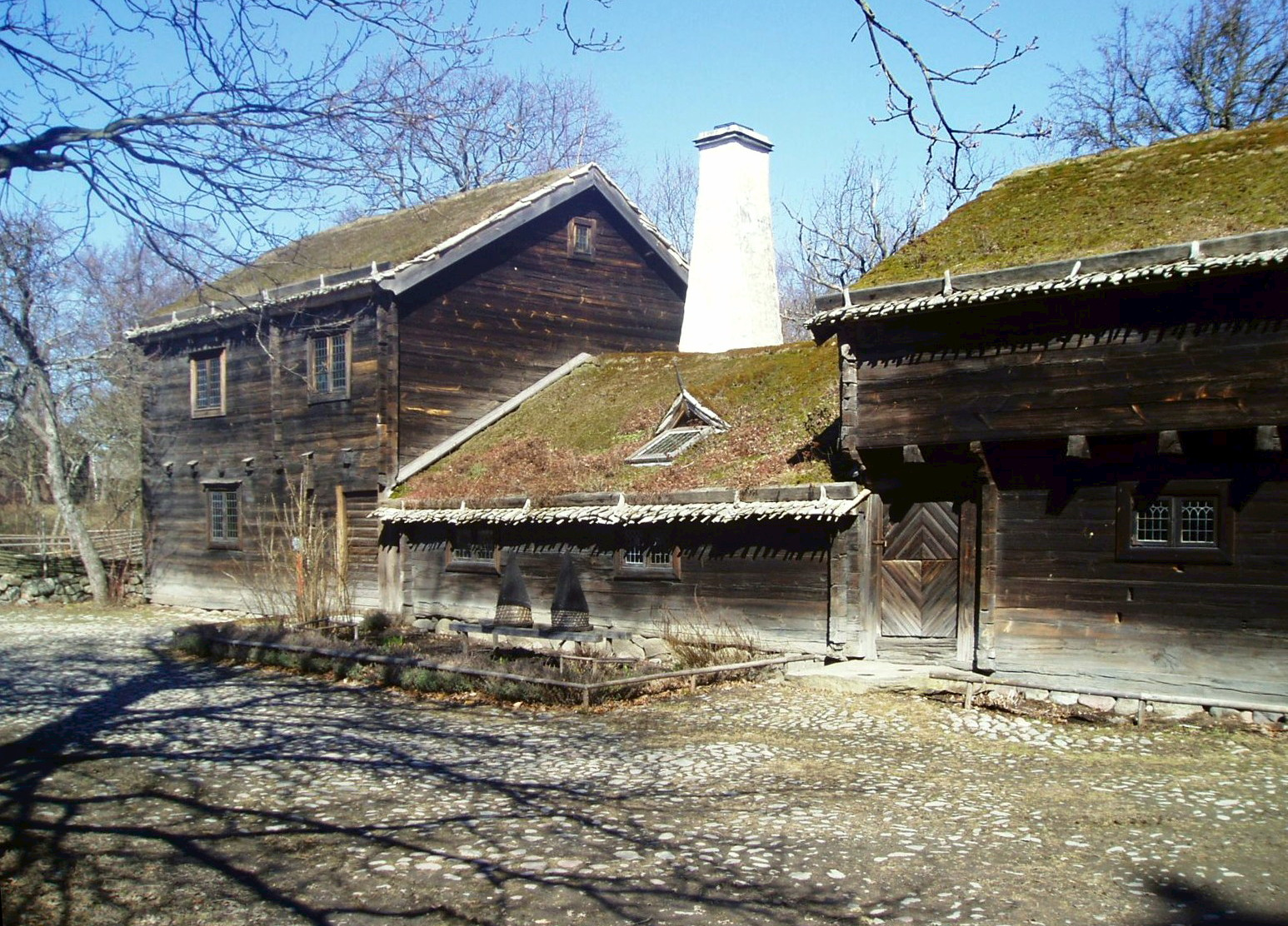
House from Blekinge County now at Skansen

A docent demonstrating spinning at Skansen

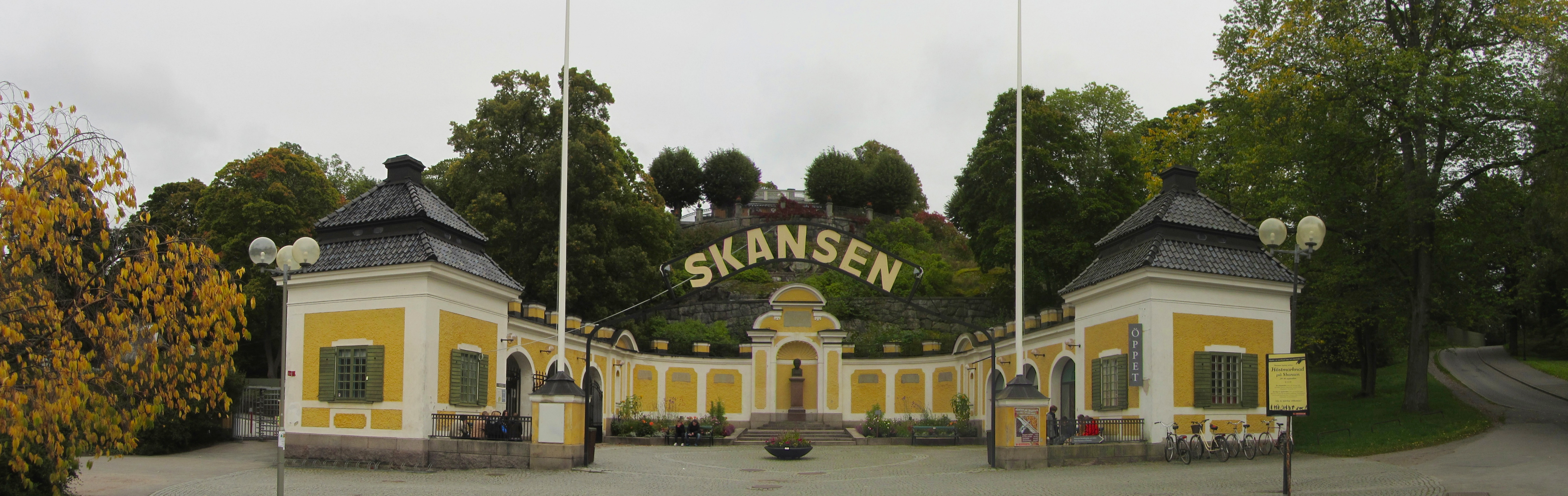
Entrance Building

== See also ==
- Culture in Stockholm
- Royal National City Park
- The Baltic Sea Science Center, located on the same site
- Västernorrland County Museum
