= Noel B. Salazar =

Socio-cultural anthropologist

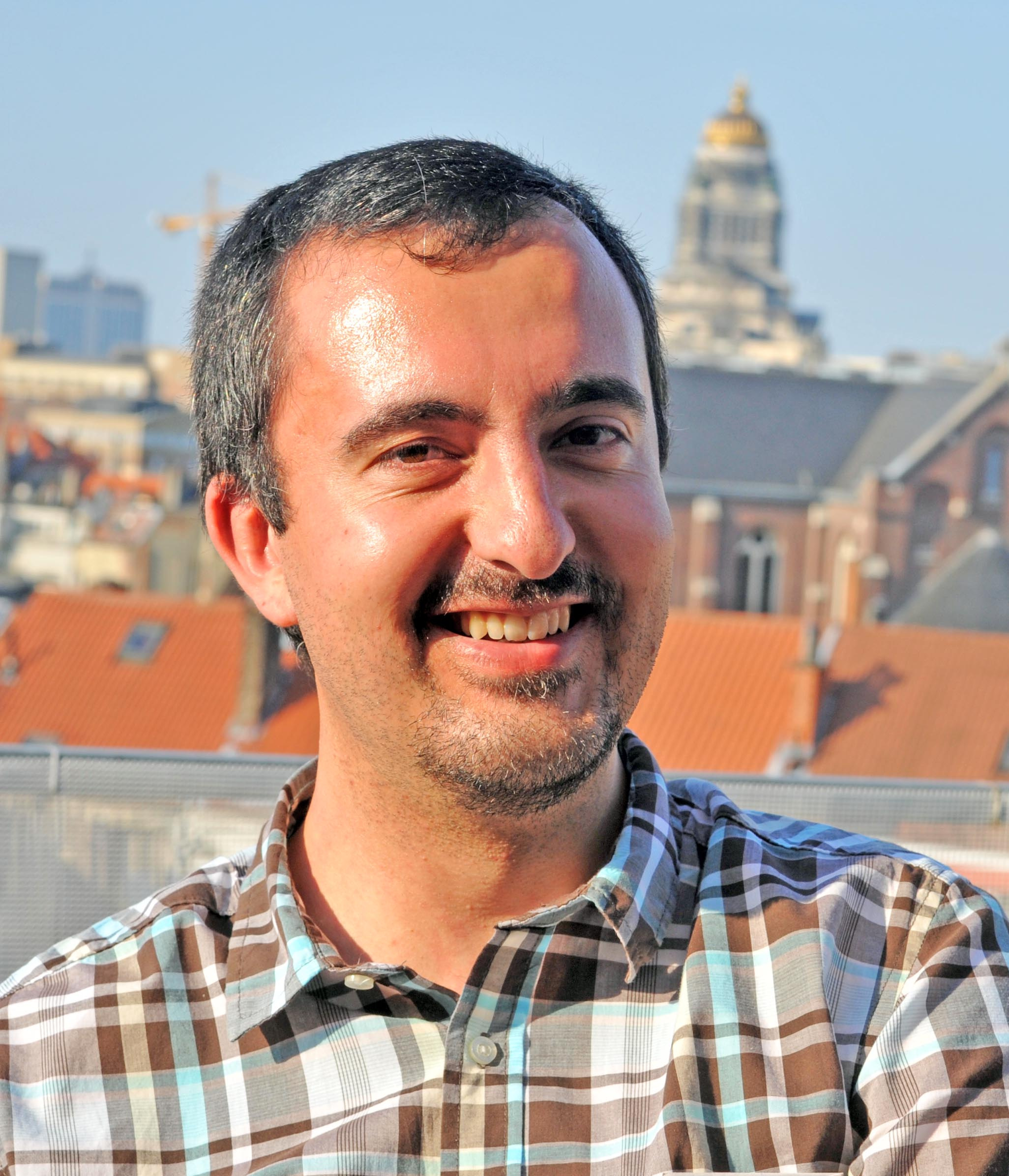
- Salazar in 2010
- Occupation: Anthropologist

Education
- Education: B.Sc., University of Leuven (1993); M.Sc., University of Essex (1998); Ph.D., University of Pennsylvania (2008)

Philosophical work
- Notable works: Momentous Mobilities (2018); Envisioning Eden (2010)
- Notable ideas: (im)mobility, tourism imaginaries, glocal ethnography

Noel B. Salazar is a sociocultural anthropologist known for his transdisciplinary work on mobility and travel, the local-to-global nexus, discourses and imaginaries of 'Otherness', heritage, cultural brokering, cosmopolitanism and endurance.

== Life ==
Noel B. Salazar was born in Dunkirk, France, of a Spanish father and a Belgian mother. He grew up in the historical Flemish town of Bruges, a celebrated cultural tourism destination. Salazar studied psychology, philosophy, and development studies at the University of Leuven (Belgium), neuropsychology at the University of Essex (UK), and anthropology and African studies at the University of Pennsylvania (United States). He is research professor in anthropology at the Faculty of Social Sciences, University of Leuven, where he founded CuMoRe (Cultural Mobilities Research).

== Theory ==
Noel B. Salazar's main research interests include anthropologies of (im)mobility and travel, heritage, the local-to-global nexus, discourses and imaginaries of alterity, cultural brokering, cosmopolitanism, and endurance. His anthropological work synthesizes ethnographic findings with conceptual frameworks developed within anthropology, sociology, geography, cultural studies, tourism studies, philosophy and psychology. Salazar has won numerous grants for his research projects (including from the National Science Foundation, the EU Seventh Framework Programme, and FWO).

While at the University of Pennsylvania, Salazar experienced first-hand the benefits of transdisciplinary research. His involvement within the Department of Anthropology's Public Interest Anthropology project taught him the necessity of bridging the divide between academia and the wider public. Together with archaeologist Benjamin W. Porter, now professor at the Near Eastern Studies Department, UC Berkeley, he applied the public interest perspective to heritage tourism. Understanding the changing meaning and value of (intangible) cultural heritage is still high on his research agenda. It forms part of Salazar's broader work within the subfield of the anthropology of tourism. He uses the findings from his intended ethnographic fieldwork to shift the predominant focus in tourism studies on tourist and impact studies to a study of tourism service providers, showing their crucial role as intermediaries. In his book, Envisioning Eden: Mobilizing Imaginaries in Tourism and Beyond (2010), he critically analyses the circulation and dynamics of tourism imaginaries, illustrated with ethnographic data from Yogyakarta (Indonesia) and Arusha (Tanzania).

One of Salazar's key concepts is the one of imaginaries, which he describes as "culturally shared and socially transmitted representational assemblages that are used as meaning-making devices (mediating how people act, cognize, and value the world)". He is currently using this concept to research the role of dominant discourses and images of (im)mobility in cultures across the globe. Salazar conceives mobility as a locally circulating socio-cultural construct that positively values the ability to move, the freedom of movement, and the tendency to change easily or quickly. Salazar tries to bridge the academic gap between tourism and migration studies by studying the analytical purchase of (im)mobility as an overarching concept. More concretely, his cultural mobilities research helps us to understand the complex (dis)connections between tourism imaginaries and ideas of transcultural migration. This work happens in close collaboration with established anthropologists such as Nina Glick Schiller (University of Manchester), Nelson H. H. Graburn (University of California, Berkeley) and Alan Smart (University of Calgary).

== Publications ==
=== Monographs ===
- 2018 Momentous Mobilities: Anthropological musings on the meanings of travel. Oxford: Berghahn.
- 2010 Envisioning Eden: Mobilizing imaginaries in tourism and beyond. Oxford: Berghahn.

=== Edited volumes ===
- 2022 Contemporary meanings of endurance: An interdisciplinary approach. London: Routledge. [with Jeroen Scheerder]
- 2020 Pacing mobilities: Timing, intensity, tempo and duration of human movements. Oxford: Berghahn. [with Vered Amit]
- 2017 Methodologies of mobility: Ethnography and experiment. Oxford: Berghahn. [with Alice Elliot & Roger Norum]
- 2017 Mega-event mobilities: A critical analysis. London: Routledge. [with Christiane Timmerman, Johan Wets, Luana Gama Gato & Sarah Van den Broucke]
- 2016 Keywords of mobility: Critical engagements. Oxford: Berghahn. [with Kiran Jayaram]
- 2014 Regimes of mobility: Imaginaries and relationalities of power. London: Routledge. [with Nina Glick Schiller]
- 2014 Tourism imaginaries: Anthropological approaches. Oxford: Berghahn. [with Nelson H. H. Graburn]

=== Special journal issues ===
- 2024 Navigating hurdles and reconfiguring (im)mobilities in times of corona. Theme issue of Critique of Anthropology 44(4). [with Chrysi Kyratsou]
- 2024 Navigating (im)mobility rules. Theme issue of Focaal 99. [with Ignacio Fradejas-García]
- 2023 Understanding neo-nomadic mobilities beyond self-actualisation. Theme issue of Mobility Humanities 2(2). [with Fabiola Mancinelli]
- 2021 Mobile labour. Theme issue of Mobilities 16(2). [with Cristiana Bastos and Andre Novoa]
- 2021 Modes de vie mobiles Theme issue of Anthropologie et Sociétés 44(2). [with Celia Forget]
- 2017 Key figures of mobility. Theme issue of Social Anthropology 25(1). [with Jamie Coates]
- 2013 Contemporary ethnographic practice and the value of serendipity. Theme issue of Social Anthropology 21(2). [with Isabelle Rivoal]
- 2013 Regimes of mobility. Theme issue of Journal of Ethnic and Migration Studies 39(2). [with Nina Glick-Schiller]
- 2011 Anthropological takes on (im)mobility. Theme issue of Identities: Global Studies in Culture and Power 18(6). [with Alan Smart]
- 2005 Resolving conflicts in heritage tourism: A public interest anthropology approach. Theme issue of International Journal of Heritage Studies 11(5). [with Benjamin W. Porter]
- 2004 Heritage and tourism, PIA and global interests. Theme issue of Anthropology in Action 11(2/3). [with Benjamin W. Porter]

=== Journal articles (selection) ===
- 2024 Heritage imaginaries and imaginaries of heritage: An analytical lens to rethink heritage from ‘alter-native’ ontologies. International Journal of Heritage Studies 30(2):181-194. [with Ana Elisa Astudillo]
- 2023 Mobile places and emplaced mobilities: Problematizing the place-mobility nexus. Mobilities 18(4):582-592.
- 2022 Immobility: The relational and experiential qualities of an ambiguous concept. Transfers: Interdisciplinary Journal of Mobility Studies 11(3):3-21.
- 2022 Anthropologies of the present and the presence of anthropology. Etnografia 2(16):6-24.
- 2022 The paradox of mobility technology usage: How GPS sports watches keep “active lifestylers” (im)mobile. Mobility Humanities 1(1):62-75.
- 2021 Post-national belongings, cosmopolitan becomings and mediating mobilities. Journal of Sociology 57(1):165-176.
- 2021 Existential vs. essential mobilities: Insights from before, during and after a crisis. Mobilities 16(1):20-23.
- 2020 On imagination and imaginaries, mobility and immobility: Seeing the forest for the trees. Culture & Psychology 26(4):768-777.
- 2018 Theorizing mobility through concepts and figures. Tempo Social 30(2):153-168.
- 2017 Anthropologies of tourism: What’s in a name? American Anthropologist 119(4):723-747.
- 2017 The free movement of people around the world would be utopian. Identities: Global Studies in Culture and Power 24(2):123-155. [with Simone Abram, Bela Feldman-Bianco, Shahram Khosravi and Nicholas de Genova]
- 2014 To be or not to be a tourist: The role of concept-metaphors in tourism studies. Tourism Recreation Research 39(2):259-265.
- 2013 Imagineering otherness: Anthropological legacies in contemporary tourism. Anthropological Quarterly 86(3):669-696.
- 2013 Regimes of mobility across the globe. Journal of Ethnic and Migration Studies 39(2):183-200. [with Nina Glick-Schiller]
- 2013 Contemporary ethnographic practice and the value of serendipity. Social Anthropology 21(2):178-185. [with Isabelle Rivoal]
- 2013 Seasonal lifestyle tourism: The case of Chinese elites. Annals of Tourism Research 43(4):81-99. [with Yang Zhang]
- 2013 Imagining mobility at the 'end of the world'. History and Anthropology 24(2):233-252.
- 2012 Tourism imaginaries: A conceptual approach. Annals of Tourism Research 39(2):863-882.
- 2012 Community-based cultural tourism: Issues, threats and opportunities. Journal of Sustainable Tourism 20(1):9-22.
- 2011 The power of imagination in transnational mobilities. Identities: Global Studies in Power and Culture 18(6):576-598.
- 2011 Anthropological takes on (im)mobility. Identities: Global Studies in Power and Culture 18(6):i-ix. [with Alan Smart]
- 2010 Tourism and cosmopolitanism: A view from below. International Journal of Tourism Anthropology 1(1):55-69.
- 2010 Towards an anthropology of cultural mobilities. Crossings: Journal of Migration and Culture, 1(1):53-68.
- 2009 Imaged or imagined? Cultural representations and the "tourismification" of peoples and places. Cahiers d'Études Africaines 193-194:49-71.
- 2009 A troubled past, a challenging present, and a promising future: Tanzania’s tourism development in perspective. Tourism Review International 12(3-4):259-273.
- 2008 Enough stories! Asian tourism redefining the roles of Asian tour guides. Civilisations 57(1/2):207-222.
- 2007 Towards a global culture of heritage interpretation? Evidence from Indonesia and Tanzania. Tourism Recreation Research 32(3):23-30.
- 2006 Touristifying Tanzania: Local guides, global discourse. Annals of Tourism Research 33(3): 833–852.
- 2006 Antropología del turismo en países en desarrollo: Análisis crítico de las culturas, poderes e identidades generados por el turismo. Tabula Rasa: Revista de Humanidades 5:99-128. [The anthropology of tourism in developing countries: A critical analysis of tourism cultures, powers, and identities]
- 2006 Building a ‘culture of peace’ through tourism: Reflexive and analytical notes and queries. Universitas Humanística 62(2):319-333.
- 2005 Tourism and glocalization: ‘Local’ tour guiding. Annals of Tourism Research 32(3):628-646.
- 2005 Heritage tourism, conflict, and the public interest: An introduction. International Journal of Heritage Studies 11(5):361-370. [with Benjamin W. Porter]

== Service ==
Noel B. Salazar serves on the editorial boards of, among others, Journal of Sustainable Tourism, Transfers, and Applied Mobilities. He is editor of the Worlds in Motion Book Series (Berghahn). From 2011 until 2015, he served on the Executive Committee of the European Association of Social Anthropologists. In 2013, Salazar was elected as President of the association. Within EASA, he founded the Anthropology and Mobility Network (AnthroMob). In 2018, he was elected as Secretary-General of the International Union of Anthropological and Ethnological Sciences for a five-year period, after having served a five-year term as Vice-President of the organization. Between 2013 and 2018, he was also a member of the Young Academy of Belgium.

Salazar is a founding member of the American Anthropological Association Anthropology of Tourism Interest Group, now Council on Heritage and the Anthropology of Tourism (CHAT). From 2012 until 2018, he was chair of the Commission on the Anthropology of Tourism of the International Union of Anthropological and Ethnological Sciences, and took up that position again in 2024. He is an expert member of the ICOMOS International Cultural Tourism Committee and the UNESCO-UNITWIN Network 'Culture, Tourism and Development'.
