= European Association of Social Anthropologists =

Organization of scholars

- Abbreviation: EASA
- Formation: 1989
- Region served: Europe
- Members: 1,500+
- President: Hayal Akarsu (2025–2026)
- Website: easaonline.org

The European Association of Social Anthropologists (EASA) is an organization of scholars in the field of anthropology founded in 1989. EASA serves as a major professional organization for social anthropologists working in Europe. It is supported by the Wenner-Gren Foundation for Anthropological Research.

== History ==
The European Association of Social Anthropologists (EASA) was formally established in 1989, following a meeting in Rome where 22 participants from 13 European countries and the United States discussed the need for a continent-wide association. Among its founding members were the anthropologists Philippe Descola and Adam Kuper. The decision was motivated by the intellectual fragmentation of European anthropology and the lack of a shared forum for exchange. The first EASA conference took place in Coimbra, Portugal, in 1990, bringing together around 450 anthropologists from across Europe as well as invited colleagues from the Pan-African Association of Anthropologists. The event highlighted both differences and synergies between national traditions of anthropology, confirming the need for such a network.

== Purpose, activities, and publications ==
EASA provides a forum for anthropologists working in Europe and beyond to collaborate, share research, and strengthen the discipline. Its stated aim is to promote anthropology in Europe by facilitating communication among anthropologists and representing their interests internationally. The association organizes biennial conferences, supports thematic networks, publishes academic journals, and provides resources for early-career scholars.

EASA’s flagship journal is Social Anthropology/Anthropologie Social (SA/AS), a quarterly peer-reviewed journal that publishes theoretical, methodological, and ethnographic research in social anthropology. The journal is owned by EASA and it is the principal venue for debates within European anthropology and is distributed to all members of the association.

Since 1992, EASA has supported a dedicated book series showcasing the innovative research of its members. Since 2003, this series—featuring both monographs and edited volumes—has been published in collaboration with Berghahn Books, highlighting social and political themes through diverse theoretical and empirical lenses. The current editorial team—Monika Palmberger, Magdalena Suerbaum, and Elisa Lanari—actively encourages proposals from both emerging and established scholars, across varied geographical and disciplinary perspectives.

== Networks and membership ==
The association hosts thematic networks that bring together scholars around shared research interests, from medical anthropology and migration studies to heritage and material culture. Membership is open to professional anthropologists, postgraduate students, and institutions engaged in teaching and research in anthropology.

== Presidents ==
The following list details the people who have held the position of President of EASA chronologically:

- 2025-2026: Hayal Akarsu
- 2023-2024: Ana Ivasiuc
- 2021-2022: Mariya Ivancheva
- 2019-2020: Sarah Green
- 2017-2018: Valeria Siniscalchi
- 2015-2016: Thomas Hylland Eriksen
- 2013-2015: Noel B. Salazar
- 2011-2012: Susana Narotzky
- 2009-2010: Michal Buchowski
- 2007-2008: Shalini Randeria
- 2005-2006: Dorle Dracklé
- 2003-2004: João de Pina-Cabral
- 2001-2002: Jon P. Mitchell
- 1999-2000: Gerd Baumann
- 1997-1998: Marilyn Strathern
- 1995-1996: Ulf Hannerz
- 1993-1994: John Davis
- 1991-1992: Kirsten Hastrup
- 1989-1990: Adam Kuper

== Conferences ==
Since the inaugural Coimbra conference, EASA has organized biennial meetings hosted by universities in different European countries. These conferences are central to EASA’s mission, providing space for plenaries, thematic workshops, and informal networking across linguistic and national boundaries. Discussions at early conferences dealt with epistemological differences between British, French, Scandinavian, and other anthropological traditions, as well as broader issues such as gender representation and language use within the association.

- 1990, 1st EASA Conference: University of Coimbra, Portugal
- 1992, 2nd EASA Conference: University of Prague, Czech Republic
- 1994, 3rd EASA Conference: University of Oslo, Norway
- 1996, 4th EASA Conference: Catalan Institute of Anthropology (ICA), Barcelona, Spain
- 1998, 5th EASA Conference: Frobenius-Institute, Frankfurt, Germany
- 2000, 6th EASA Conference: Jagiellonian University, Kraków, Poland
- 2002, 7th EASA Conference: University of Copenhagen, Denmark
- 2004, 8th EASA Conference: University of Vienna, Austria
- 2006, 9th EASA Conference: University of Bristol, UK
- 2008, 10th EASA Conference: University of Ljubljana, Slovenia
- 2010, 11th EASA Conference: National University of Ireland, Maynooth, Ireland
- 2012, 12th EASA Conference: Paris West University Nanterre La Défense, France
- 2014, 13th EASA Conference: Tallinn University, Estonia
- 2016, 14th EASA Conference: University of Milano-Bicocca, Italy
- 2018, 15th EASA Conference: Stockholm University, Sweden
- 2020, 16th EASA Conference: University of Lisbon, Portugal (hybrid/online)
- 2022, 17th EASA Conference: Queen’s University Belfast, Northern Ireland
- 2024, 18th EASA Conference: University of Barcelona, Spain

The 19th conference is scheduled for Poznań, Poland, 21–24 July 2026, hosted at Adam Mickiewicz University.
