= Olle Björklund =

Swedish actor and television host (1916-1981)

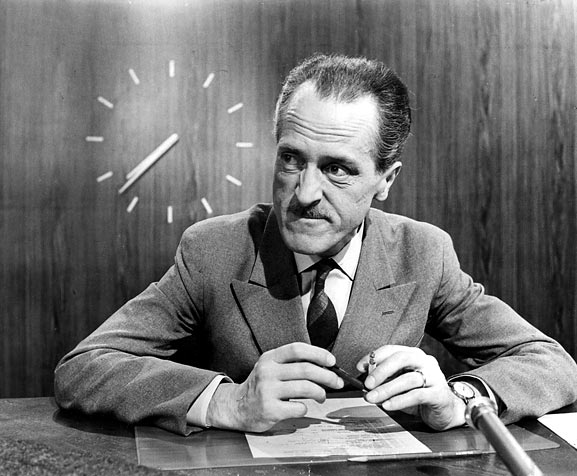
- Olle Björklund in Aktuellt (1960)
- Born: Sven Olof Björklund; 26 June 1916; Botkyrka, Sweden
- Died: 27 March 1981 (aged 64); Örkelljunga, Sweden
- Other name: Mr. Aktuellt
- Education: Royal Dramatic Training Academy (1936)
- Occupation: Television journalist
- Years active: 1935–1981
- Notable credit(s): Aktuellt; Co-anchor (1958–1961)
- Spouse: Ylva Dahlström (–1969) (divorce)

Sven Olof Björklund (28 June 1916 – 27 March 1981), better known as Olle Björklund, was a Swedish actor and television host. Björklund was the first Swedish television news presenter, hosting the national news show Aktuellt from 1958. In that capacity, he quickly earned his popular nickname Mr. Aktuellt. However, in 1961, Björklund's career came to an end as he was fired from his position at Swedish Television in the midst of a controversy involving a tobacco advertisement.

== Biography ==
Björklund graduated from the Gothenburg High School of Latin in 1933. He went on to study at the Lorensbergsteatern Theater Acting School (1933–1934), The Reima School (1934–1935), and later the Royal Dramatic Training Academy in 1936. In 1937, Björklund was engaged at the Svensk Filmindustri motion picture studios, and in the following year at the Vasateatern Theater in Stockholm. In 1958, he was employed at Swedish Television; hosting the very first national news program, Aktuellt, where he soon became a national celebrity. Aktuellt was first aired on 2 September 1958; this particular transmission become notorious, as almost everything went wrong. However, Björklund did his best - with forced patience - to keep his composure.

At the height of his career in 1961, during his summer leave, Björklund toured local events at public parks on the Swedish West Coast. His appearance was in part sponsored by a local beer and tobacco wholesaler. Although Björklund had been promised that his name would not appear in any advertising, the deal was not honored by the sponsor. The national TV executive Nils Erik Bæhrendtz, who had publicly criticized Björklund for his park tour, personally ordered Björklund's swift resignation from Swedish Television. After his forced resignation, and despite many viewers demanding his immediate return to the evening news show, Björklund virtually disappeared from the public scene. Four years later, on 20 October 1964, Björklund briefly returned to television; when he appeared as a guest in a TV show, reading a short poem by Swedish author Harry Martinson.

Björklund was married to Ylva Dahlström. They were divorced in 1969. Björklund died in Örkelljunga in 1981.

== Selected filmography ==
- John Ericsson, Victor of Hampton Roads (1937)
- Dollar (1938)
- Art for Art's Sake (1938)
- One Fiancée at a Time (1952)
- The Lady in White (1962)
