= Hannah Widell =

Swedish television presenter, media-personality and beauty entrepreneur

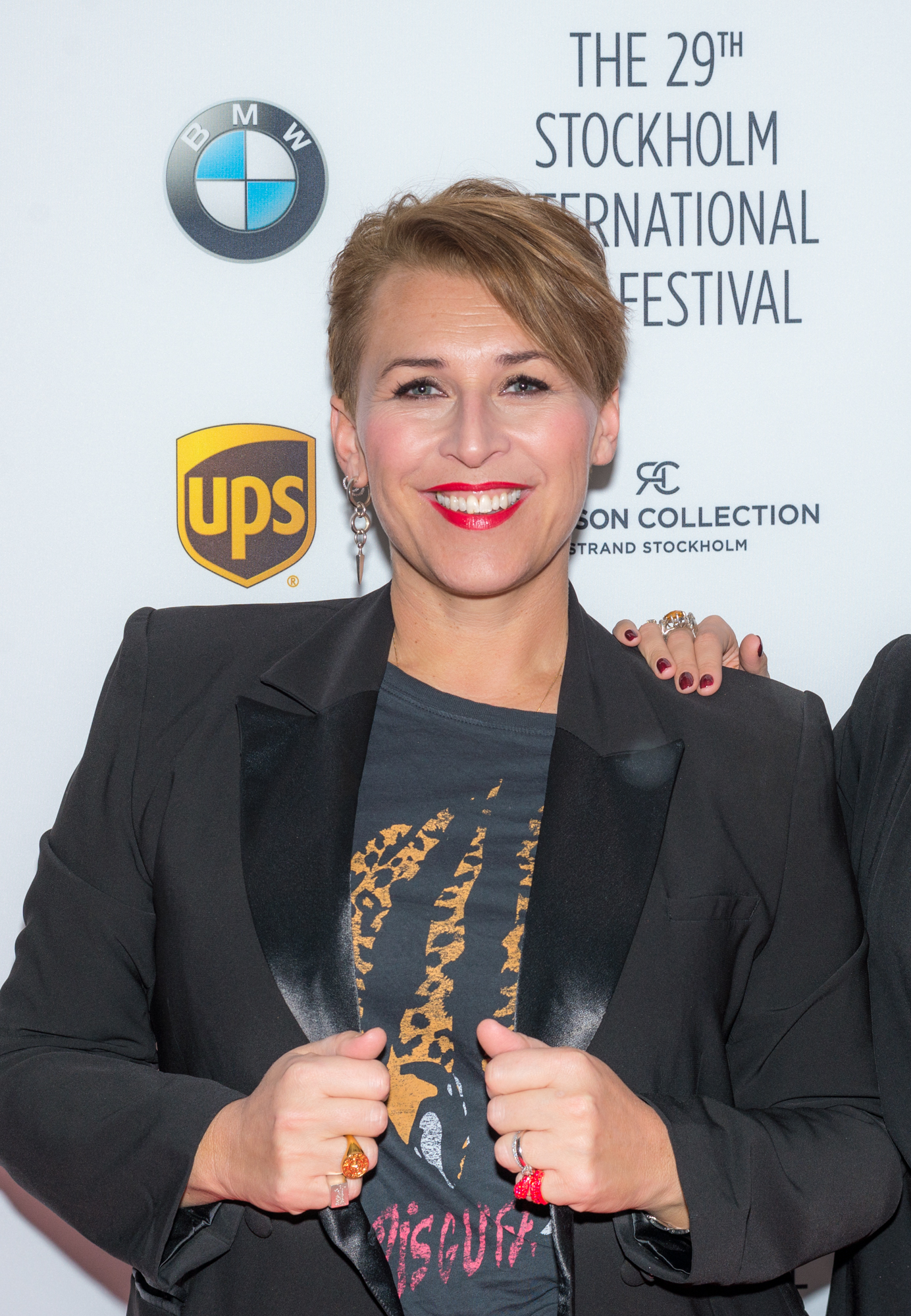
Hanna Widell in 2018

Hannah-Li Matilda Sunnanäng Widell (born 7 March 1975), known as Rosander during marriage, is a Swedish television presenter, media-personality and former beauty entrepreneur. Widell was the presenter of Kanal 5's reality series Big Brother in 2006. She has previously worked for TV4 and TV3. On TV3 she had the short-lived talk show Hannah, a Swedish version of Ricki Lake, and she also presented the reality series Harem along with Gry Forssell.

In 2016, Hannah Widell and her sister Amanda Schulman invested heavily in a failed beauty store concept resulting in a subsequent lawsuit from the liquidator to return 5mSEK in funds.

Widell has also been publicly criticised for selling pills with unsubstantiated health claims to followers of her pod sparking reactions from buyers, fellow influencers and others.

Widell was the one that discovered and brought the Så mycket bättre concept to Sweden. Along with her sister Amanda Schulman she runs the production company Perfect Day since 2011.

At the newspaper Aftonbladets website the two sisters runs the lifestyle project C/O Hannah och Amanda, which included blogs and the web-TV show Middag med Hannah & Amanda. In 2012 the concept was expanded with the magazine C/O Hannah & Amanda which is released once a month. Together they also have the podcast Fredagspodden med Hannah och Amanda.
