= Nils Erik Bæhrendtz =

Radio and television personality (1916–2002)

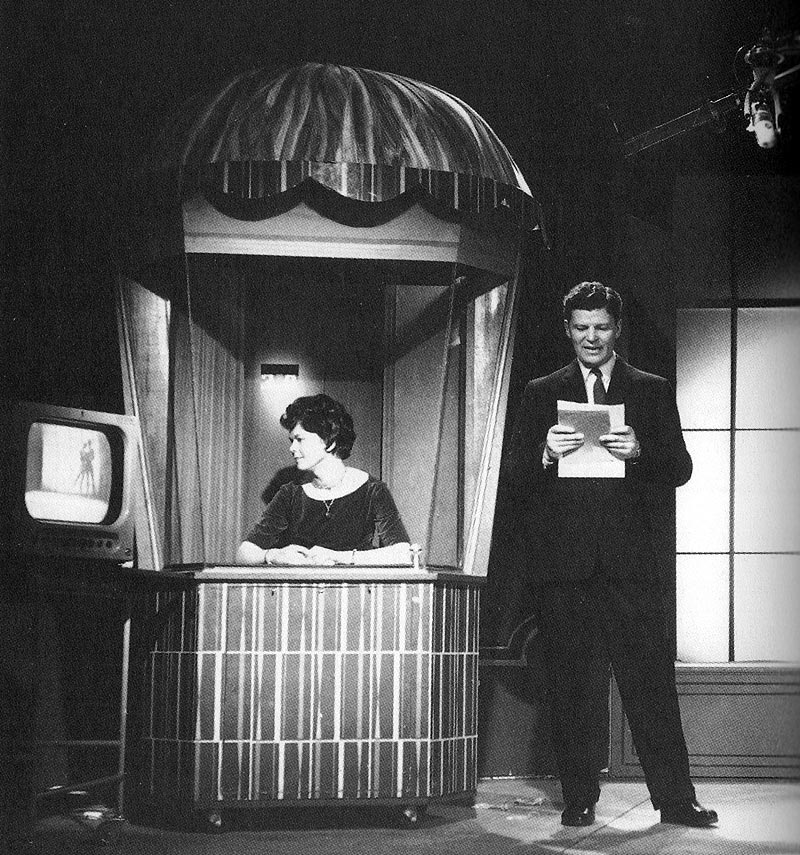
- Born: 20 November 1916; Stockholm, Sweden
- Died: 14 February 2002 (aged 85); Saltsjö-Boo, Sweden
- Education: Stockholm University, PhD (1952)
- Occupation: Television journalist
- Years active: 1951–1982
- Notable credit(s): Kvitt eller dubbelt presenter (1957–1973)
- Spouse: Maj-Britt Gabriella Pohlmer (his death)

Nils Erik Bæhrendtz (20 November 1916 – 14 February 2002) was a Swedish literary historian, and radio and television personality. Bæhrendtz played an important role in creating Sweden's first television news show Aktuellt, and in bringing new television show formats to Sweden. He was head of Swedish Radio and Swedish Television during the 1960s. After his sudden resignation as powerful manager, he was the executive president of the Skansen open-air museum foundation in Stockholm during the 1970s.

== Early life ==
Nils Erik Bæhrendtz was born in 1916 in Stockholm. He was the son of chancery secretary Erik and his wife Ida, born Jacobsson. Bæhrendtz studied Latin in high school, and literary history at Stockholm University. Awarded a PhD in 1952 for a thesis on the Norwegian realistic writer Alexander Kielland, Bæhrendtz became an associate professor of literature in Stockholm later that year.

== Media career ==
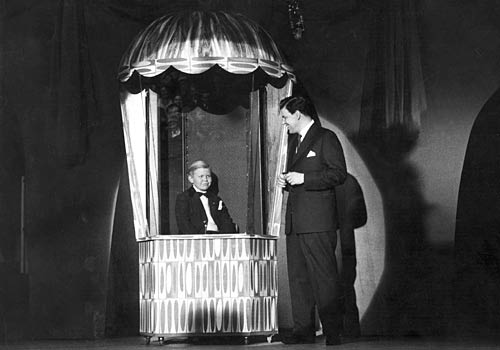
Nils Erik Bæhrendtz and 14-year-old Ulf Hannerz in Kvitt eller dubbelt, 12 January 1957).

In 1951 Bæhrendtz joined the Swedish Radio, becoming its program production manager the following year. He later moved on to Swedish Television, at the time a department of the Swedish Radio. As the manager of the news desk, he successfully introduced the news show Aktuellt in 1957. Although the first transmission was deemed a virtual disaster, Aktuellt soon became an important part of news media in Sweden. Bæhrendtz also participated in the introduction a number of popular television shows in Sweden. He is probably best known for presenting the television show Kvitt eller dubbelt – 10.000 kronorsfrågan (Double or nothing – The 10,000 kronor question).

Kvitt eller dubbelt was based on the American television show The $64,000 Question and is regarded as the definite breakthrough for a popular television program in Sweden. The first Kvitt eller dubbelt episode was aired on 12 January 1957. In that episode, 14-year-old Ulf Hannerz, presented by his nickname Hajen (The Shark), competed in the subject "tropical aquarium fish". Hannerz succeeded in winning 10,000 Kronor due to a judgment error in the program. The judge asked him which of the seven displayed fish had eyelids. He answered "hundfisk¨" (mudminnow). No, the judge said, it's "slamkrypare" (mudskipper); he wanted to dismiss Ulf from the game show. However, Ulf was indeed correct and the name slamkrypare entered the Swedish language as a term for a cocksure, but incorrect, assertion.

Bæhrendtz's success in introducing news television and entertainment show formats resulted in him becoming program director and manager of Swedish Television in 1959. This position made him quite powerful, and he did not hesitate to fire one of Sweden's most popular television presenters, Olle Björklund, after his name appeared in a tobacco advertisement in 1961. When Swedish Television introduced íts second national television channel, SVT2, Bæhrendtz was a strong supporter of a system based on one television channel financed by commercials along the original license-paid channel. However, he never gained any support by the Swedish social-democratic government to introduce commercials in Swedish television, and this is believed to be the main reason for his unexpected resignation from being television executive in 1968.

== Skansen and later life ==
After his resignation from television, Bæhrendtz became executive president of the Skansen foundation in 1969, a post he served for 13 years, until 1982. In 1969 the Skansen open-air museum was in deep financial difficulties, but Bæhrendtz's close connection to the government made sure that state funds to the museum park increased substantially. He also brought life into founder Arthur Hazelius's original spirit, made sure craftsmanship flourished, re-established the Solliden scene as an important entertainment stage, and raised the number of visitors to the museum park by more than 600,000 per year.

As the executive president of Skansen, Bæhrendtz effectively remained a public figure in Sweden. On 22 September 1973, he made a brief comeback in television, hosting another season of Kvitt eller dubbelt, one of the most popular television shows in Swedish history. Nils Erik Bæhrendtz married to Maj-Britt Gabriella Pohlmer. He died in 2002 in Saltsjö-Boo, east of Stockholm.

== Maj-Britt Bæhrendtz ==
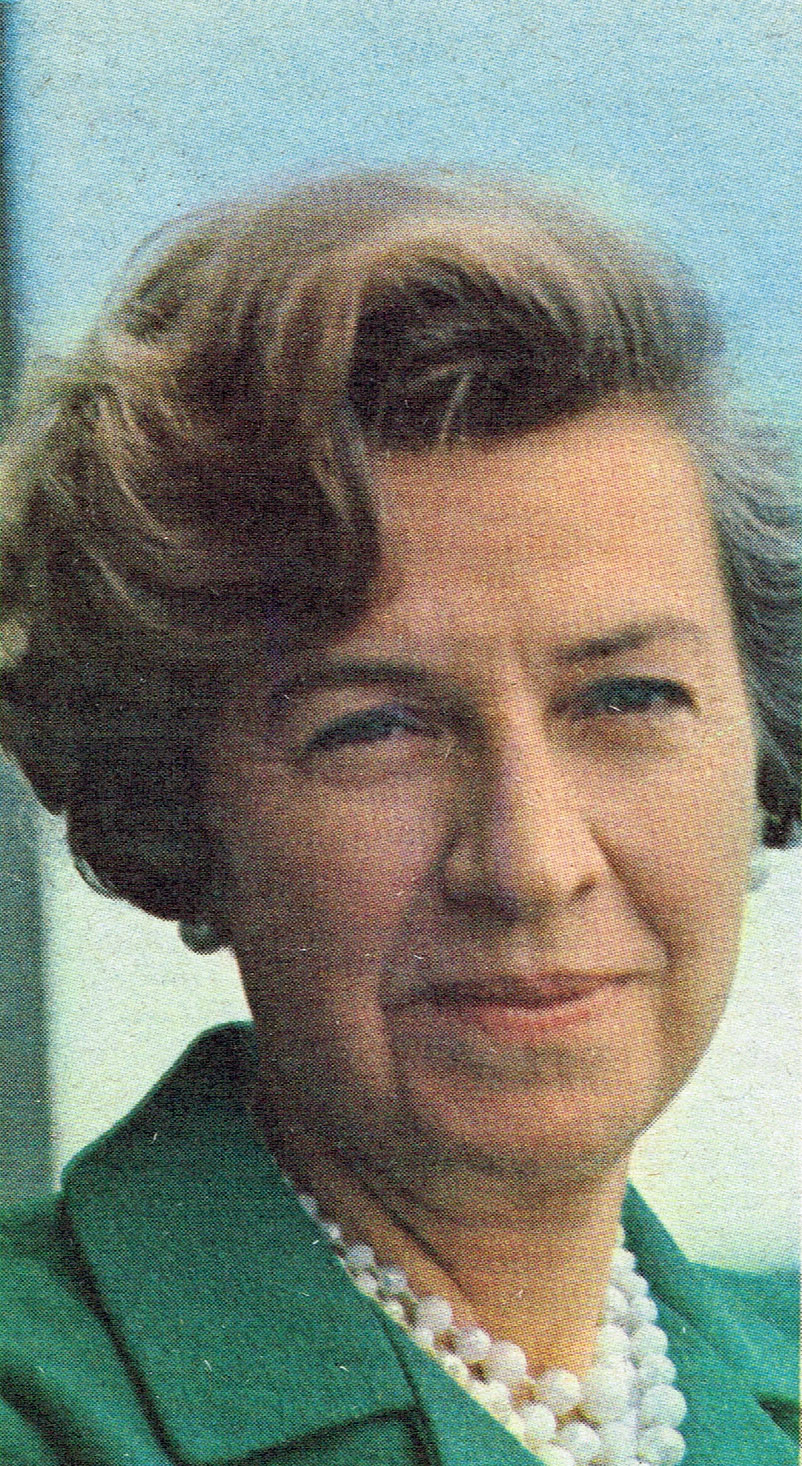
Maj-Britt Gabriella Bæhrendtz, was a Swedish writer and radio host.

Maj-Britt Gabriella Bæhrendtz (née Pohlmer; 23 May 1916 – 15 July 2018) was a Swedish writer and radio host, who married Nils in 1943.

Maj-Britt Gabriella Pohlmer was born in Strängnäs in May 1916. She was one of the hosts of the radio program Sommar i P1. She died in July 2018 at the age of 102.

Selected works:

- 1959: Döden en dröm
- 1968: Rör på dig, ät rätt, må bra
- 1970: Tio år med TV
